= Darou =

Darou refers to:

== Senegal ==
- Darou Hidjiratou
- Darou Kourarou
- Darou Minam (arrondissement)
- Darou Mousti Arrondissement

== Iran ==
- Darou Pakhsh
- Behestan Darou
- Cobel Darou

== See also ==
- Dahu, known as "daru" in Picardy
