= Arrondissements of Senegal =

Administrative territorial entity of Senegal

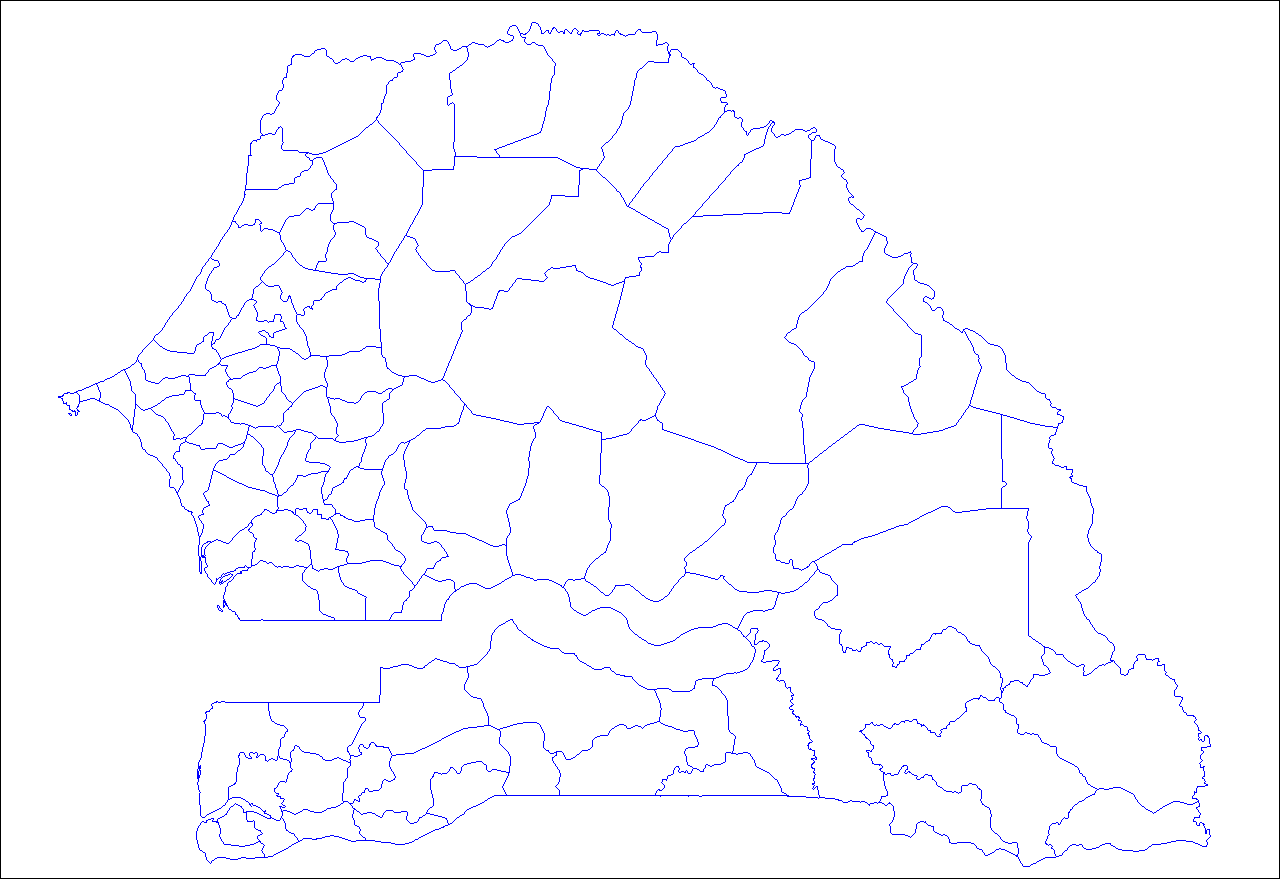
Arrondissements of Senegal

The departments of Senegal are subdivided into arrondissements. As of 2008 there were 123. The arrondissements are listed below, by department:

== Bakel ==
- Bélé Arrondissement
- Kéniaba Arrondissement
- Moudéry Arrondissement

== Bambey ==
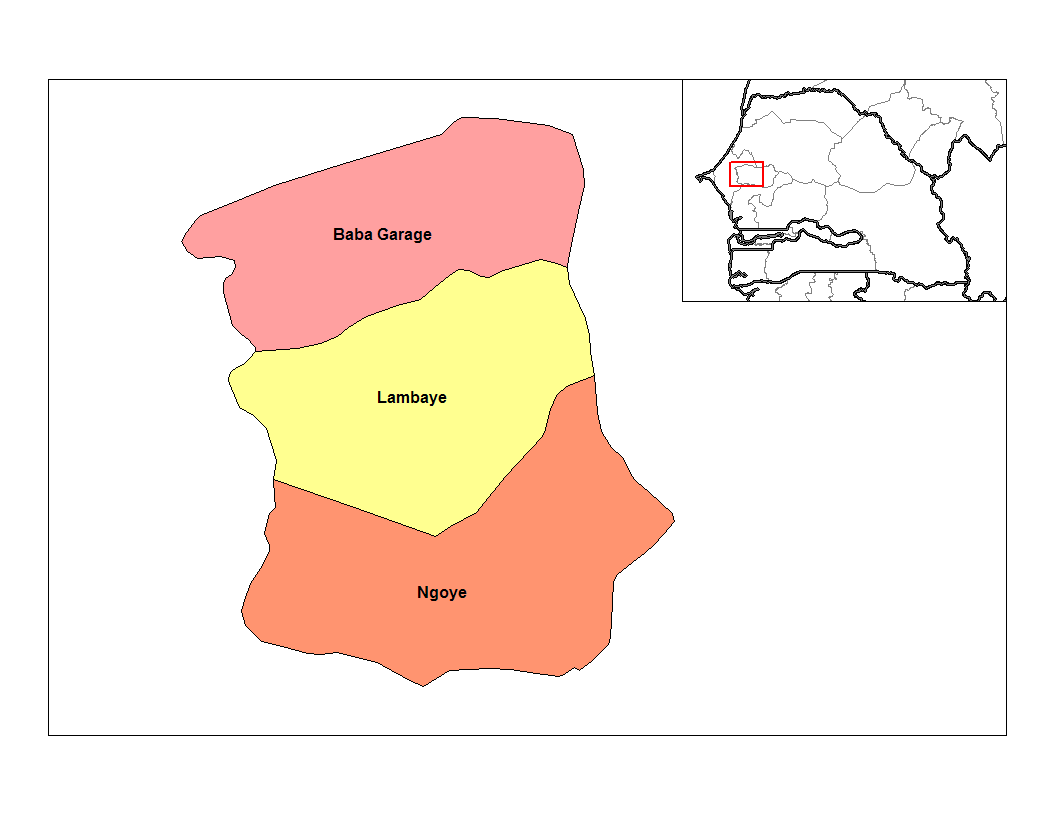
Arrondissements of Bambey

These arrondissement are in the Bambey Department in the Diourbel Region of Senegal. Each arrondissement is further divided administratively into rural communities and in turn into villages.

- Baba Garage Arrondissement
- Lambaye Arrondissement
- Ngoye Arrondissement

== Bignona ==
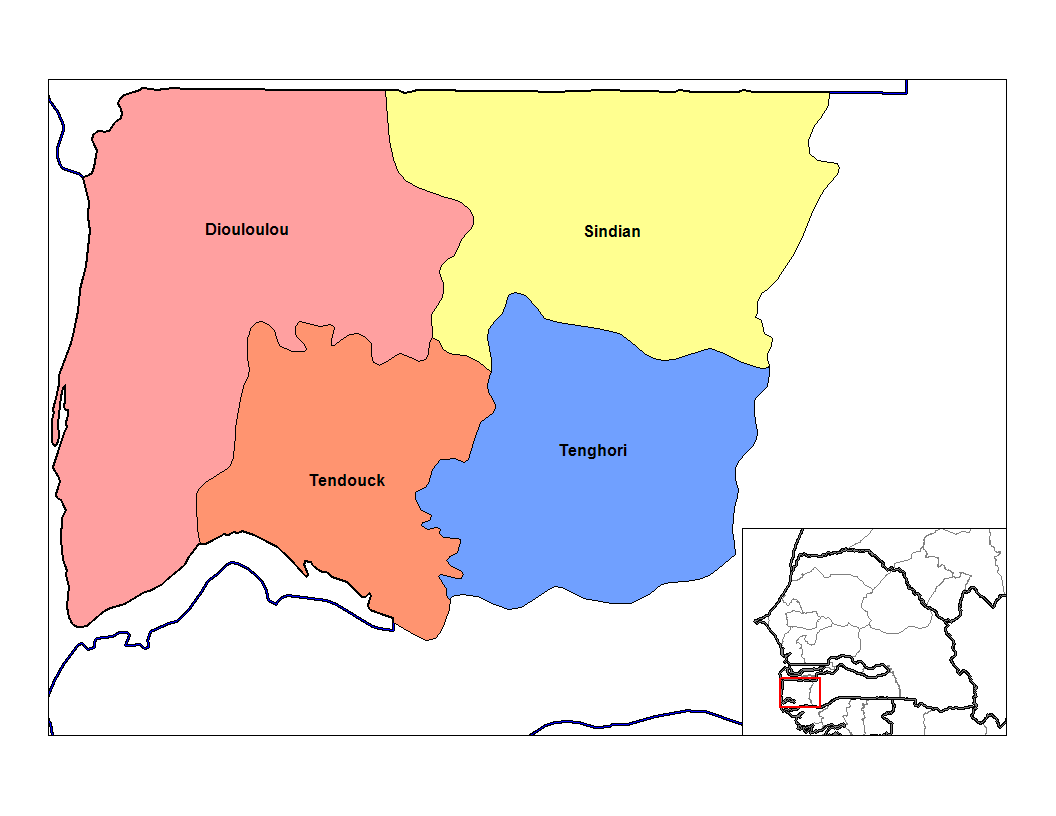
Arrondissements of Bignona

- Kataba Arrondissement
- Sindian Arrondissement
- Tendouck Arrondissement
- Tenghori Arrondissement

== Birkilane ==
- Keur Mboucki Arrondissement
- Mabo Arrondissement

== Bounkiling ==
- Boghal Arrondissement
- Bona Arrondissement
- Diaroumé Arrondissement

== Dagana ==
- Arrondissement of Mbane
- Arrondissement of Ndiaye

== Dakar ==
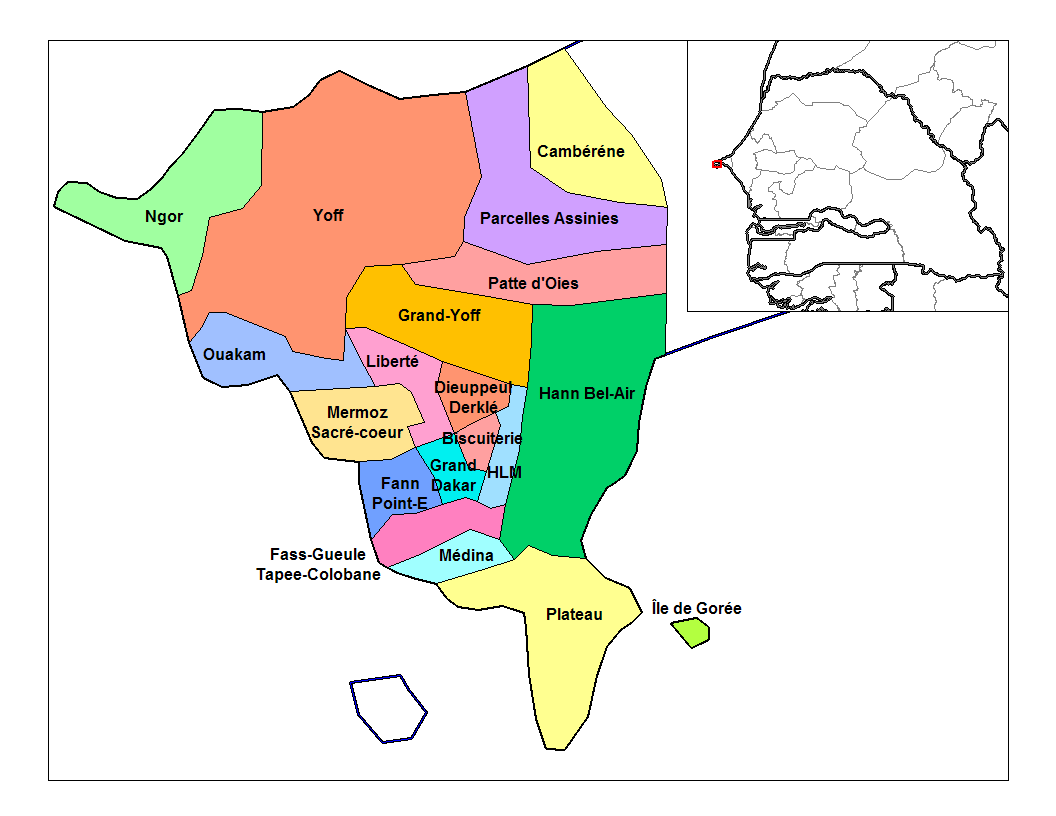
Communes d'arrondissement of Dakar

- Almadies Arrondissement - divided into 4 communes d'arrondissement.
- Grand Dakar Arrondissement - divided into 6 communes d'arrondissement
- Parcelles Assainies Arrondissement - divided into 4 communes d'arrondissement
- Plateau/Gorée Arrondissement - divided into 5 communes d'arrondissement

== Diourbel ==
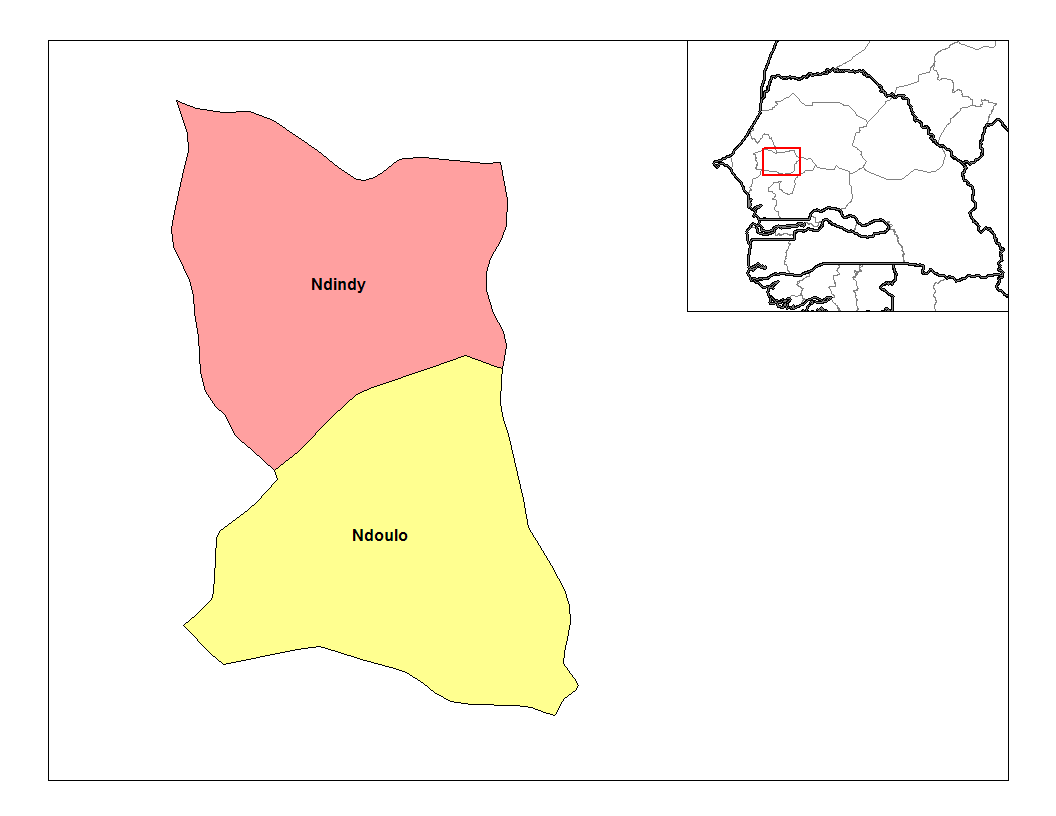
Arrondissements of Diourbel

- Ndindy Arrondissement
- Ndoulo Arrondissement

== Fatick ==
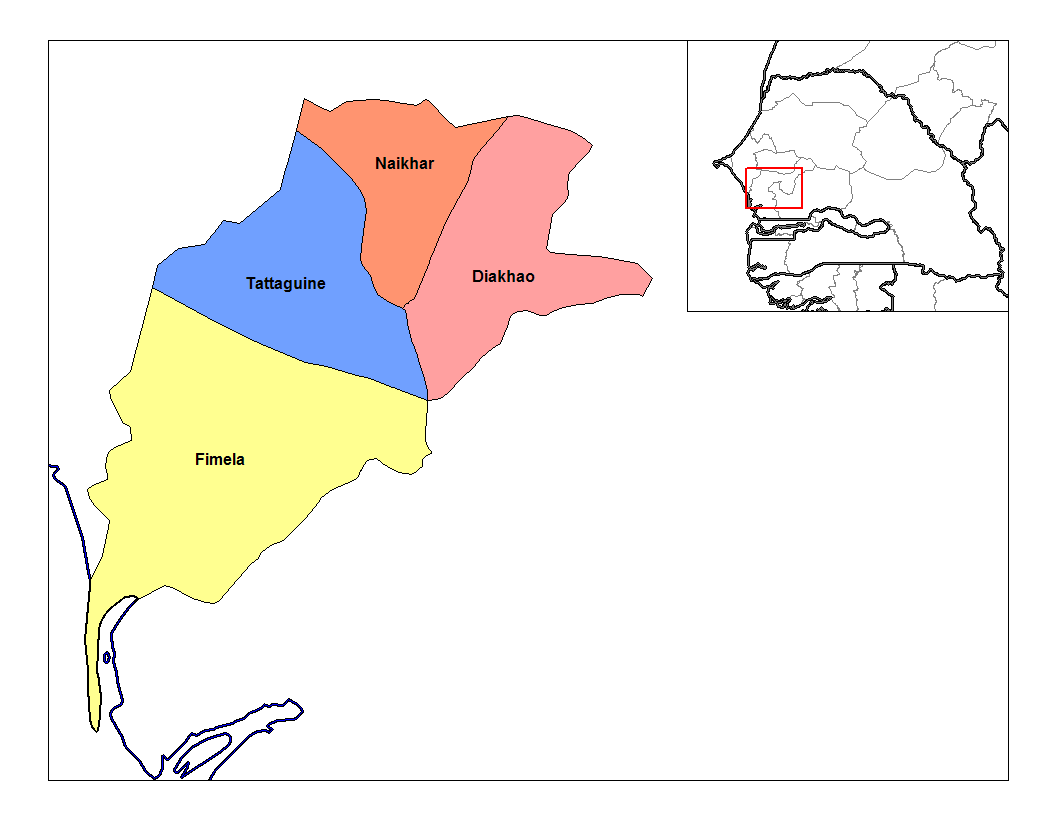
Arrondissements of Fatick

- Diakhao Arrondissement
- Fimela Arrondissement
- Naikhar Arrondissement
- Tattaguine Arrondissement

== Foundiougne ==
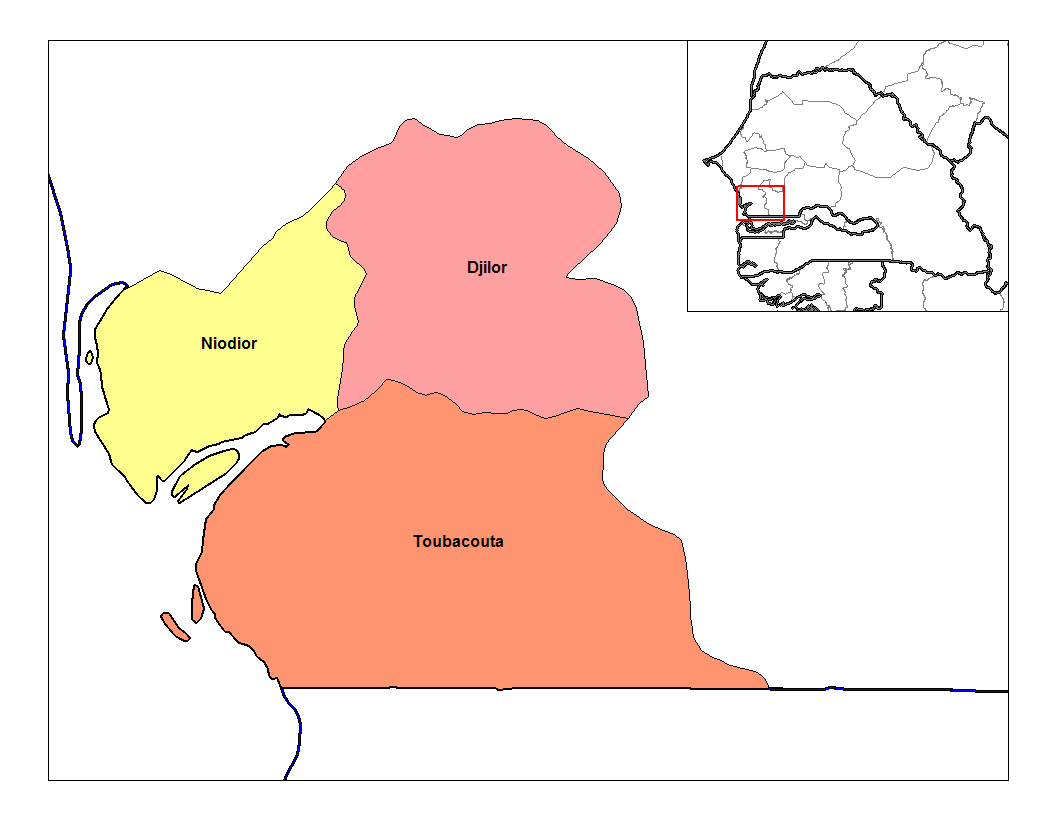
Arrondissements of Foundiougne

- Djilor Arrondissement
- Niodior Arrondissement
- Toubacouta Arrondissement

== Gossas ==
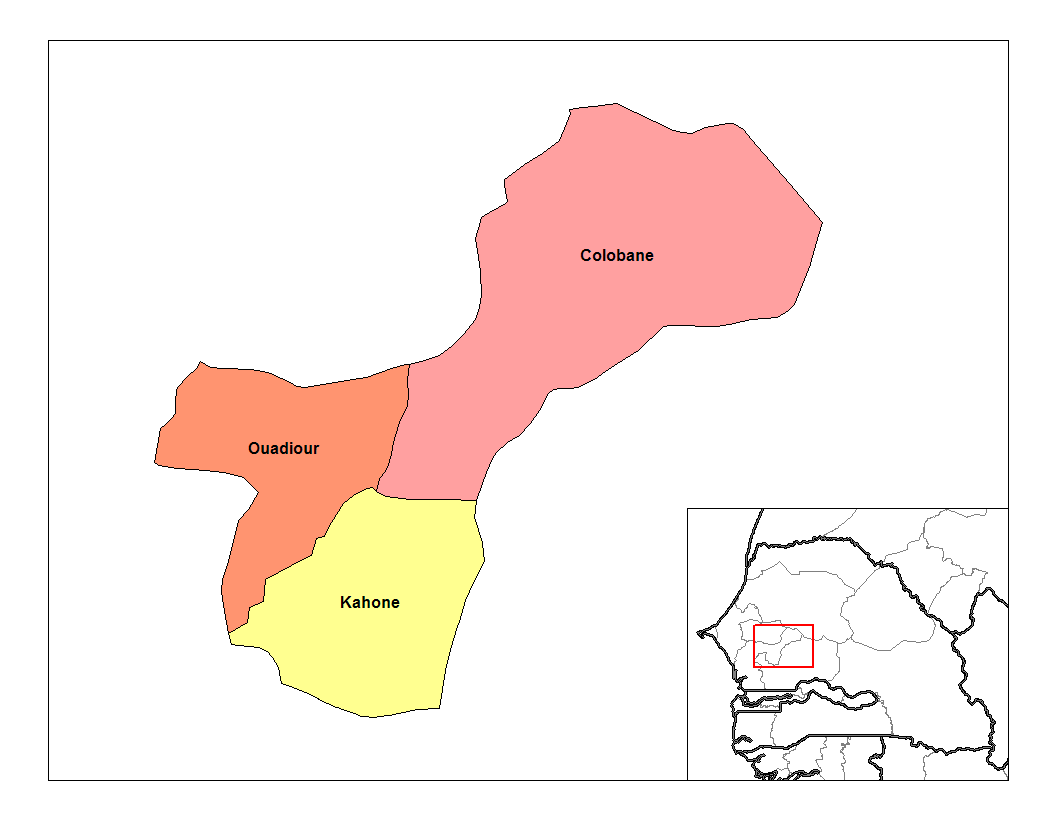
Arrondissements of Gossas

- Colobane Arrondissement
- Ouadiour Arrondissement

== Goudiry ==
- Bala Arrondissement
- Boynguel Bamba Arrondissement
- Dianké Makha Arrondissement
- Koulor Arrondissement

== Guédiawaye ==
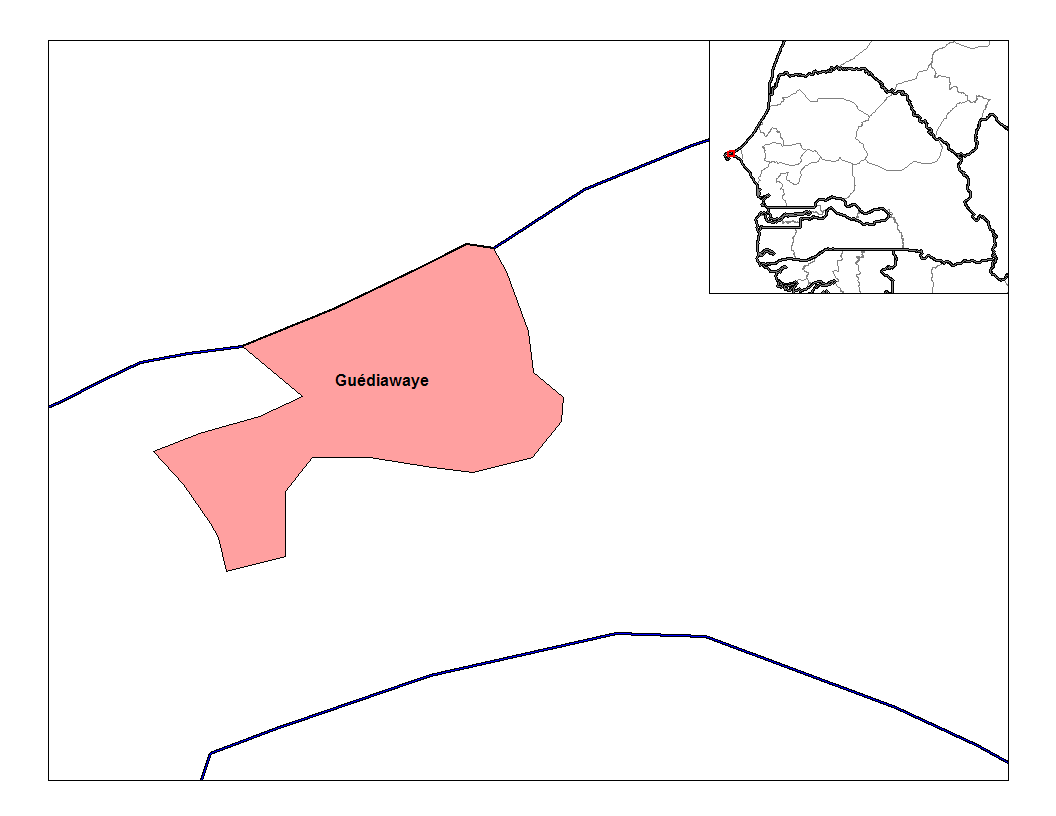
Arrondissement of Guédiawaye

- Guédiawaye Arrondissement - divided into 5 communes d'arrondissement.

== Goudomp ==
- Djibanar Arrondissement
- Simbandi Brassou Arrondissement
- Karantaba Arrondissement

== Guinguinéo ==
- Mbadakhoune Arrondissement
- Nguélou Arrondissement

== Kaffrine ==
Note: As of 2006, Koungheul and the eastern section was removed from Kaffrine Department to form Koungheul Department. In 2008, Kaffrine became a Region in its own right, while Birkelene, Koungheul and Malem Hodar became departments within the new Region.

- Gniby Arrondissement
- Katakel Arrondissement

== Kanel ==
- Orkadiere Arrondissement
- Wouro Sidy Arrondissement

== Kaolack ==
- Koumbal Arrondissement
- Ndiedieng Arrondissement
- Ngothie Arrondissement

== Kébémer ==
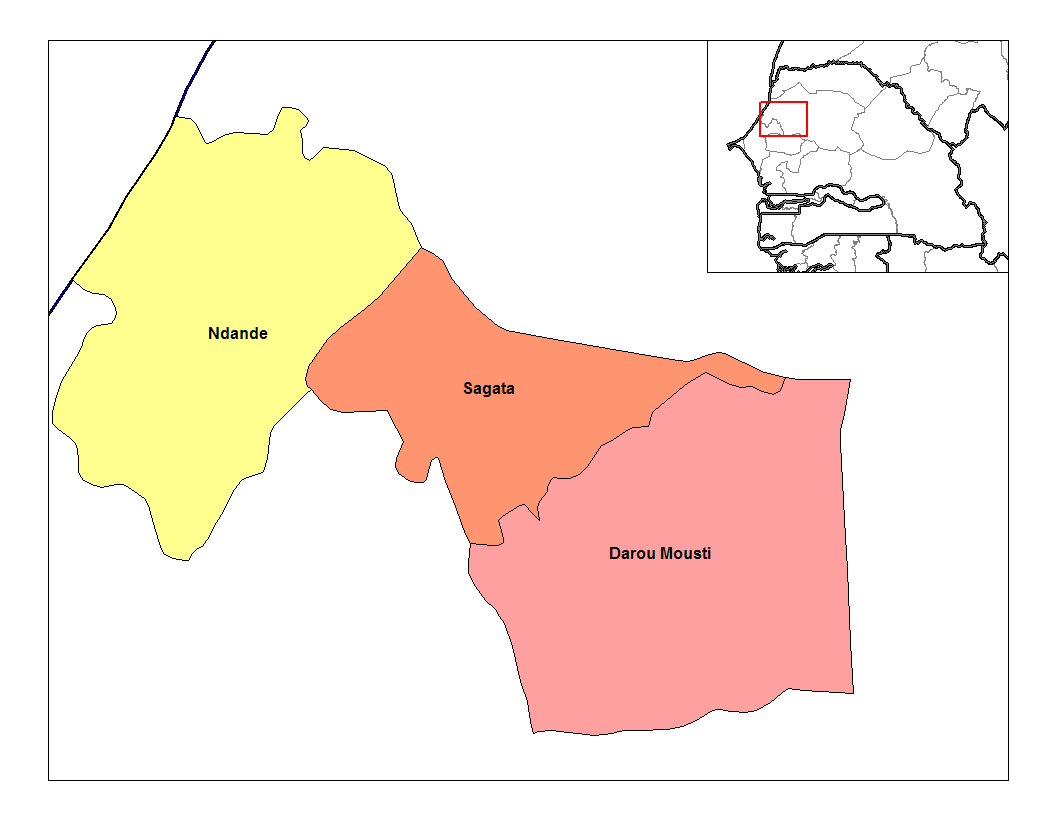
Arrondissements of Kébémer

- Darou Mousti Arrondissement
- Ndande Arrondissement
- Sagata Arrondissement

== Kédougou ==
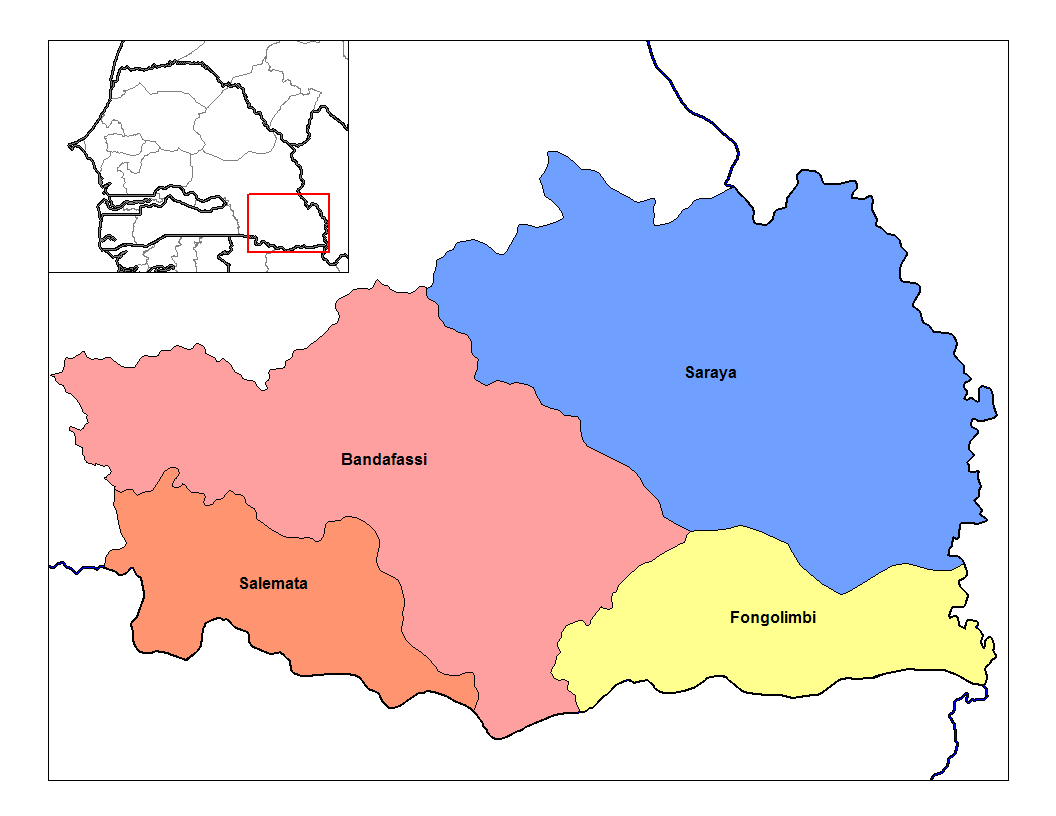
Arrondissements of Kédougou

- Bandafassi Arrondissement
- Fongolimbi Arrondissement

== Kolda ==
- Djoulacolon Arrondissement
- Mampatim Arrondissement
- Saré Bidji Arrondissement

== Koumpentoum ==
- Bamba Thialène Arrondissement
- Kouthiaba Wolof Arrondissement

== Koungheul ==
- Ida Mouride Arrondissement
- Lour Escale Arrondissement
- Missirah Wadene Arrondissement

== Linguère ==
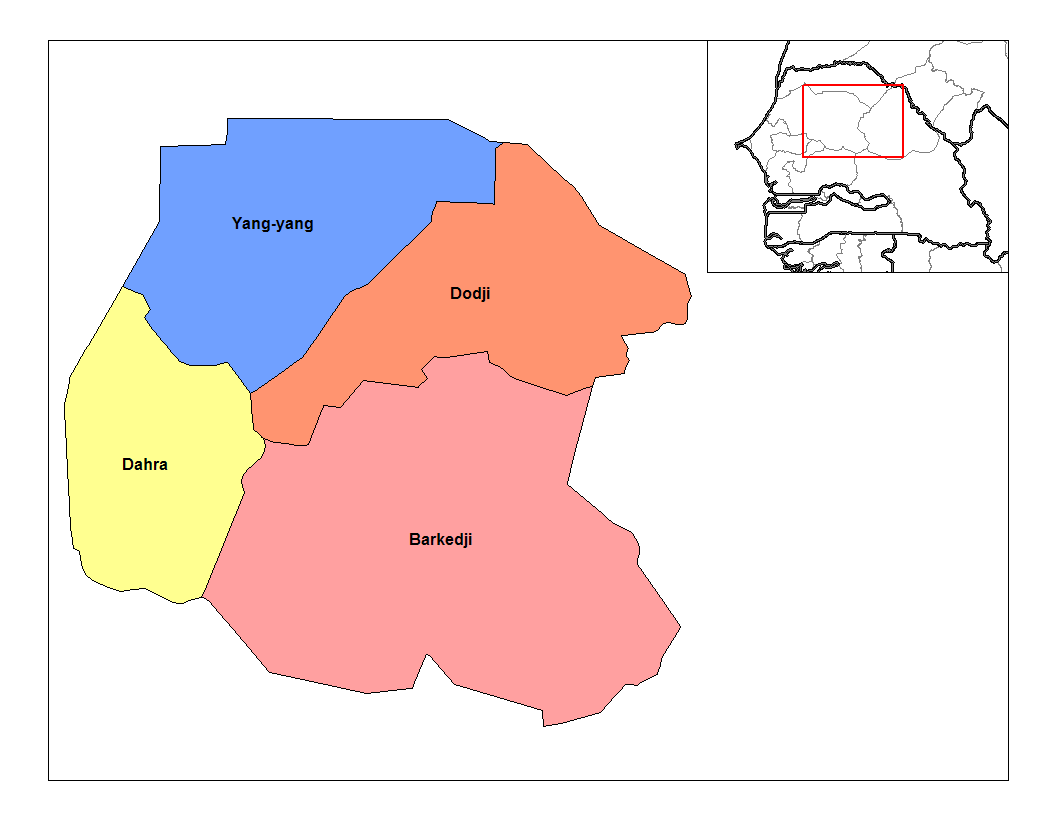
Arrondissements of Linguère

- Barkedji Arrondissement
- Dodji Arrondissement
- Sagatta Dioloff Arrondissement
- Yang-Yang Arrondissement

== Louga ==
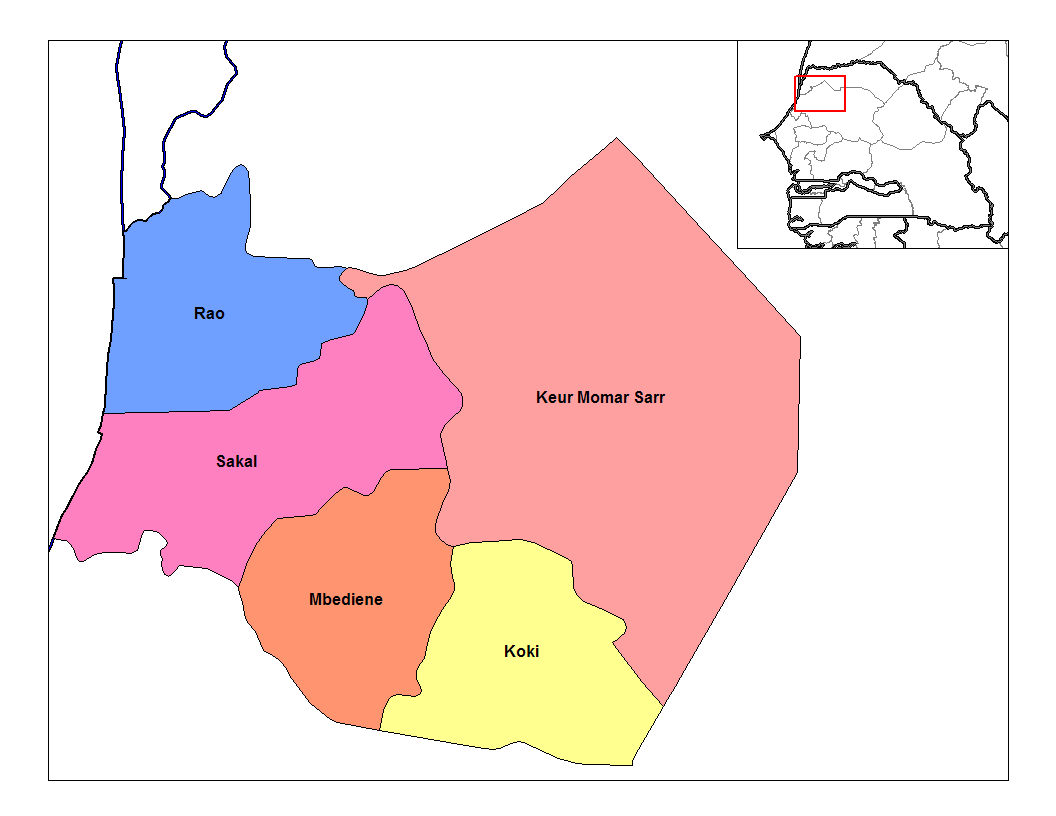
Arrondissements of Louga

- Keur Momar Sarr Arrondissement
- Koki Arrondissement
- Mbédiène Arrondissement
- Sakal Arrondissement

== M'bour ==
- Fissel Arrondissement
- Séssène Arrondissement
- Sindia Arrondissement

== Malem Hodar ==
- Darou Minam Arrondissement
- Sagna Arrondissement

== Matam ==
- Agnam Civol Arrondissement
- Ogo Arrondissement

== Mbacké ==
- Kael Arrondissement
- Ndame Arrondissement
- Taïf Arrondissement

== Médina Yoro Foulah ==
- Fafacourou Arrondissement
- Ndorna Arrondissement
- Niaming Arrondissement

== Nioro du Rip ==
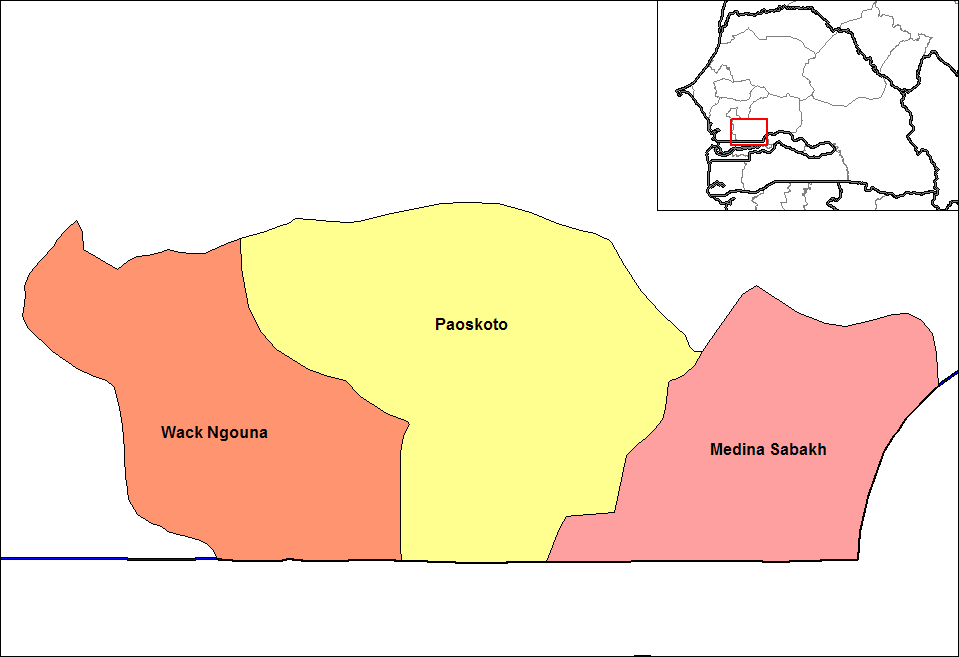
Arrondissements of Nioro du Rip

- Medina Sabakh Arrondissement
- Paoskoto Arrondissement
- Wack Ngouna Arrondissement

== Oussouye ==
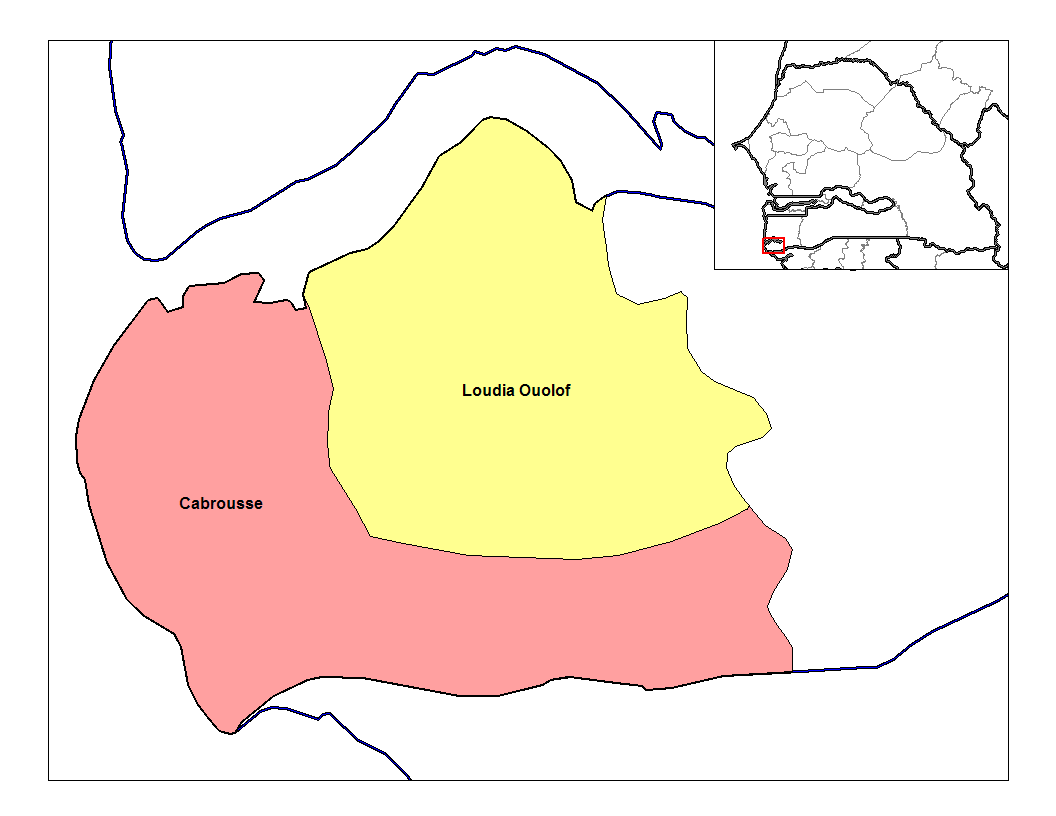
Arrondissements of Oussouye

- Cabrousse Arrondissement
- Loudia Ouolof Arrondissement

== Pikine ==
- Dagoudane Arrondissement - divided into 7 communes d'arrondissement
- Niayes Arrondissement - divided into 4 communes d'arrondissement
- Thiaroye Arrondissement - divided into 5 communes d'arrondissement

== Podor ==
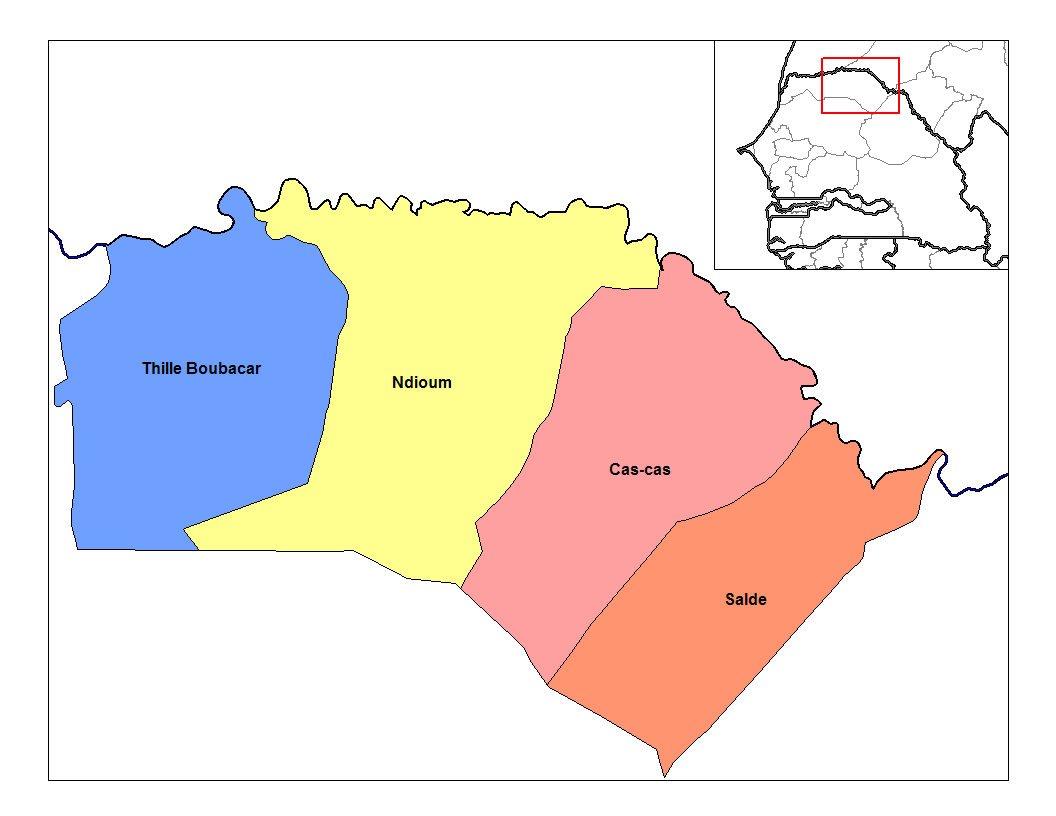
Arrondissements of Podor

- Cas-Cas Arrondissement
- Gamadji Saré Arrondissement
- Salde Arrondissement
- Thille Boubacar Arrondissement

== Ranérou Ferlo ==
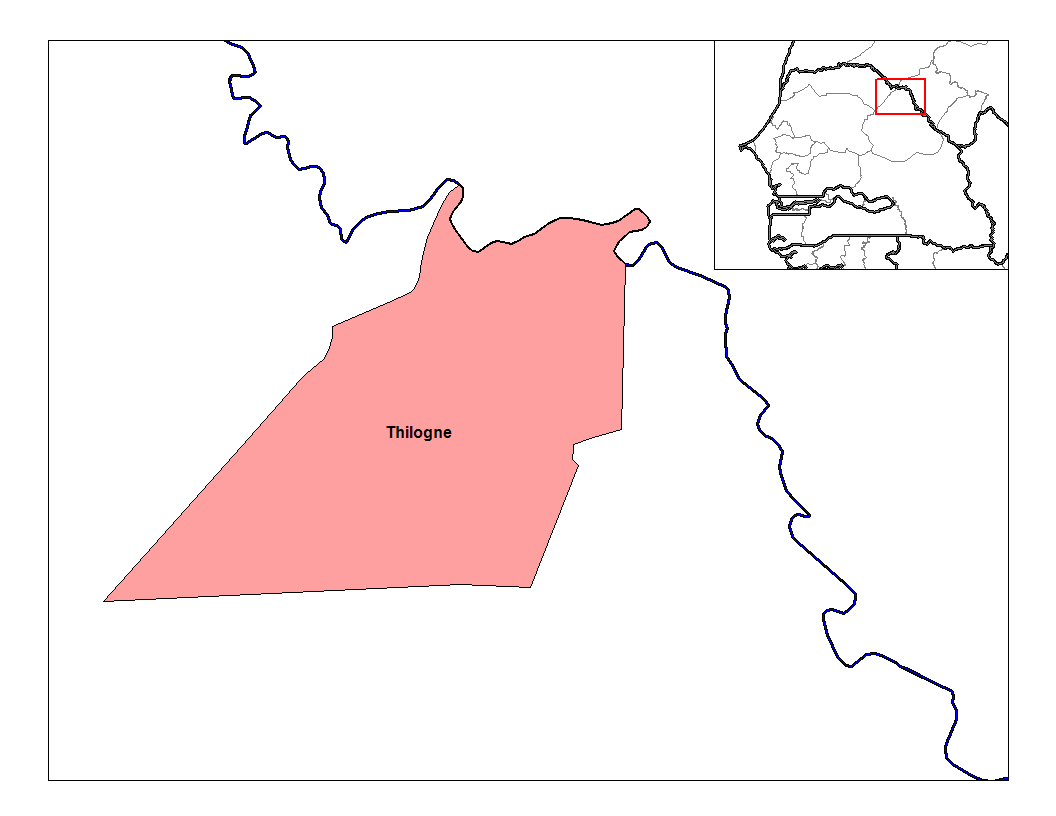
Arrondissement of Ranérou Ferlo

- Vélingara Arrondissement

== Rufisque ==
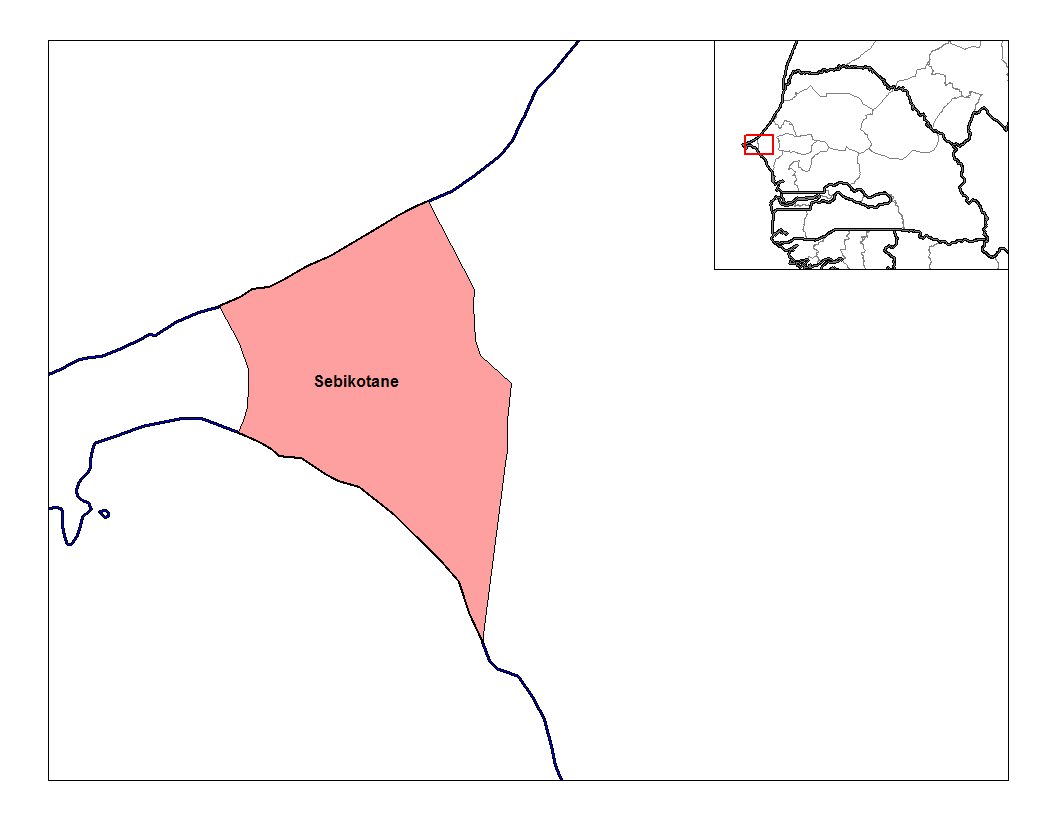
Arrondissement of Rufisque

- Rufisque Arrondissement - includes 3 communes d'arrondissement
- Sebikotane Arrondissement

== Saint-Louis ==
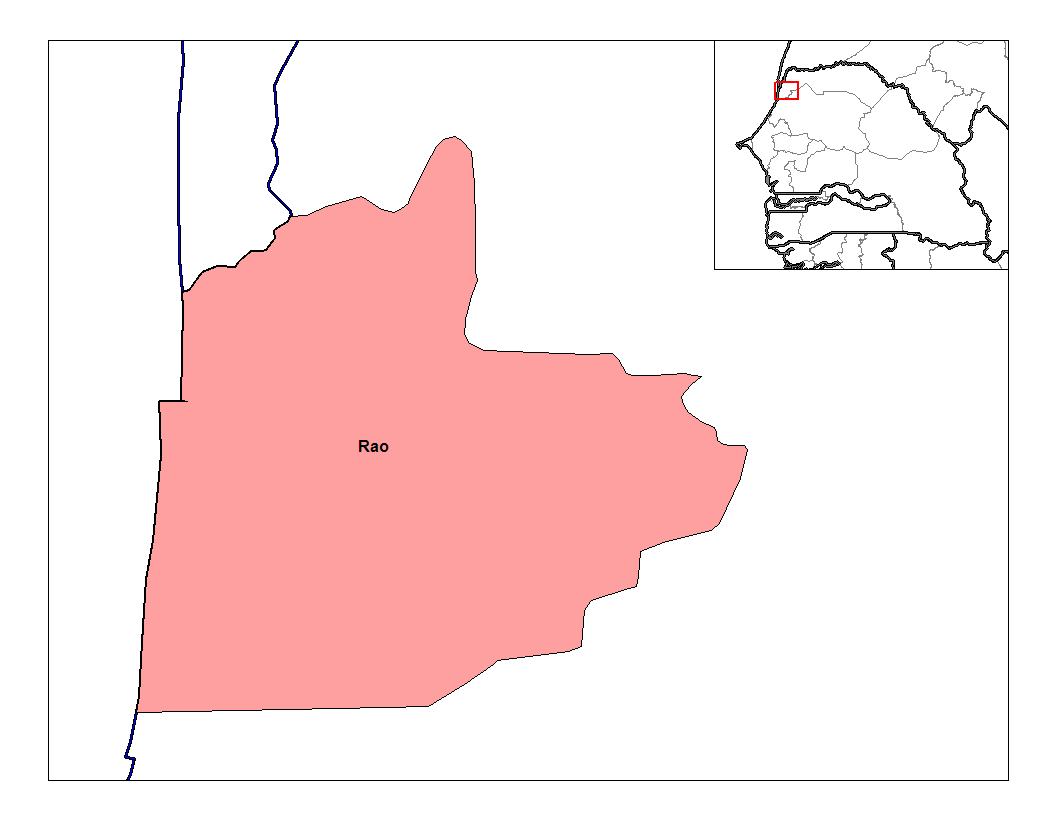
Arrondissement of Saint-Louis

- Rao Arrondissement

== Salemata ==
- Dakateli Arrondissement
- Dar Salam Arrondissement

== Saraya ==
- Bembou Arrondissement
- Sabodala Arrondissement

== Sédhiou ==
- Diende Arrondissement
- Djibabouya Arrondissement
- Djiredji Arrondissement

== Tambacounda ==
- Koussanar Arrondissement
- Makacolibantang Arrondissement
- Missirah Arrondissement

== Thiès ==
- Keur Moussa Arrondissement
- Notto Arrondissement
- Thiénaba Arrondissement
- Thiès Nord Arrondissement - a commune d'arrondissement
- Thiès Sud Arrondissement - divided into 2 communes d'arrondissement

== Tivaouane ==
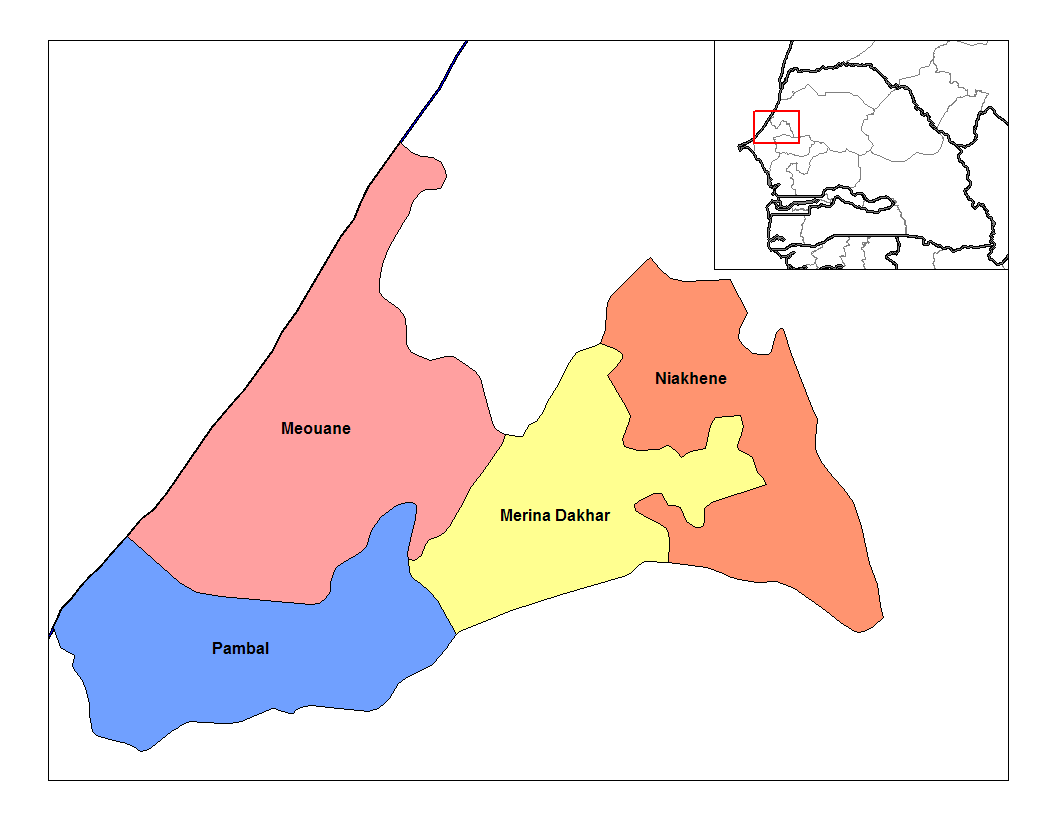
Arrondissements of Tivaouane

- Meouane Arrondissement
- Merina Dakhar Arrondissement
- Niakhene Arrondissement
- Pambal Arrondissement

== Vélingara ==
- Bonconto Arrondissement
- Pakour Arrondissement
- Saré Coly Sallé Arrondissement

== Ziguinchor ==
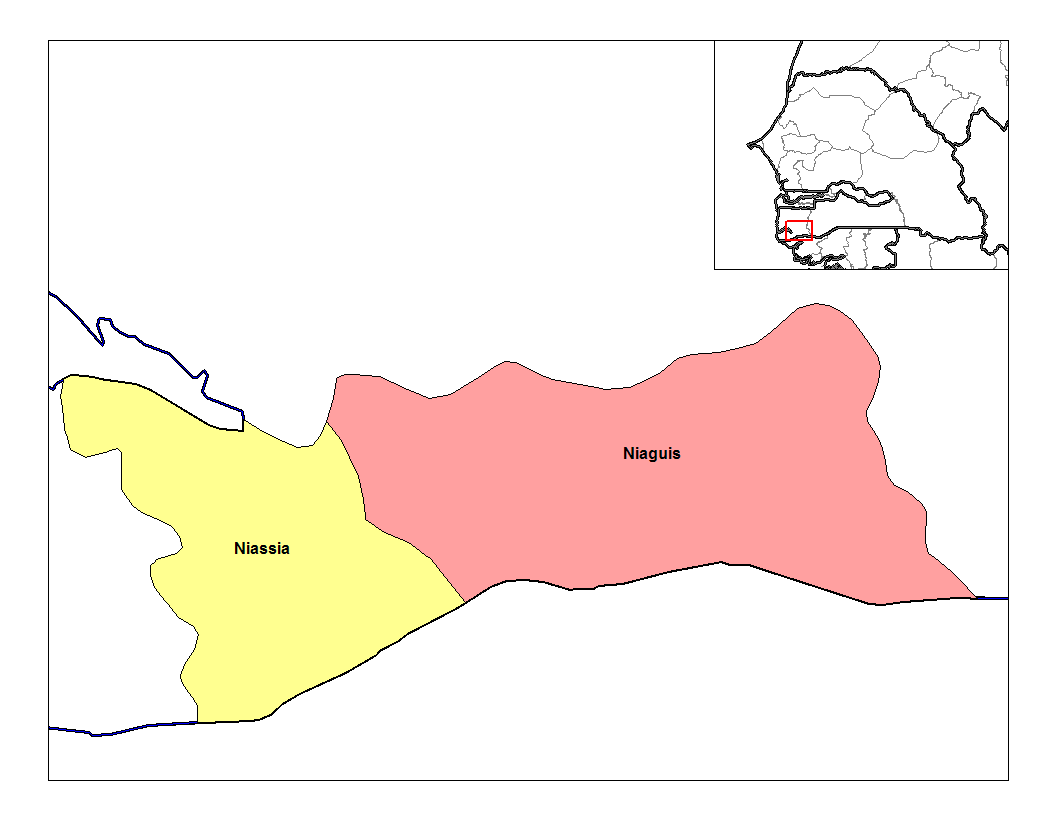
Arrondissements of Ziguinchor

- Niaguis Arrondissement
- Nyassia Arrondissement

== See also ==
- Regions of Senegal
- Departments of Senegal
- Communes of Senegal
