= Bamba Thialène =

Coordinates: 13°48′29.2″N 14°37′5.3″W

- Interactive map of Bamba Thialène
- Country: Senegal
- Region: Tambacounda
- Department: Koumpentoum Department
- Arrondissement: Bamba Thialène
- Rural community: Bamba Thialène
- Time zone: UTC+0 (GMT)

Bamba Thialène is the name of a settlement (and the local district (communauté rurale) and arrondissement named after it) in the department of Koumpentoum in Tambacounda Region of east Senegal.
