= Bala Arrondissement =

- Arrondissement
- Interactive map of Bala Arrondissement
- Country: Senegal
- Region: Tambacounda Region
- Department: Goudiry Department
- Time zone: UTC±00:00 (GMT)

Bala Arrondissement is an arrondissement of the Goudiry Department in the Tambacounda Region of Senegal.

== Subdivisions ==
The arrondissement is divided administratively into rural communities and in turn into villages.
