= Keur Momar Sarr Arrondissement =

Keur Momar Sarr
- Arrondissement
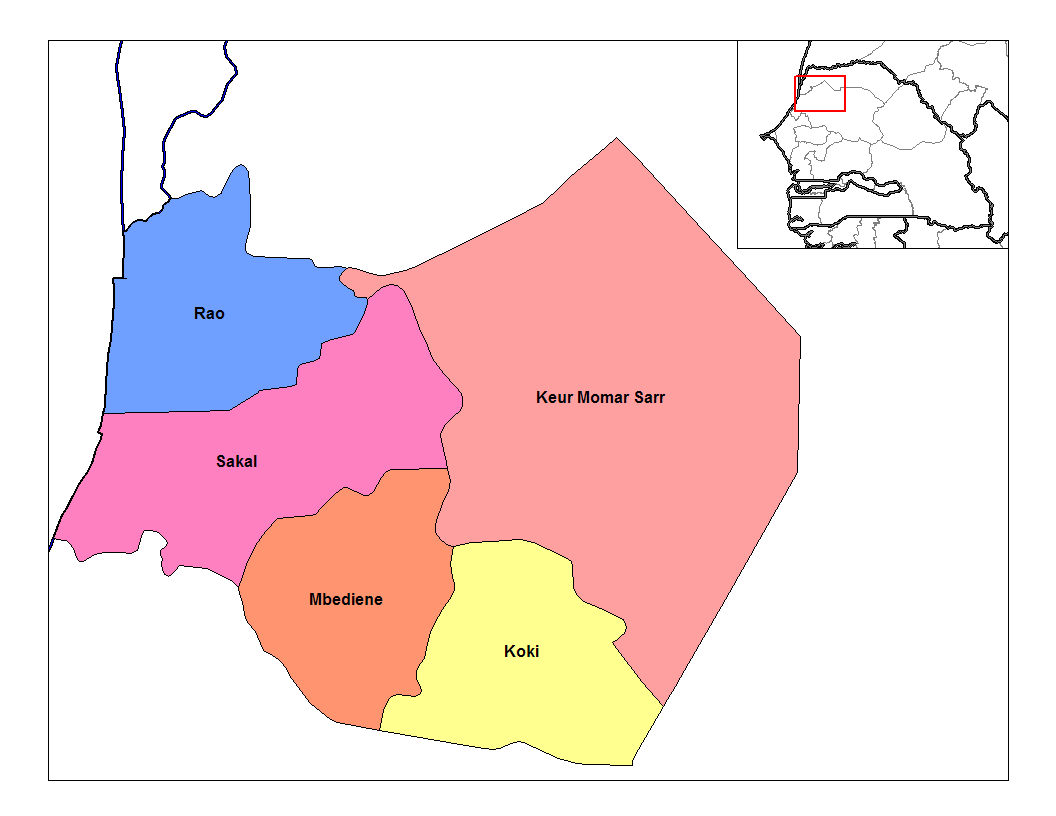
- Location in the Louga Department
- Country: Senegal
- Region: Louga Region
- Department: Louga Department
- Time zone: UTC±00:00 (GMT)

Keur Momar Sarr Arrondissement is an arrondissement of the Louga Department in the Louga Region of Senegal. The capital lies at Louga city.

== Subdivisions ==
The arrondissement is divided administratively into rural communities and in turn into villages.
