= Saré Bidji (arrondissement) =

- Arrondissement
- Location within Senegal
- Country: Senegal

Saré Bidji is an arrondissement of Kolda in Kolda Region in Senegal.
