= Thiowor Museum =

- Established: January 22, 2020; 5 years ago
- Location: Thiowor, Senegal
- Coordinates: 15.729979°N 16.456676°W
- Type: History museum

The Thiowor Museum (French: Musée de Thiowor), known as Case du Tirailleur, is a museum located in the Louga Department, Senegal.

== History ==
In 2007, the Association of Friends of the Museum of the Armed Forces came up with the idea of building a museum to pay tribute to Abdoulaye Ndiaye. The French government participated in the creation of the museum. The museum opened for the first time in January 2020. The inauguration of the museum was attended by the Minister of the Armed Forces, Sidiki Kaba, as well as diplomats from 17 African countries. The opening ceremony was also attended by Vice Admiral Cheikh Bara Cissokh and the First Counselor of the French Embassy in Senegal, Agnès Humruzian.

== Collections ==
The museum contains personal objects and photos about the history of Abdoulaye Ndiaye who was born in Thiowor, in addition the museum contains Abdoulaye's hut which was made of straw. The restoration of the hut was carried out by the delegation of the Souvenir Français in Senegal. In addition, the museum includes a bed of Abdoulaye and has panels on the history of the tirailleurs including parts such as their participation in the First World War.
