= Mbédiène Arrondissement =

Mbediene
- Arrondissement
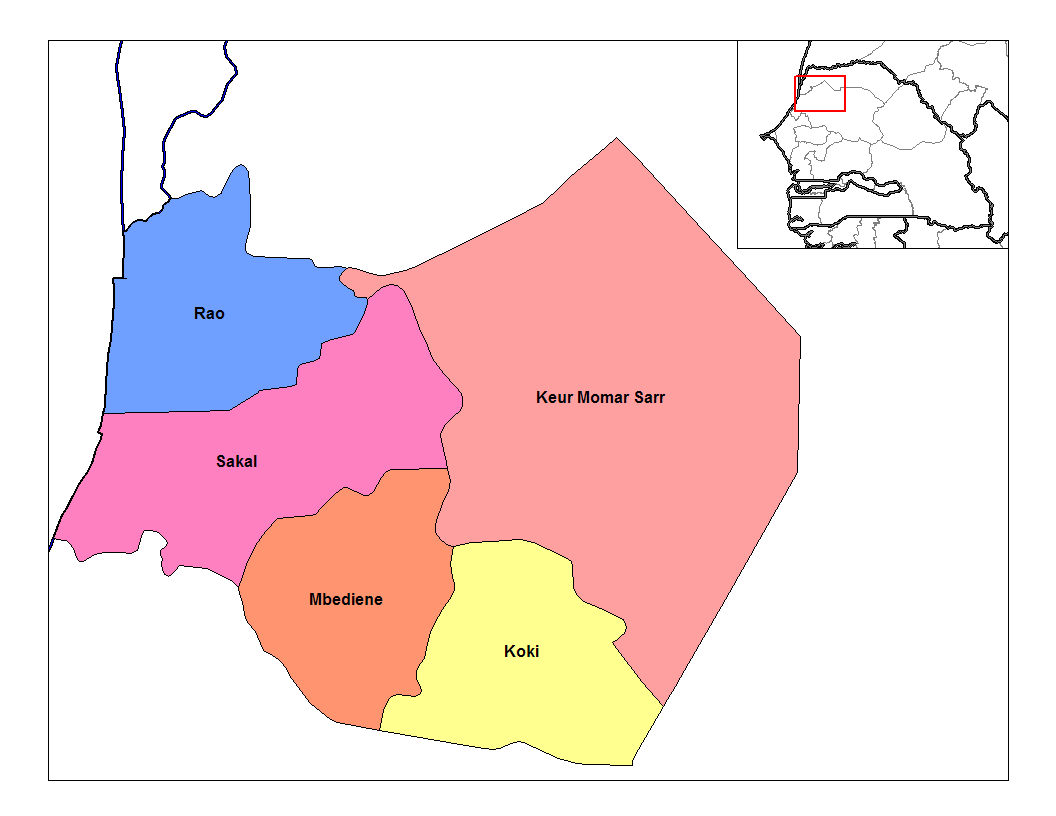
- Location in the Louga Department
- Country: Senegal
- Region: Louga Region
- Department: Louga Department
- Time zone: UTC±00:00 (GMT)

Mbediene Arrondissement is an arrondissement of the Louga Department in the Louga Region of Senegal.

== Subdivisions ==
The arrondissement is divided administratively into rural communities and in turn into villages.
