= Dianké Makha =

- Arrondissement
- Interactive map of Dianké Makha
- Location within Senegal
- Coordinates: 13°40′37″N 12°39′40″W
- Country: Senegal
- Region: Tambacounda Region
- Department: Goudiry Department

Dianké Makha is an arrondissement of Goudiry Department in Tambacounda Region in Senegal.
