= Boynguel Bamba =

- Arrondissement
- Interactive map of Boynguel Bamba
- Location within Senegal
- Coordinates: 14°05′48″N 12°56′12″W
- Country: Senegal
- Region: Tambacounda Region
- Department: Goudiry Department

Boynguel Bamba is an arrondissement of Goudiry Department in Tambacounda Region in Senegal.
