= Koulor (arrondissement) =

- Arrondissement
- Location within Senegal
- Country: Senegal

Koulor is an arrondissement of Goudiry in Tambacounda Region in Senegal.
