= Mabo =

Mabo may refer to:

== Places ==
- Mabo, Togo, a village in Togo
- Mabo Arrondissement, an area in Kaffrine Region, Senegal

== People and related topics ==
- Eddie Mabo (1936–1992), the Torres Strait Islander man who instigated the 1992 test case for native title over his people's land
  - Mabo (film), a 2012 Australian telemovie about Eddie Mabo's battle for Aboriginal land title rights
  - Mabo v Queensland (No 1) (1988), court case striking down the Queensland Coast Islands Declaratory Act 1985 (Qld.) under the Racial Discrimination Act 1975 (Cth.)
  - Mabo v Queensland (No 2) (1992), court case recognising native title in Australia for the first time
  - Mabo: Life of an Island Man, a 1997 documentary film produced and co-directed by Trevor Graham
- Bonita Mabo (c.1943–2018), Australian educator and activist, wife of Eddie
- Gail Mabo (born 1965), daughter of Eddie and Bonita Mabo

== See also ==
- Ma Bo (born 1947), Chinese writer
- Mabo tofu, alternative spelling for mapo tofu, a Chinese dish from Sichuan
