= Diaroumé (arrondissement) =

- Arrondissement
- Location within Senegal
- Country: Senegal

Diaroumé is an arrondissement of Bounkiling in Sédhiou Region in Senegal.
