= Sagatta Dioloff (arrondissement) =

- Arrondissement
- Location within Senegal
- Country: Senegal

Sagatta Dioloff is an arrondissement of Linguère in Louga Region in Senegal.
