= Bembou (arrondissement) =

- Arrondissement
- Location within Senegal
- Country: Senegal

Bembou is an arrondissement of Saraya in Kédougou Region in Senegal.
