= Nguélou (arrondissement) =

- Arrondissement
- Location within Senegal
- Country: Senegal

Nguélou is an arrondissement of Guinguinéo in Kaolack Region in Senegal.
