= Darou Mousti Arrondissement =

Darou Mousti
- Arrondissement
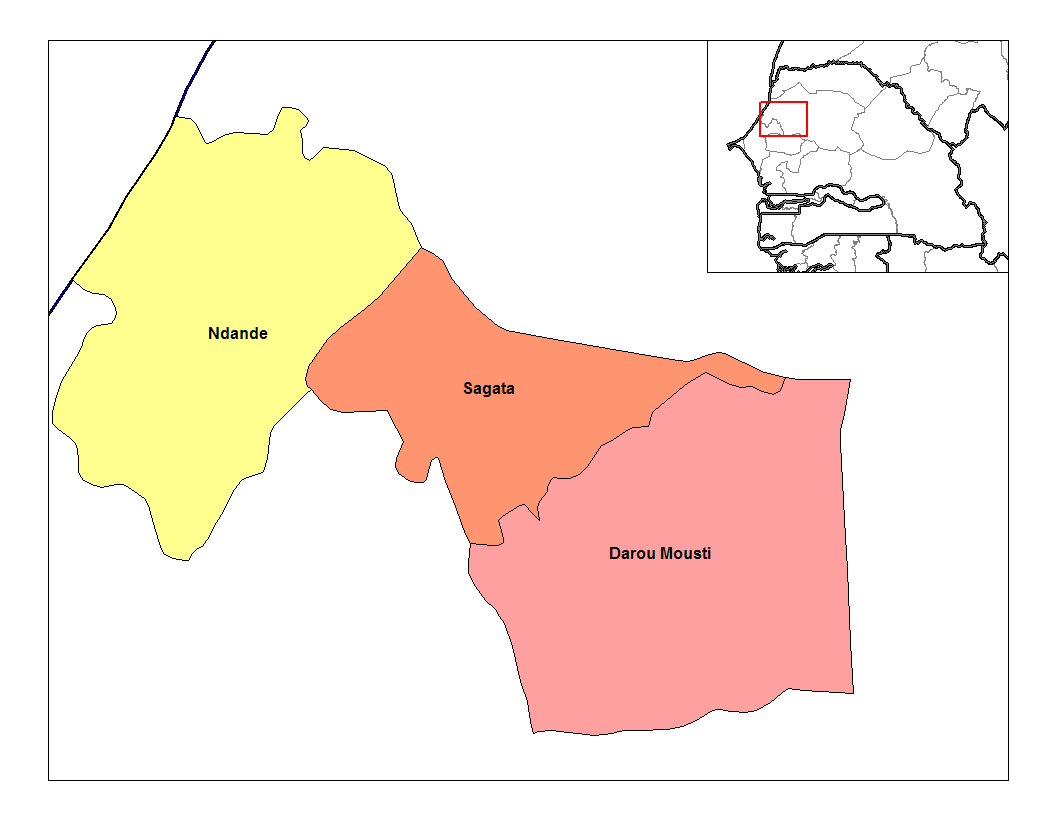
- Location in the Kébémer Department
- Country: Senegal
- Region: Louga Region
- Department: Kébémer Department
- Time zone: UTC±00:00 (GMT)

Darou Mousti Arrondissement is an arrondissement of the Kébémer Department in the Louga Region of Senegal.

== Subdivisions ==
The arrondissement is divided administratively into rural communities and in turn into villages.
