= Karantaba (arrondissement) =

- Arrondissement
- Location within Senegal
- Country: Senegal

Karantaba is an arrondissement of Goudomp in Sédhiou Region in Senegal.
