= Bona (arrondissement) =

- Arrondissement
- Location within Senegal
- Country: Senegal

Bona is an arrondissement of Bounkiling in Sédhiou Region in the country of Senegal.
