= Agnam Civol (arrondissement) =

- Arrondissement
- Interactive map of Agnam Civol
- Coordinates: 16°0′24.979″N 13°41′16.044″W
- Country: Senegal

Agnam Civol is an arrondissement of Matam in Matam Region in Senegal.
