= Séssène (arrondissement) =

- Arrondissement
- Location within Senegal
- Country: Senegal

Séssène is an arrondissement of M'bour in Thiès Region in Senegal.
