= Katakel (arrondissement) =

- Arrondissement
- Location within Senegal
- Country: Senegal

Katakel is an arrondissement of Kaffrine in Kaffrine Region in Senegal.
