= Mbadakhoune (arrondissement) =

- Arrondissement
- Location within Senegal
- Coordinates: 14°12′26″N 16°1′13″W
- Country: Senegal

Area
  - Total: 55.8 sq mi (144.6 km^{2})

Population (2023)
  - Total: 25,409

Mbadakhoune is an arrondissement of Guinguinéo in Kaolack Region in Senegal. The arrondissement borders the northeast of the city of Kaolack. The seat lies in the town of Mbadakhoune, which is roughly 8.8 square kilometres (3.4 sq mi) by road northeast of the centre of Kaolack, immediately northeast of the outskirts of the city. In 2023 the arrondissement had a population of 25,409 in an area of 144.6 square kilometres (55.8 sq mi).

== Subdivisions ==
Mbadakhoune contains four rural communities (communauté rurale):

- Khelcom Birane
- Mbadakhoune
- Ndiago
- Ngathie Naoudé

== Landmarks ==
To the south-southeast of the town of Mbadakhoune is the Université du Sine Saloum - site de Kaolack. To the southwest of the town, along the main road to Kaolack, is the Darou Miraya school.
