= Niaming (arrondissement) =

- Arrondissement
- Location within Senegal
- Country: Senegal

Niaming is an arrondissement of Médina Yoro Foulah which is found in the Kolda Region in Senegal.
