= Goudiry =

- Town and commune
- Location in Senegal
- Coordinates: 14°11′N 12°43′W
- Country: Senegal
- Region: Tambacounda
- Department: Goudiry

Area
  - Town and commune: 6.26 km^{2} (2.42 sq mi)

Population (2023 census)
  - Town and commune: 10,540
  - Density: 1,680/km^{2} (4,360/sq mi)
- Time zone: UTC+0 (GMT)

Goudiry is the chief town and an urban commune of the department of Goudiry in the region of Tambacounda in the east of Senegal. The commune has a population of 10,540.

== Transport ==
It lies on the N1 road linking the capital Dakar to Mali and is also served by a station on the national railway system.

== See also ==
- Railway stations in Senegal
