= Missirah Wadene (arrondissement) =

- Arrondissement
- Location within Senegal
- Country: Senegal

Missirah Wadene is an arrondissement of Koungheul in Kaffrine Region in Senegal.
