= Thiès Sud (arrondissement) =

- Arrondissement
- Location within Senegal
- Country: Senegal

Thiès Sud is an arrondissement of Thiès in Thiès Region in Senegal.
