= Djiredji (arrondissement) =

- Arrondissement
- Location within Senegal
- Country: Senegal

Djiredji is an arrondissement of Sédhiou in Sédhiou Region in Senegal. There is a Gendarmerie post in Djiredji.
