= Wouro Sidy Arrondissement =

- Arrondissement
- Interactive map of Wouro Sidy Arrondissement
- Country: Senegal
- Region: Matam Region
- Department: Kanel Department
- Time zone: UTC±00:00 (GMT)

Wouro Sidy Arrondissement is an arrondissement of the Kanel Department in the Matam Region of Senegal.

== Subdivisions ==
The arrondissement is divided administratively into rural communities and in turn into villages.
