= Djibabouya (arrondissement) =

- Arrondissement
- Location within Senegal
- Country: Senegal

Djibabouya is an arrondissement of Sédhiou in Sédhiou Region in Senegal.
