= Fafacourou (arrondissement) =

- Arrondissement
- Location within Senegal
- Country: Senegal

Fafacourou is an arrondissement of Médina Yoro Foulah in Kolda Region in Senegal.
