= Vélingara Arrondissement =

- Arrondissement
- Interactive map of Vélingara Arrondissement
- Country: Senegal
- Region: Matam Region
- Department: Ranérou Ferlo Department
- Time zone: UTC±00:00 (GMT)

Vélingara Arrondissement is the only arrondissement of the Ranérou Ferlo Department in the Matam Region of east Senegal.

== Subdivisions ==
The arrondissement is divided administratively into rural communities and in turn into villages.
