= Ida Mouride (arrondissement) =

Coordinates: 13°59′N 14°40′W

- Arrondissement
- Location within Senegal
- Country: Senegal

Ida Mouride is an arrondissement of Koungheul in Kaffrine Region in Senegal.
