= Gamadji Saré (arrondissement) =

Arrondissement of Podor, Saint-Louis Region, Senegal

Lerabe
- Arrondissement
- Location within Senegal
- Country: Senegal

Gamadji Saré is an arrondissement of Podor in Saint-Louis Region in Senegal.
