= Thille Boubacar Arrondissement =

Thille Boubacar
- Arrondissement
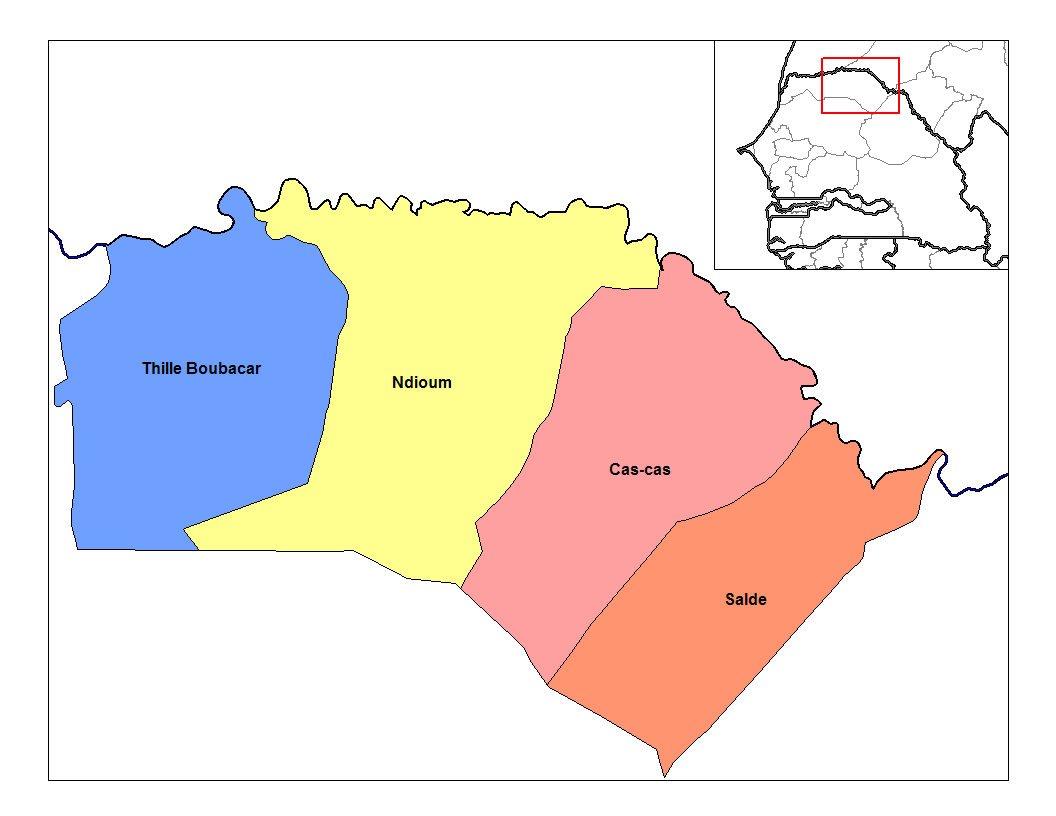
- Location in the Podor Department
- Country: Senegal
- Region: Saint-Louis Region
- Department: Podor Department
- Time zone: UTC±00:00 (GMT)

Thille Boubacar Arrondissement is an arrondissement of the Podor Department in the Saint-Louis Region of Senegal.

== Subdivisions ==
The arrondissement is divided administratively into rural communities and in turn into villages.
