= Sagna (arrondissement) =

- Arrondissement
- Location within Senegal
- Country: Senegal

Sagna is an arrondissement of Malem Hodar in Kaffrine Region in Senegal.
