= Kébémer =

- Town and commune
- Location within Senegal
- Coordinates: 15°22′N 16°26′W
- Country: Senegal
- Region: Louga
- Department: Kébémer

Area
  - Town and commune: 10.97 km^{2} (4.24 sq mi)

Population (2023 census)
  - Town and commune: 27,305
  - Density: 2,489/km^{2} (6,447/sq mi)
- Time zone: UTC+0 (GMT)

Kébémer is a town with commune status in Louga Region in north-west Senegal, lying midway between Thiès and Saint-Louis. It is the chief settlement, with a population of 27,305 in 2023, of the department of the same name.

== History ==
The town was founded in 1774 by a Marabout family.

== Notable residents ==
- Abdoulaye Wade, President of Sénégal 2000-12, was born in Kébémer in 1926.
- Gorgui Dieng, basketball player, was born in Kébémer in 1990.
