= Ndorna (arrondissement) =

- Arrondissement
- Location within Senegal
- Country: Senegal

Ndorna is an arrondissement of Médina Yoro Foulah in Kolda Region in Senegal.
