= Lour Escale (arrondissement) =

- Arrondissement
- Location within Senegal
- Country: Senegal

Lour Escale is an arrondissement of Koungheul in Kaffrine Region in Senegal.
