= Behestan Darou =

Iranian pharmaceutical company

Behestan Darou (P.J.S.C)
- Type: Private Joint Stock
- Industry: Pharmaceuticals
- Founded: 2001
- Headquarters: Tehran, Iran
- Number of employees: 155
- Website: https://www.behestandarou.com

Behestan Darou (Persian: بهستان دارو) is a private joint stock pharmaceutical company based in Tehran, Iran. Founded in 2001, the company is currently one of the largest importers of finished pharmaceutical products in terms of sales and number of products imported. Formed subsequent to the Ministry of Health decision to privatize the Iranian pharmaceutical sector, the company imports and markets more than 300 generic and patented pharmaceuticals from a number of international pharmaceutical manufacturers. Behestan Darou is a subsidiary of Behphar holding. Behestan Darou’s operation currently involves registration, importation and marketing of prescription and consumer healthcare products.

== See also ==
- Health care in Iran
