= Darou Minam =

- Arrondissement
- Location within Senegal
- Country: Senegal
- Region: Kaffrine
- Department: Malem Hodar

Darou Minam is an arrondissement of Malem Hodar Department in the Kaffrine Region of Senegal.
