= Bamba Thialène (arrondissement) =

- Arrondissement
- Location within Senegal
- Country: Senegal

Bamba Thialène is an arrondissement of Koumpentoum in Tambacounda Region in Senegal.
