= Mabo (arrondissement) =

- Arrondissement
- Location within Senegal
- Country: Senegal
- Region: Kaffrine
- Department: Kaffrine

Mabo is an arrondissement in Kaffrine Department, Kaffrine Region, Senegal.
