= Kolda department =

Coordinates: 12.883°N 14.950°W

Kolda
- Department
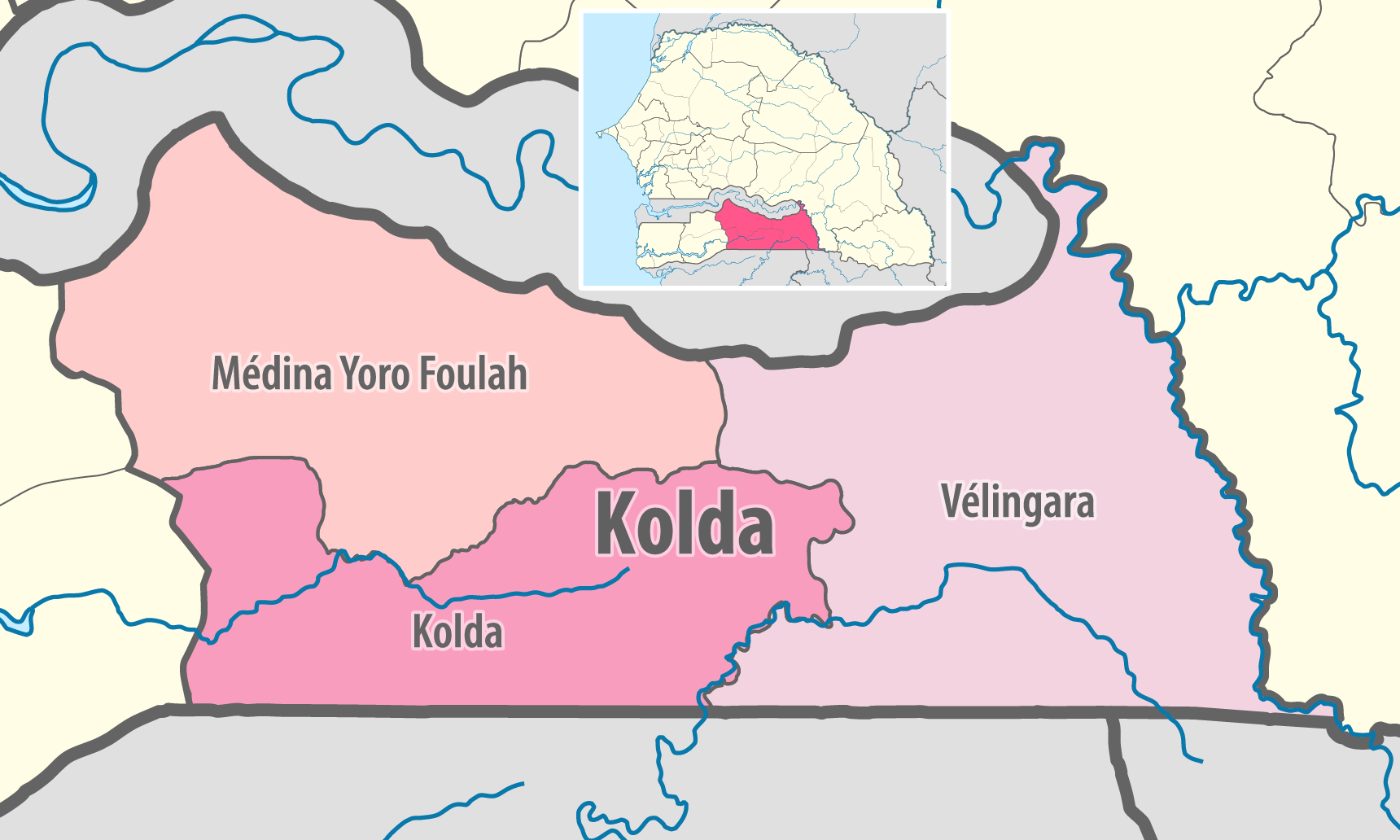
- Location in the Kolda region
- Country: Senegal
- Region: Kolda region
- Capital: Kolda

Area
  - Total: 3,597 km^{2} (1,389 sq mi)

Population (2023 census)
  - Total: 324,434
  - Density: 90.20/km^{2} (233.6/sq mi)
- Time zone: UTC+0 (GMT)

Kolda department is one of the 46 departments of Senegal, located in the Kolda region in the centre of the country.

== Administration ==
The capital settlement of Kolda department is Kolda.

The communes are: Kolda, Dabo, Salikégné, and Saré Yoba Diéga

The rural districts (communautés rurales) comprise:

- Arrondissement of Dioulacolon:
  - Guiro Yéro Bocar
  - Dioulacolon
  - Tankanto Escale
  - Médina El Hadj
- Arrondissement de Mampatim:
  - Dialambéré
  - Médina Chérif
  - Mampatim
  - Bagadadji
  - Coumbacara
- Arrondissement de Saré Bidji:
  - Thiétty
  - Saré Bidji

== History ==
Bg

== Geography ==
=== Population ===
As of December 2002, the population of Kolda Department was 279,849 inhabitants. As of 2005, the population was estimated to have grown to 306,591 people. The Kolda population essentially works on agriculture. Kolda is crossed by the Casamance river, which favours the farmers activities.

=== Historic sites ===
- Kolda Prefecture
