= Gossas department =

Coordinates: 14°29′50″N 16°14′03″W

Gossas
- Department
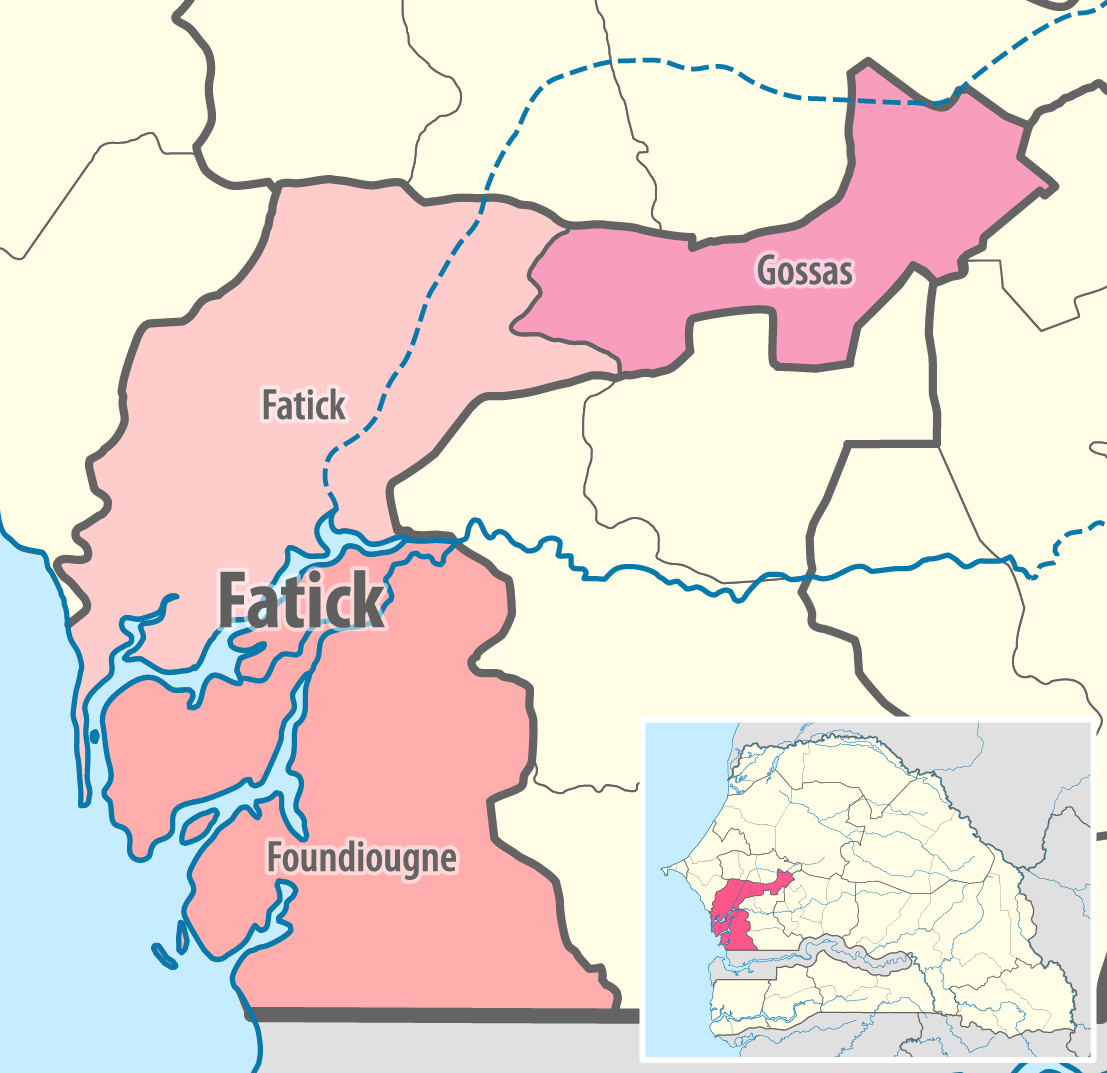
- Location in the Fatick region
- Country: Senegal
- Region: Fatick region
- Capital: Gossas

Area
  - Total: 1,080 km^{2} (420 sq mi)

Population (2023 census)
  - Total: 123,167
  - Density: 114/km^{2} (295/sq mi)
- Time zone: UTC+0 (GMT)

Gossas department is one of the departments of Senegal, located in the Fatick region on the west coast.

== Administrative divisions ==
Within the department lies one commune, the town of Gossas.

The rural districts (communautés rurales) comprise:

- Arrondissement of Colobane:
  - Colobane
  - Mbar
- Arrondissement of Ouadiour:
  - Ndiène Lagane
  - Ouadiour
  - Patar Lia

== Historic sites ==
Gossas commune

- Mausoleum of Serigne Khar Kane
- Mausoleum of Ndamal Gossas (Oumar Guèye)

Gossas département

- Site of Battle of Danki
- Wells of Ndiéné
- Bivouac of El Hadj Umar Tall (Badakhoune)
- Fetishist trees of Gagnick Godjil
- Gouye Ndiouly baobab tree at Kahone, near Kaolack
- Island of Kouyong Keïta, opposite Kahone
- Backwaters of Ngaby and Wagui (Badakhoune)
