= Goudiry department =

Coordinates: 14°10′53″N 12°43′05″W

Goudiry
- Department and arrondissement
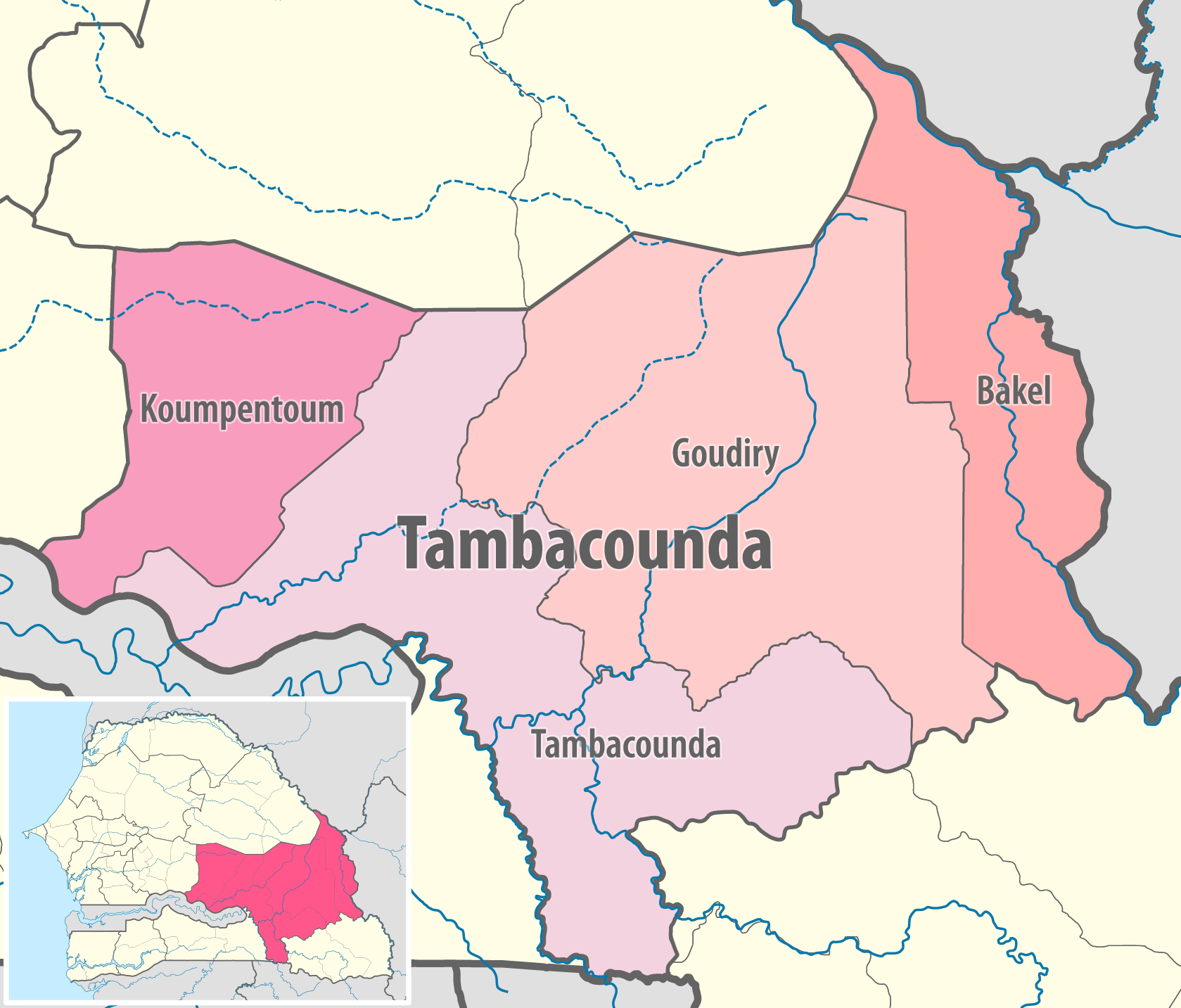
- Country: Senegal
- Region: Tambacounda region
- Capital: Goudiry

Area
  - Total: 16,090 km^{2} (6,210 sq mi)

Population (2023 census)
  - Total: 170,816
  - Density: 10.62/km^{2} (27.50/sq mi)
- Time zone: UTC±00:00 (GMT)

Goudiry department is one of the 46 departments of Senegal, one of four making up the Tambacounda region. It was created by decree in 2008.

The department has two urban communes; Goudiry and Kothiary.

The rest of the department is divided administratively into four arrondissements. In turn, they are divided into the following rural communities (communautés rurales).

- Bala Arrondissement:
  - Bala
  - Koar
  - Goumbayel
- Boynguel Bamba Arrondissement:
  - Boynguel Bamba
  - Sinthiou Mamadou Boubou
  - Koussan
  - Dougué
- Dianké Makha Arrondissement:
  - Dianké Makha
  - Boutoucoufara
  - Bani Israël
  - Komoti
- Koulor Arrondissement:
  - Koulor
  - Sinthiou Bocar Ali
