= Kébémer department =

Coordinates: 15°22′12″N 16°27′00″W

Kébémer
- Department
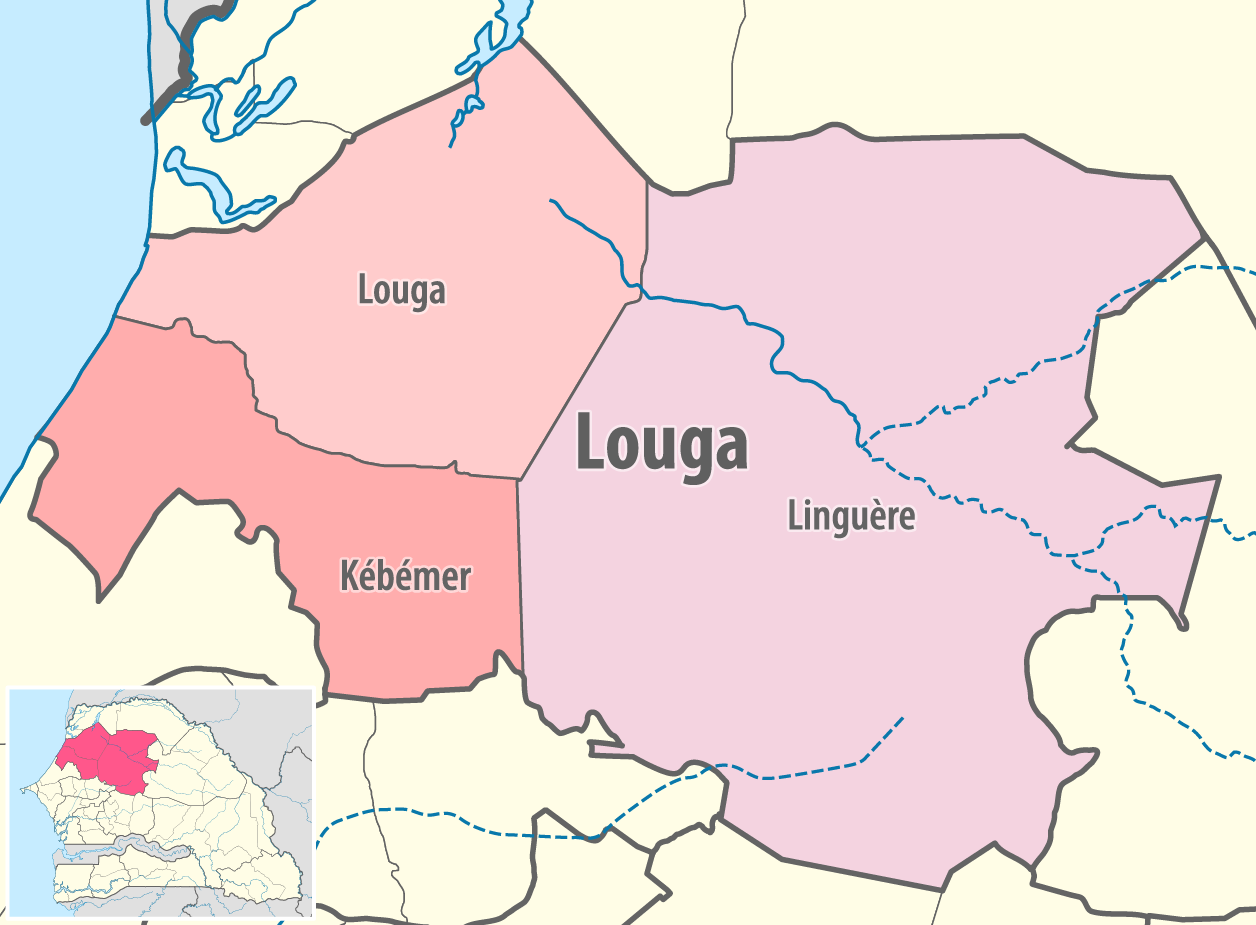
- Location in the Louga region
- Country: Senegal
- Region: Louga region
- Capital: Kébémer

Area
  - Total: 3,823 km^{2} (1,476 sq mi)

Population (2023 census)
  - Total: 336,401
  - Density: 87.99/km^{2} (227.9/sq mi)
- Time zone: UTC+0 (GMT)

Kébémer department is one of the 46 departments of Senegal, and one of the three which make up the Louga region.

The only commune in the department is Kébémer.

The rural districts (communautés rurales) comprise:

- Arrondissement of Ndande:
  - Bandegne Ouolof
  - Diokoul Diawrigne
  - Kab Gaye
  - Ndande
  - Thieppe
- Arrondissement of Darou Mousty:
  - Mbacké Cajor
  - Darou Marnane
  - Darou Mousty
  - Mbadiane
  - Ndoyene
  - Sam Yabal
  - Touba Mérina
- Arrondissement of Sagatta Gueth:
  - Ngourane Ouolof
  - Thiolom Fall
  - Sagatta Gueth
  - Kanène Ndiob
  - Loro

== Historic sites ==
- Ndande railway station
- Wells of Kalom at Ndande
- Tomb of Kocc Barma Fall at Ndiongué Fall, Ndande district
- Dékheulé battlefield
- Loro battlefield
- Kébémer quay
