= Louga department =

Coordinates: 15°37′00″N 16°13′00″W

Louga
- Department
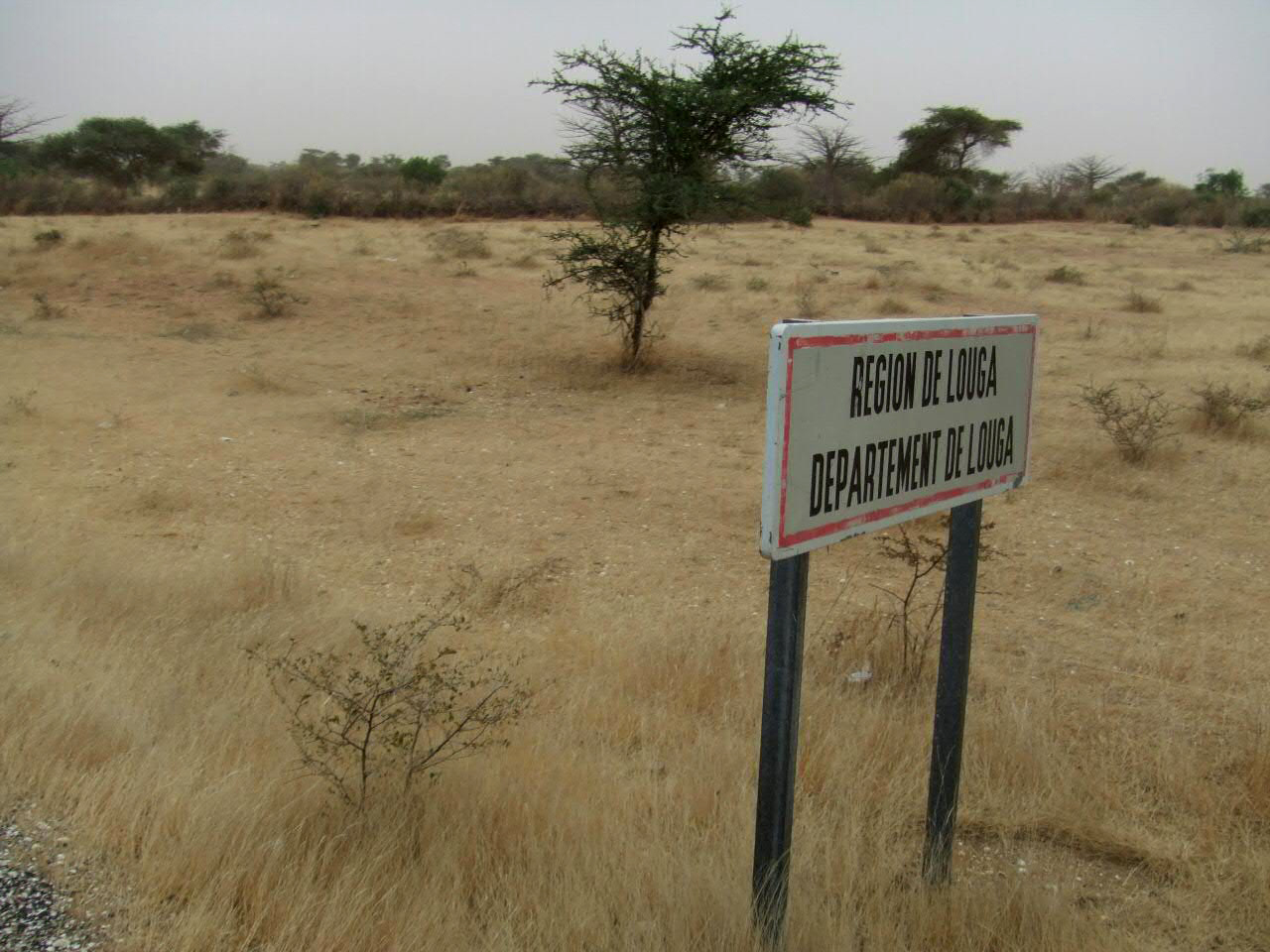

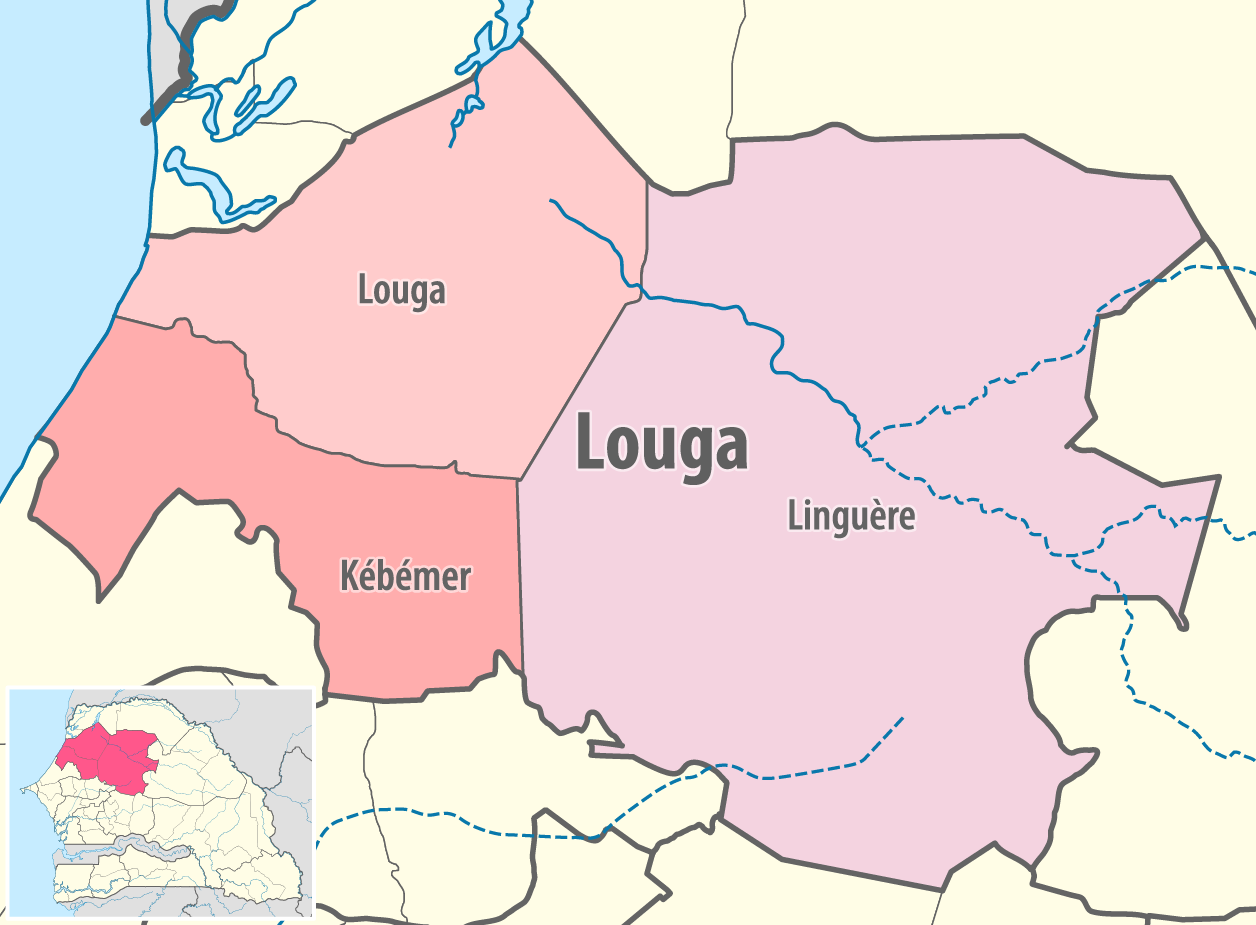
- Location in the Louga region
- Country: Senegal
- Region: Louga region
- Capital: Louga

Area
  - Total: 5,649 km^{2} (2,181 sq mi)

Population (2023 census)
  - Total: 477,887
  - Density: 84.60/km^{2} (219.1/sq mi)
- Time zone: UTC+0 (GMT)

Louga department is one of the 46 departments of Senegal, and one of the three which comprise the Louga region.

The chief settlement is Louga, the only commune in the department.

The rural districts (communautés rurales) comprise:

- Arrondissement of Coki:
  - Coki
  - Ndiagne
  - Thiamène Cayor
  - Pété Ouarack
  - Guet Ardo
- Arrondissement of Keur Momar Sarr:
  - Keur Momar Sarr
  - Nguer Malal
  - Syer
  - Gande
- Arrondissement of Mbédiène:
  - Mbédiène
  - Niomré
  - Nguidilé
  - Kéle Gueye
- Arrondissement of Sakal:
  - Léona
  - Ngueune Sarr
  - Sakal

== Historic sites ==
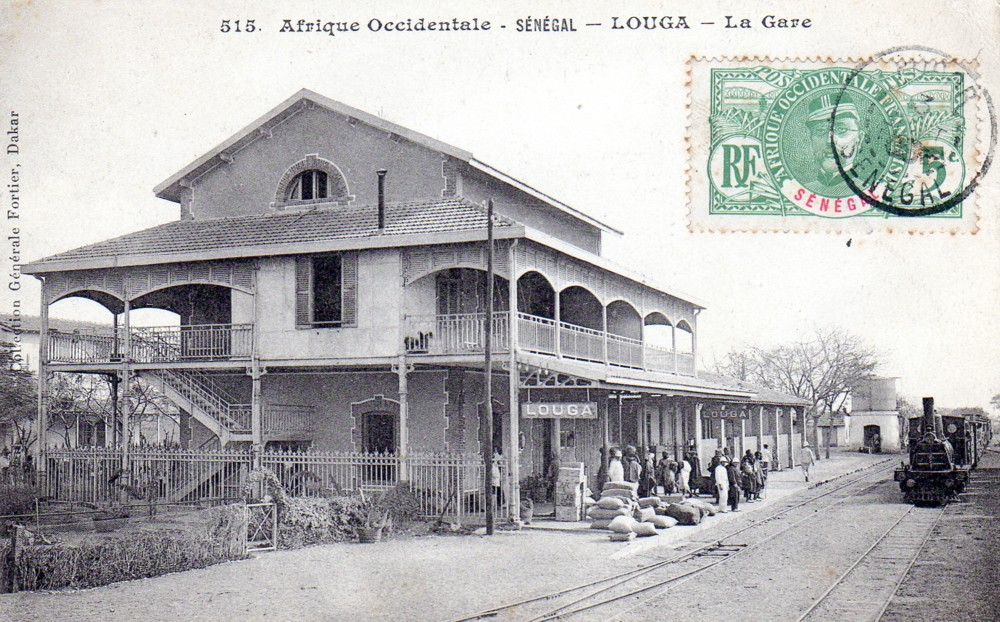
Louga Railway Station

- Old Artillery Barracks, commune of Louga
- Louga Post
- Louga Railway Station
- Kadd Gui acacia tree, opposite Louga railway station
- Historic site of " Toundou Diéwol "
- Daara of Coki at Cooki
