= Rural communities of Senegal =

Fourth-level administrative divisions in Senegal

Rural communities (Communautés rurales) (CR) were fourth-level administrative divisions in Senegal. They were administrative subdivisions comprising the villages, but distinct from the urban communes and municipalities concerning medium or large towns.

Senegal is a predominantly agricultural country, and the rural communities by far encompassed the largest part of the national territory.

== Law ==
The rural communities were imposed by the law No. 72.25 on 19 April 1972. Until early 2008, there were about 324 rural communities but in August 2008 the number has increased and there are now about 340.

In 2013 Senegal passed Act III of Decentralization, which abolished rural communities, and transformed all rural, urban and arrodissements communes into simply communes.

== Dakar Region ==
- Bambylor
- Tivaouane Peulh-Niaga
- Yène

== Diourbel Region ==
=== Bambey Department ===
- Baba Garage
- Dinguiraye
- Gawane
- Keur Samba Kane
- Lambaye
- Ndangalma
- Ndondol
- Ngoye
- Ngogom
- Réfane
- Thiakhar

=== Diourbel Department ===
- Gade Escale
- Keur Ngalgou
- Dankh Sène
- Ndindy
- Ndoulo
- Ngohé
- Patar
- Taïba Moutoupha
- Tocky-Gare
- Touba Lappé
- Touré Mbonde

=== Mbacké Department ===
- Dalla Ngabou
- Darou Nahim
- Darou Salam Typ
- Dendey Gouyegui
- Kael
- Madina
- Missirah
- Ndioumane
- Nghaye
- Sadio
- Taïba Thiékène
- Taïf
- Touba Fall
- Touba Mboul
- Touba Mosquée

== Fatick Region ==
=== Fatick Department ===
- Diaoulé
- Diarrère
- Diouroup
- Djilasse
- Fimela
- Loul Séssène
- Mbéllacadiao
- Ndiob
- Ngayokhème
- Niakhar
- Palmarin
- Patar
- Tattaguine
- Thiaré Ndialgui

=== Foundiougne Department ===
- Bassoul
- Diagane Barka
- Dionewar
- Diossong
- Djilor
- Djirnda
- Keur Saloum Diané
- Keur Samba Guèye
- Mbam
- Niassène
- Nioro Alassane Tall
- Toubacouta

=== Gossas Department ===
- Colobane
- Mbar
- Ndiène Lagane
- Ouadiour
- Patar Lia

== Kaffrine Region ==
=== Birkelane Department ===
- Diamal
- Keur Mboucki
- Mabo
- Mbeuleup
- Ndiognick
- Ségré Gatta
- Touba Mbella

=== Kaffrine Department ===
- Boulel
- Diamagadio
- Diokoul Mbelbouck
- Gniby
- Kahi
- Kathiotte
- Médinatoul Salam II

=== Koungheul Department ===
- Fass Thiékène
- Ida Mouride
- Lour Escale
- Maka Yop
- Missirah Wadène
- Gainte Pathé
- Ribot Escale
- Saly Escale

=== Malem Hodar Department ===
- Darou Minam 2
- Dianké Souf
- Khelcom
- Ndiobène Samba Lamo
- Ndioum Ngainthe
- Sagna

== Kaolack Region ==
=== Guinguinéo Department ===
- Dara Mboss
- Gagnick
- Khelcom Birane
- Mbadakhoune
- Ndiago
- Ngathe Naoudé
- Nguélou
- Ourour
- Panal Wolof

=== Kaolack Department ===
- Dya
- Keur Baka
- Latmingué
- Ndiaffate
- Ndiébel
- Ndiédieng
- Thiaré
- Thiomby

=== Nioro du Rip Department ===
- Dabaly
- Darou Salam
- Gainthe Kaye
- Kayemor
- Keur Maba Diakhou
- Keur Madongo
- Keur Socé
- Médina Sabakh
- Ndramé Escale
- Ngayène
- Paoskoto
- Porokhane
- Taïba Niassène
- Wack Ngouna

== Kédougou Region ==
=== Kédougou Department ===
- Bandafassi
- Dimboli
- Dindefelo
- Fongolimbi
- Ninéfécha
- Tomboroncoto

=== Salémata Department ===
- Dar Salam
- Ethiolo
- Oubadji

=== Saraya Department ===
- Bembou
- Dakateli
- Kévoye
- Khossanto
- Médina Baffé
- Missirah Sirimana
- Sabodala

== Kolda Region ==
=== Kolda Department ===
- Bagadadji
- Coumbacara
- Dialambéré
- Dioulacolon
- Guiro Yéro Bocar
- Mampatim
- Médina Chérif
- Médina El Hadj
- Saré Bidji
- Tankanto Escale
- Thiétty

=== Médina Yoro Foulah Department ===
- Bignarabé
- Bourouco
- Dinguiraye
- Kéréwane
- Koulinto
- Ndorna
- Niaming

=== Vélingara Department ===
- Badion
- Bonconto
- Fafacourou
- Kandia
- Kandiaye
- Linkéring
- Médina Gounass
- Némataba
- Ouassadou
- Pakour
- Paroumba
- Saré Coly Sallé
- Sinthiang Koundara

== Louga Region ==
=== Kébémer Department ===
- Bandegne Ouolof
- Darou Marnane
- Darou Mousty
- Diokoul Diawrigne
- Kab Gaye
- Kanène Ndiob
- Loro
- Mbacké Cajor
- Mbadiane
- Ndande
- Ndoyene
- Ngourane Ouolof
- Sagatta Gueth
- Sam Yabal
- Thieppe
- Thiolom Fall
- Touba Mérina

=== Linguère Department ===
- Affé Djoloff
- Barkédji
- Boulal
- Dealy
- Dodji
- Gassane
- Kamb
- Labgar
- Mboula
- Ouarkhokh
- Sagatta Djolof
- Téssékéré Forage
- Thiamène Djolof
- Thiarny
- Thiel
- Yang-Yang

=== Louga Department ===
- Coki
- Gande
- Guet Ardo
- Kéle Gueye
- Keur Momar Sarr
- Léona
- Mbédiène
- Nguer Malal
- Ngueune Sarr
- Nguidilé
- Niomré
- Pété Ouarack
- Sakal
- Syer
- Thiamène Cayor

== Matam Region ==
=== Kanel Department ===
- Aouré
- Bokiladji
- Ndendory
- Orkadiere
- Wouro Sidy

=== Matam Department ===
- Agnams
- Bokidiawé
- Dabia
- Nabadji Civol
- Ogo
- Oréfondé

=== Ranérou Ferlo Department ===
- Lougré Thioly
- Oudalaye
- Vélingara

== Saint-Louis Region ==
=== Dagana Department ===
- Bokhol
- Diama
- Mbane
- Ngnith
- Ronkh

=== Podor Department ===
- Boké Dialloubé
- Dodel
- Doumga Lao
- Fanaye
- Gamadji Saré
- Guédé Village
- Madina Diathbé
- Mbolo Birane
- Mery
- Ndiayène Peindao

=== Saint-Louis Department ===
- Fass Ngom
- Gandon
- Ndiébène Gandiole

== Sédhiou Region ==
=== Bounkiling Department ===
- Bona
- Diacounda
- Diambati
- Diaroumé
- Djinany
- Faoune
- Inor
- Kandion Mangana
- Ndiamalathiel
- Tankon

=== Goudomp Department ===
- Baghère
- Diouboudou
- Djibanar
- Kaour
- Karantaba
- Kolibantang
- Mangaroungou Santo
- Niagha
- Simbandi Balante
- Simbandi Brassou
- Yarang Balante

=== Sédhiou Department ===
- Bambaly
- Bémet Bidjini
- Boghall
- Diannah Ba
- Diendé
- Djibabouya
- Djiredji
- Koussy
- Oudoucar
- Sakar
- Sama Kanta Peulh
- Sansamba

== Tambacounda Region ==
=== Bakel Department ===
- Ballou
- Bélé
- Gabou
- Gathiary

=== Goudiry Department ===
- Bani Israël
- Boutoucoufara
- Boynguel Bamba
- Dianké Makha
- Dougué
- Goumbayél
- Koar
- Komoti
- Koulor
- Koussan

=== Koumpentoum Department ===
- Bamba Thialène
- Kahène
- Kouthiaba Wolof

=== Tambacounda Department ===
- Bala
- Dialacoto
- Koussanar

== Thiès Region ==
=== M'bour Department ===
- Diass
- Fissel
- Malicounda
- Ndiaganiao
- Nguéniène
- Séssène
- Sindia

=== Thiès Department ===
- Diender
- Fandène
- Keur Moussa
- Ndiéyène Sirah
- Ngoudiane
- Notto
- Tassette
- Thiénaba
- Touba Toul
- Yaboyabo

=== Tivaouane Department ===
- Darou Khoudoss
- Koul
- Mbayène
- Méouane
- Mérina Dakhar
- Mont Rolland
- Ngandiouf
- Niakhène
- Notto Gouye Diama
- Pékèsse
- Taïba Ndiaye
- Thilmakha

== Ziguinchor Region ==
=== Bignona Department ===
- Balinghor
- Diégoune
- Kartiack
- Mangagoulack
- Mlomp

=== Oussouye Department ===
- Diembéring
- Mlomp
- Oukout
- Santhiaba Manjacque

=== Ziguinchor Department ===
- Niaguis
- Nyassia
