= Cherif Al-Hassane Aidara =

Mauritanian-Senegalese Sufi religious leader

- Born: 1917; Timbédra, Mauritania
- Died: December 2011 (aged 93–94); Darou Hidjiratou, Senegal
- Occupation: Shi'i religious leader
- Spouse: Maimouna Diao
- Children: Cherif Mohamed Aly Aidara, Cherif Habib Aidara

Cherif Al-Hassane Aidara (born 1917 in Timbédra, Mauritania; died December 2011 in Darou Hidjiratou, Senegal) was a Mauritanian-Senegalese Sufi religious leader belonging to the Tijaniya tariqa.

== Biography ==
Cherif Al-Hassane Aidara emigrated from Mauritania to Senegal in the late 1930s. Upon his arrival in Senegal, he was welcomed by Thierno Siirajaddine Mohamed Said Ba of Medina Gounass and its cantonal chief Seydou Diao. Eventually, he married the cantonal chief's daughter Maimouna Diao.

He lived in his village of Darou Hidjiratou and was buried there in December 2011.

The Grand Al Hassanayni Mosque (meaning: the "Two Hassans" Mosque) of Darou Hidjiratou was built by the Mozdahir International Institute (IMI) and its president Cherif Mohamed Aly Aidara. The mosque was named in honor of Cherif Al-Hassane Aidara and his ancestor Imam Al Hassane Al Mojtaba ibn Ali, grandson of the Prophet Muhammad and the second of the Twelve Imams in Twelver Shiism.

== Family ==
Cherif Al-Hassane Aidara is the father of Cherif Mohamed Aly Aidara, a Shi'a religious leader and founder of the NGO Institut Mozdahir International (IMI). Cherif Al-Hassane Aidara is also the father of Cherif Habib Aidara, mayor of Bonconto Commune.

== See also ==
- Shia Islam in Senegal
- Mozdahir
- Darou Hidjiratou
