= Diattacounda Arrondissement =

- Arrondissement
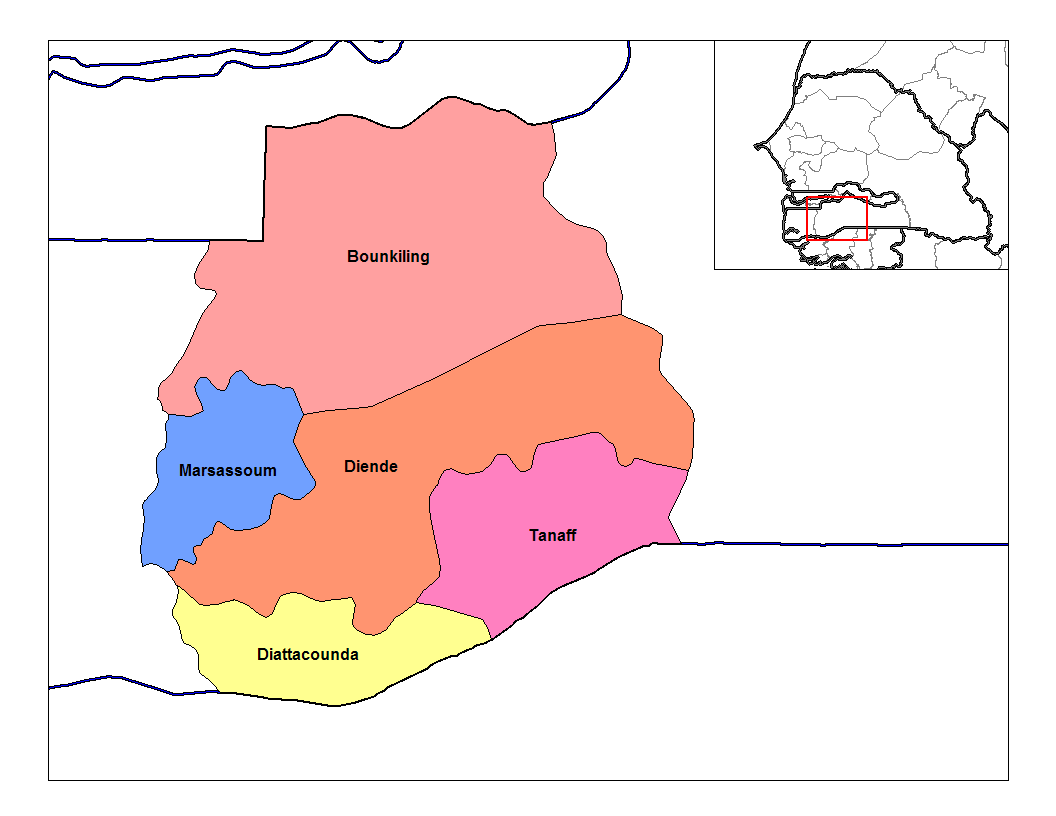
- Location in the Sédhiou Department
- Country: Senegal
- Region: Sédhiou Region
- Department: Sédhiou Department
- Time zone: UTC±00:00 (GMT)

Diattacounda Arrondissement is an arrondissement of the Sédhiou Department in the Sédhiou Region of Senegal.

== Subdivisions ==
The arrondissement is divided administratively into rural communities and in turn into villages.
