= Sinthiang Koundara =

Sinthiang Koundara Sinthiang Coundara
- Rural community
- Interactive map of Sinthiang Koundara
- Country: Senegal
- Region: Kolda Region
- Department: Vélingara Department
- Arrondissement: Bonconto
- Time zone: UTC+0 (GMT)

Sinthiang Koundara (or Sinthiang Coundara) is a rural community of Bonconto Arrondissement in the Vélingara Department, Kolda Region, Senegal.

Sinthiang Koundara commune includes the village of Nadjaf Al Ashraf, a village founded by Shi'i religious leader Cherif Mohamed Aly Aidara.

== Notable people ==
- Cherif Mohamed Aly Aidara, founder of the international NGO Mozdahir
