= Bonconto Arrondissement =

Arrondissement in Kolda Region, Senegal

Bonconto Arrondissement Bonkonto Arrondissement
- Arrondissement
- Interactive map of Bonconto Arrondissement
- Country: Senegal
- Region: Kolda Region
- Department: Vélingara Department
- Time zone: UTC±00:00 (GMT)

Bonconto Arrondissement is an arrondissement of the Vélingara Department in the Kolda Region of Senegal. It is also spelled Bonkonto.

== Subdivisions ==
The arrondissement is divided administratively into rural communities and in turn into villages. The communes or rural communities (French: communauté rurale) are:

- Bonconto (commune)
- Linkéring
- Médina Gounass
- Sinthiang Koundara

== Attractions ==
- The Al Hassanayni Grand Mosque of Darou Hidjiratou is the largest mosque in Bonconto Arrondissement. It is one of the primary mosques for Shi'i Muslims in Senegal.

== Notable people ==
Notable people:

- Cherif Mohamed Aly Aidara, founder of the international NGO Mozdahir
