= Kounkane Arrondissement =

- Arrondissement
- Interactive map of Kounkane Arrondissement
- Country: Senegal
- Region: Kolda Region
- Department: Vélingara Department
- Time zone: UTC±00:00 (GMT)

Kounkane Arrondissement is an arrondissement of the Vélingara Department in the Kolda Region of Senegal.

== Subdivisions ==
The arrondissement is divided administratively into rural communities and in turn into villages.
