= Nadjaf Al Ashraf =

Village in Kolda, Senegal

Nadjaf Al Ashraf Nadjaf Al Achraf
- Village
- Location in Senegal
- Country: Senegal
- Region: Kolda
- Department: Vélingara
- Arrondissement: Bonconto
- Commune: Sinthiang Koundara
- Time zone: UTC+0 (GMT)

Nadjaf Al Ashraf (also spelled Nadjaf Al Achraf or Najaf Al Ashraf) is a village in Sinthiang Koundara commune, Bonconto Arrondissement, Vélingara Department, Senegal. It is located on the banks of the Koulountou River, a tributary of the Gambia River.

The village was named after the holy Shi'a city of Najaf (full name: Al-Najaf al-Ashraf; Arabic: ٱلنَّجَف ٱلْأَشْرَف) in southern Iraq. It was founded by local Shi'i religious leader Cherif Mohamed Aly Aidara.

== History ==
Cherif Mohamed Aly Aidara, founder of the NGO Mozdahir International Institute, founded the village as a social development project for poverty alleviation and sustainable development. 400 impoverished families were moved to the area to help curb the flow of domestic migration to cities as well as international migration, and a banana plantation was opened there.

Today, there are hundreds of hectares of banana plantations in Nadjaf Al Ashraf. Mozdahir manages the plantations and ensures that the farmers can earn living wages.

== See also ==
- Darou Hidjiratou
- Fair trade
