= Bonconto =

Bonconto (Bonkonto) refers to different administrative divisions of Senegal.

- Bonconto Arrondissement
- Bonconto (commune)
