= Nemataba =

Némataba
- City and commune
- Location within Senegal
- Coordinates: 13°13′42″N 14°04′09″W
- Country: Senegal
- Region: Kolda Region
- Department: Vélingara
- Arrondissement: Saré Coly Sallé
- Time zone: UTC+0 (GMT)

Nemataba is a village and commune in the department of Vélingara, in the Kolda region of Senegal. According to oral history, Tiramakhan Traore, founder of Kaabu, also founded Nemataba, where he built three fortresses and stayed for three years.
