= Darou Hidjiratou =

Village and Zone in Kolda, Senegal

Coordinates: 13°02′N 13°52′W

Darou Hidjiratou Darou Hijratou
- Village and Zone
- Location in Senegal
- Country: Senegal
- Region: Kolda
- Department: Vélingara
- Arrondissement: Bonconto
- Commune: Bonconto

Government
  - Mayor: Cherif Habib Aidara

Population (2010)
  - Total: 1,580
- Time zone: UTC+0 (GMT)

Darou Hidjiratou (also spelled Darou Hijratou or Darou Idjiratou) is a village and zone in Bonconto Commune, Bonconto Arrondissement, Vélingara Department of Kolda Region in south Senegal. As a major center of Shia Islam in Senegal, it is home to the Al Hassanayni Grand Mosque of Darou Hidjiratou, the largest mosque in Bonconto Arrondissement.

Darou Hijiratou Zone is made up of 8 villages: Darou Hijiratou (Darou Idjiratou), Amanatoulaye, Fass, Afia, Pakinia Sinthiang, Pakinia Paoundé, Hamdalaye Kouta, Moundou Sankoulé. Darou Hijiratou village has approximately 1,580 persons (year 2010).

== Notable people ==
The village is locally well known as the birthplace of a prominent Shi'i Muslim family in Senegal, including Bonconto Commune leader Cherif Habib Aidara and his brother Cherif Mohamed Aly Aidara, founder of the international NGO Mozdahir.

The village was named Darou Hidjiratou (Dar El Hijra, 'the house of immigration') by Cherif Al-Hassane Aidara, the father of Cherif Mohamed Aly Aidara.

== Pilgrimage site ==
Cherif Al-Hassane Aidara, the founder of the village, is buried in Darou Hidjiratou. Every year, thousands of people visit his tomb for prayers.

== See also ==
- Nadjaf Al Ashraf (Senegal)
