= Kolda =

Kolda كولدا
- City and commune
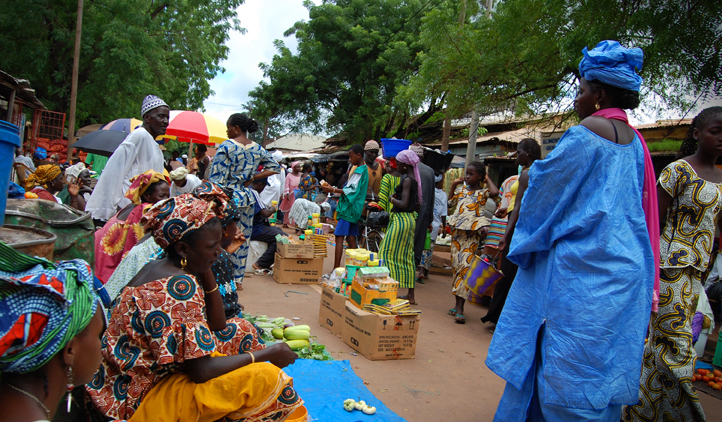
- Kolda town centre market

- Location within Senegal
- Coordinates: 12°53′N 14°57′W
- Country: Senegal
- Region: Kolda
- Department: Kolda

Government
  - Mayor: Mame Boye Diao

Area
  - City and commune: 39.24 km^{2} (15.15 sq mi)
- Elevation: 34 m (112 ft)

Population (2023 census)
  - City and commune: 103,574
  - Density: 2,640/km^{2} (6,836/sq mi)
- Time zone: UTC+0 (GMT)

Kolda (Arabic: كولدا; Wolof: Koldaa) is a city and urban commune located in southern Senegal. It is the capital city of Kolda Region and Kolda Department, a region known historically and popularly as Haute Casamance.

== History ==
The name Kolda derives from the name of the city's founder Koly Dado who first established a settlement near the banks of the Casamance River.

== Administration ==
Kolda is the chief city of Kolda Department and of the Kolda Region.

== Geography ==
The city is located on National Road 6, also called the "southern route" due to the fact that it goes from Dakar to Ziguinchor through Tambacounda, Vélingara and Kolda. Dakar, the capital city of Sénégal, is located 670 kilometers from Kolda.

Local administrative districts include Bantanguel, Doumassou, Ndiobène, Sarè Moussa, Gadapara, Sarè Kemo, Sinthiang Tountouroung, Sinthiang Idriss, Escale, Sikilo, and Faraba. Kolda is the main capital of the region incorporating the two departments of Velingara and Fafacourou.

=== Climate ===
Kolda has a tropical savanna climate (Köppen Aw) with two distinct seasons. The wet season lasts for five months, from June through October, while the dry season begins in November and ends in May.

Temperatures are hot to sweltering throughout the year. The annual average temperature is 28.7 °C or 83.7 °F, with a maximum of 32.5 °C or 90.5 °F in May and a minimum of 24.8 °C or 76.6 °F in December. Afternoons in the latter half of the dry season are extremely hot, averaging over 40 °C or 104 °F from March to May. However, in the middle of the dry season mornings are distinctly comfortable at around 15 °C or 59 °F.

Climate data for Kolda (1991–2020)
Month	Jan	Feb	Mar	Apr	May	Jun	Jul	Aug	Sep	Oct	Nov	Dec	Year
Mean daily maximum °C (°F)	35.5 (95.9)	38.0 (100.4)	40.4 (104.7)	41.5 (106.7)	40.8 (105.4)	37.2 (99.0)	33.4 (92.1)	32.3 (90.1)	32.9 (91.2)	34.5 (94.1)	35.7 (96.3)	35.0 (95.0)	36.4 (97.5)
Mean daily minimum °C (°F)	14.5 (58.1)	17.1 (62.8)	20.2 (68.4)	22.5 (72.5)	24.2 (75.6)	24.8 (76.6)	24.0 (75.2)	23.6 (74.5)	23.2 (73.8)	23.2 (73.8)	18.8 (65.8)	14.6 (58.3)	20.9 (69.6)
Average rainfall mm (inches)	0.1 (0.00)	0.1 (0.00)	0.0 (0.0)	0.1 (0.00)	19.0 (0.75)	121.5 (4.78)	248.9 (9.80)	318.4 (12.54)	265.4 (10.45)	81.7 (3.22)	2.6 (0.10)	0.0 (0.0)	1,057.8 (41.65)
Average rainy days (≥ 1.0 mm)	0.0	0.0	0.0	0.0	1.3	7.4	14.2	16.9	16.0	6.1	0.3	0.0	62.2
Mean monthly sunshine hours	254.2	246.4	269.7	270.0	275.9	237.0	210.8	192.2	210.0	238.7	246.0	235.6	2,886.5
Mean daily sunshine hours	8.2	8.8	8.7	9.0	8.9	7.9	6.8	6.2	7.0	7.7	8.2	7.6	7.9
Source: NOAA (sun 1961-1990)

== Demographics ==
As of 2002, Kolda's population was 53,921. In 2007, official estimations, numbered the population at 62,258 inhabitants. The majority population is members of the Fula ethnic group. Mandinke and Jola ethnic groups are also present.

== Economy ==
A Center of Zootechniques Research (CRZ) was established in Kolda in 1972. Major crops include cotton, cereals like miley, fonio, peanut and another vegetables. Kolda also has major sheep, cattle, and dairy production. Kolda is abundant in fruits such as mangoes, oranges, and acajou nuts.

== Notable people ==
- Tapa Diao, cultural and political leader, former senator of Kolda in the National Assembly
- Cherif Mohamed Aly Aidara, Islamic religious leader and founder of international NGO Mozdahir (born in Darou Hidjiratou)
- Sidney Toure, poet, actor, activist
- Moriba Pascal Doumbia, educator
- El Hadj Omar Fall, educator
- Mère Henry Ronk (Catholic Mission), caregiver
- Ablaye Diallo (Zal), footballer
- Massamba Sambou, football player
- Souleymane Diamanka, poet
- Ablaye Cissoko, Singer, Musician
- General Ameth Fall
- Sada Kane, journalist
- Barou Balde, Adjunct Mayor
- Bécaye Diop, Minister of State, Minister of the Armed Forces, and Mayor of Kolda
- Cheikh Sabaly, Footballer
