= Pakour =

- Town and commune
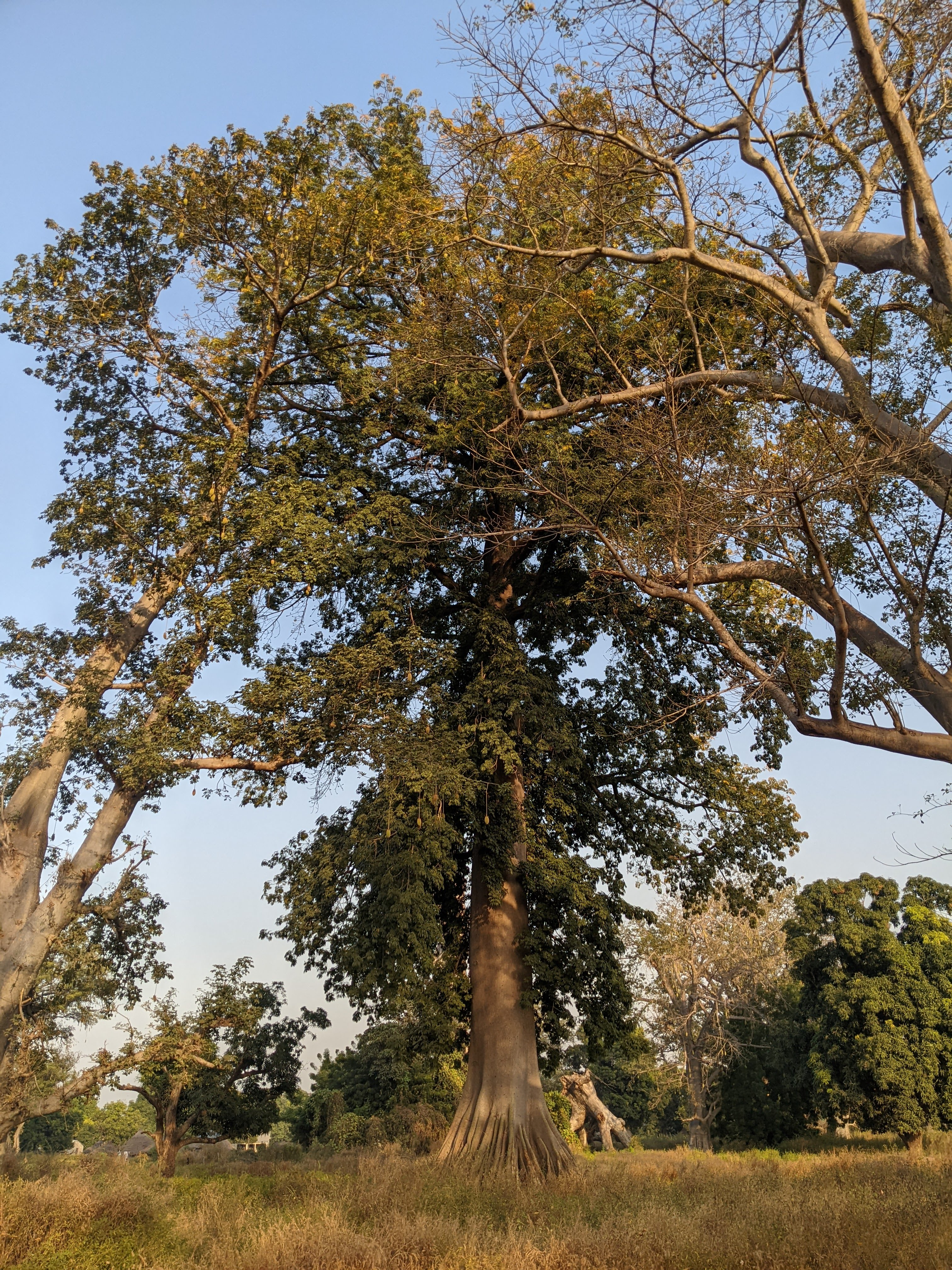
- A bantango tree in Pakour

- Location in Senegal
- Coordinates: 12.761°N 13.96°W
- Country: Senegal
- Region: Kolda Region
- Department: Velingara
- Arrondissement: Pakour

Area
  - Town and commune: 337.8 km^{2} (130.4 sq mi)

Population (2023 census)
  - Town and commune: 16,237
  - Density: 48.07/km^{2} (124.5/sq mi)
- Time zone: UTC+0 (GMT)

Pakour is a town and commune located in the Kolda Region of Senegal.
