= Bonconto (commune) =

Rural community in Kolda Region, Senegal

Bonconto Commune Bonkonto Commune
- Rural community
- Location in Senegal
- Country: Senegal
- Region: Kolda Region
- Department: Vélingara Department
- Arrondissement: Bonconto
- Time zone: UTC±00:00 (GMT)

Bonconto Commune is a rural community of Bonconto Arrondissement in the Vélingara Department, Kolda Region, Senegal. It is also spelled Bonkonto. The commune is known as a major center of Shia Islam in Senegal and is home to the Al Hassanayni Grand Mosque of Darou Hidjiratou, the largest mosque in the commune.

Darou Hidjiratou is significant as the birthplace of a prominent Shi'i Muslim family in Senegal, which includes the village leader Cherif Habib Aidara (Chérif Habibou Aïdara) and his brother Cherif Mohamed Aly Aidara, founder of the international NGO Mozdahir.

== Demographics ==
Demographics of Bonconto Rural Community:

- 9,688 persons (year 2010)
- 5,416 (year 1988)

9 ethnic groups were counted in 2010, with Fulani making up most of the population.

- Peul (Fulani) (73%)
- Manding (8%)
- Bassari (6%)
- Bambara (4%)
- Remaining ethnic groups: Koniagui, Diola, Mandiack, Diankhanké, Koroboro

== Zones and villages ==
Zones and villages in Bonconto Commune:

Zone	Village center	Population (2010)	Number of villages	Villages
Bonconto	Bonconto	2,670	11	Bonconto, Bonconto Fouta, Darou Salam Djidéré, Téyel Pakane, Diyabougou, Fodé, Mandounka Kaly, Kéréwane Pakane, Koundara Kaba, Mounting Hamady, Nétéré Pakane, Kaél Béssel
Bantancountou	Bantancountou	1,197	5	Bantancountou, Darou Salam Sedou, Thiancoung, Kodionté, Sahatou
Saré Bossédie	Saré Bossédie	448	5	Saré Bossédie, Mampatéyel, Pakane, Bandiangara, Patim Couta Pakane
Darou Hidjiratou	Darou Hidjiratou	2,925	8	Darou Hidjiratou (Darou Idjiratou), Amanatoulaye, Fass, Afia, Pakinia Sinthiang, Pakinia Maoundé, Hamdalaye Koula, Moundou Sankoulé
Thiomolock	Thiomolock	1,076	6	Thiomolock Tombong, Thiomolock Diam, Saré Yéro Bouly, Sinthiang Baïlo, Hamdallye Barka, Sinthiang Guélladio

== Notable people ==
Darou Hidjiratou is significant as the birthplace of a prominent Shi'i Muslim family in Senegal, including:

- Chérif Habibou Aïdara, the local mayor
- Cherif Mohamed Aly Aidara, founder of the international NGO Mozdahir (brother of Chérif Habibou Aïdara)
