= Médina Gounass =

- Rural community
- Location within Senegal
- Coordinates: 13°8′19.9896″N 13°45′36.4932″W
- Country: Senegal
- Region: Kolda Region
- Department: Vélingara Department
- Arrondissement: Bonconto
- Time zone: UTC+0 (GMT)

Médina Gounass is a rural community of Bonconto Arrondissement in the Vélingara Department, Kolda Region, Senegal.

== Notable people ==
Notable people:

- Cherif Mohamed Aly Aidara, founder of the international NGO Mozdahir

== Climate ==
Médina Gounass has a tropical savanna climate (Aw) with no rainfall from November to May and heavy rainfall from June to October.

Climate data for Médina Gounass
Month	Jan	Feb	Mar	Apr	May	Jun	Jul	Aug	Sep	Oct	Nov	Dec	Year
Mean daily maximum °C (°F)	32.2 (90.0)	35.3 (95.5)	37.6 (99.7)	38.7 (101.7)	38.6 (101.5)	34.7 (94.5)	31.7 (89.1)	30.6 (87.1)	31.4 (88.5)	33.2 (91.8)	34.0 (93.2)	32.4 (90.3)	34.2 (93.6)
Daily mean °C (°F)	23.1 (73.6)	26.1 (79.0)	29.0 (84.2)	30.8 (87.4)	31.6 (88.9)	29.2 (84.6)	27.3 (81.1)	26.4 (79.5)	26.7 (80.1)	27.5 (81.5)	26.0 (78.8)	23.5 (74.3)	27.3 (81.1)
Mean daily minimum °C (°F)	14.0 (57.2)	17.0 (62.6)	20.4 (68.7)	22.9 (73.2)	24.6 (76.3)	23.8 (74.8)	22.9 (73.2)	22.3 (72.1)	22.1 (71.8)	21.9 (71.4)	18.1 (64.6)	14.7 (58.5)	20.4 (68.7)
Average rainfall mm (inches)	0 (0)	1 (0.0)	0 (0)	3 (0.1)	23 (0.9)	122 (4.8)	200 (7.9)	282 (11.1)	238 (9.4)	81 (3.2)	5 (0.2)	0 (0)	955 (37.6)
Source: Climate-Data.org
