= Goudomp department =

Coordinates: 12°34′40″N 15°52′20″W

Goudomp
- Department
- Interactive map of Goudomp
- Country: Senegal
- Region: Sédhiou region
- Capital: Goudomp

Population (2023 census)
  - Total: 188,537
- Time zone: UTC±00:00 (GMT)

Goudomp department is one of the 46 departments of Senegal, one of three making up the Sédhiou region. It was created in 2008 along with the Sédhiou region, which was formerly part of the Kolda region.

There are four communes in the department: Goudomp, Samine, Tanaff and Diattacounda.

The rural districts (communautés rurales) comprise:

- Arrondissement of Djibanar:
  - Yarang Balante
  - Mangaroungou Santo
  - Simbandi Balante
  - Djibanar
  - Kaour
- Arrondissement of Simbandi Brassou:
  - Diouboudou
  - Simbandi Brassou
  - Baghère
  - Niagha
- Arrondissement of Karantaba:
  - Karantaba
  - Kolibantang

== Historic sites ==
- Mosque of Karantaba
- Mosque of Baghère
