= Médina Yoro Foulah =

- Town and commune
- Location in Senegal
- Coordinates: 13°8′N 14°43′W
- Country: Senegal
- Region: Kolda
- Department: Médina Yoro Foulah

Area
  - Town and commune: 2.129 km^{2} (0.822 sq mi)

Population (2023 census)
  - Town and commune: 4,936
  - Density: 2,318/km^{2} (6,005/sq mi)
- Time zone: UTC+0 (GMT)

Médina Yoro Foulah is a small town with commune status in south Senegal. It is the chief settlement of Médina Yoro Foulah Department in Kolda Region, close to the border with Gambia in Haute Casamance.

In 2013 its population was recorded at 3,000.
