= Goudomp =

- Town and commune
- Location within Senegal
- Coordinates: 12°34′40″N 15°52′20″W
- Country: Senegal
- Region: Sédhiou Region
- Department: Goudomp Department

Area
  - Town and commune: 10.52 km^{2} (4.06 sq mi)

Population (2023 census)
  - Town and commune: 15,993
  - Density: 1,520/km^{2} (3,937/sq mi)
- Time zone: UTC+0 (GMT)

Goudomp is a town and urban commune in the Sédhiou Region of Senegal. It is the capital of the Goudomp Department. The population in 2023 was 15,993, an increase from the 12,870 counted in 2013.

The current mayor is Abdoulaye Bosco Sadio. The town received commune status in 1996.
