= Fatou Diome =

French-Senegalese writer (born 1968)

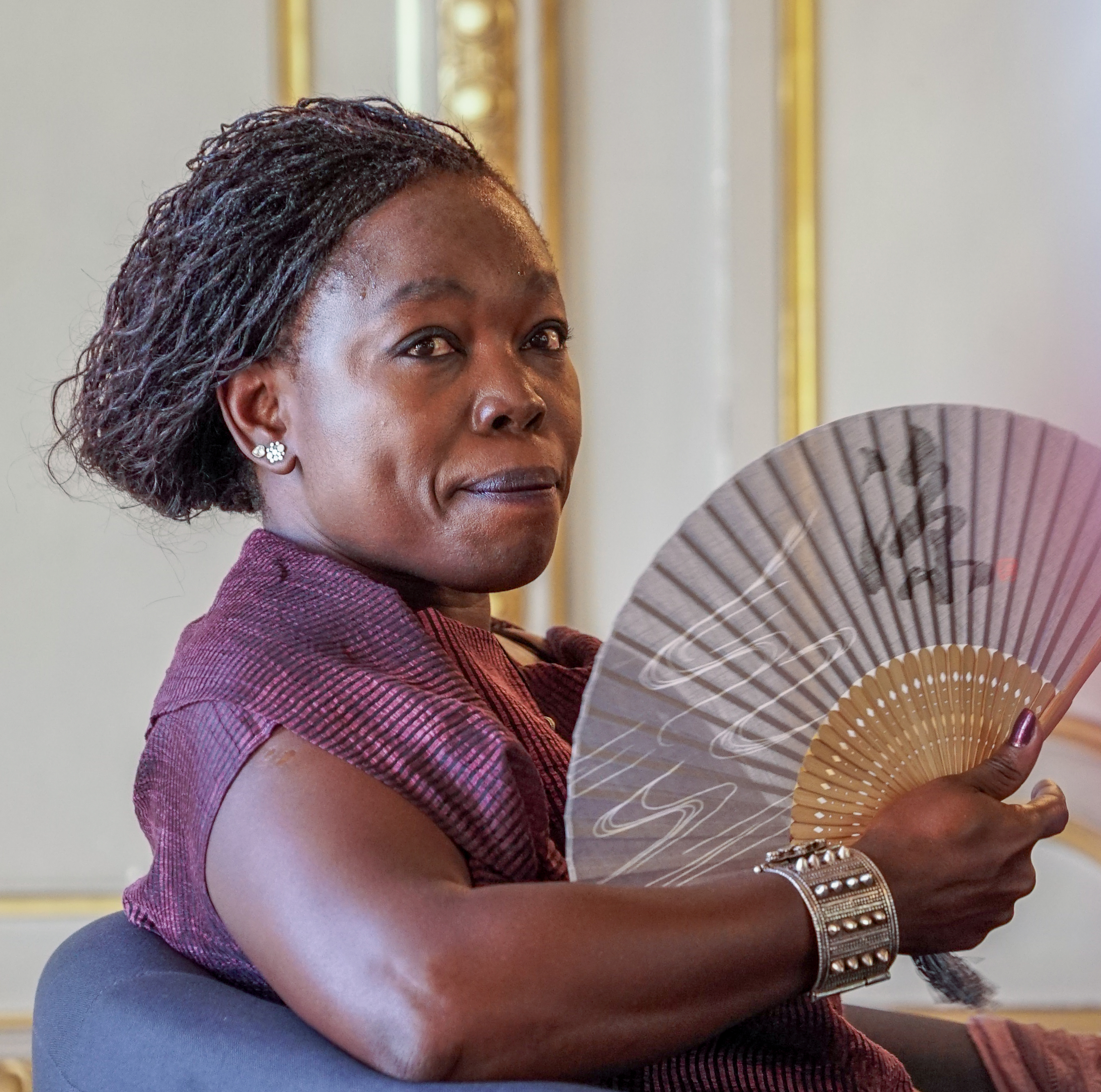
- Diome in 2019
- Born: 1968 (age 57–58); Niodior, Senegal
- Citizenship: Senegal; France
- Education: Cheikh Anta Diop University; University of Strasbourg
- Occupations: Novelist; short story writer; essayist
- Writing career
- Period: 2001–present
- Genre: Literary fiction
- Notable work: The Belly of the Atlantic

Fatou Diome (born 1968) is a French-Senegalese writer known for her best-selling novel The Belly of the Atlantic, which was published in 2003. Her work explores immigrant life in France, and the relationship between France and Africa. Fatou Diome lives in Strasbourg, France.

== Biography ==
Fatou Diome was born in Niodior on the island of the same name in the Sine-Saloum Delta. She was raised by her grandmother and grandfather and went to school and became passionate about French literature. At the age of 13 she left Niodior and continued her education in M'Bour. Later she moved to Dakar to study at the university, supporting herself by working as a housekeeper.

In 1990, she married a Frenchman and moved to France. Rejected by her traditional Serer family and by his family, she divorced two years later. In 1994, Diome moved to Strasbourg to study at the University of Strasbourg. The title of her Ph.D. thesis was Le Voyage, les échanges et la formation dans l'œuvre littéraire et cinématographique de Ousmane Sembène (Voyage, Exchanges, and Education in the Literary and Cinematographic Work of Ousmane Sembène).

From 2002 to 2003, Diome was a part-time lecturer at Marc Bloch University, Strasbourg, and at the Institute of Pedagogy of Karlsruhe (Germany). From September 2004 to November 2006, she presented the cultural and literary television program Nuit Blanche (Sleepless night) on the French channel France 3 Alsace.

== Works ==
Diome published a collection of short stories, La Préférence nationale, in 2001. Her first novel, The Belly of the Atlantic (French: Le Ventre de l'Atlantique) became a bestseller in France and is published in English by Serpent's Tail. Her first novel was partly autobiographical and is about Salie, a Senegalese immigrant living in Strasbourg, and her younger brother Madicke, who stayed behind in Senegal. After years of struggle Salie has finally arrived and settled in France. Her younger brother dreams of following her to France and becoming a successful football player. The Belly of the Atlantic was translated into English, German and Spanish. Her second novel, Kétala, was published in 2006 in France.

Diome's work explores France and Senegal, and the relationship between the two countries. Her style is influenced by the traditional oral literature of Africa. Her language is authentic and vivid, and it traces a portrait of the difficulties of integrating in France as an immigrant, mixed with nostalgia and memories of a childhood in Senegal.

== Political views ==
Fatou Diome rebels against intolerant people, she defends the role of the school and Republicanism.

Faced with the rise of populism, Fatou Diome is regularly invited to share her point of view on political and social issues on television media or press. In particular, she takes a strong position against the rise of populism in France with the National Rally (RN). As a writer, in her books, she wishes to remind people of the importance of republican and human values because she believes that "when facing people who are obsessed with national identity, we must no longer remain silent."

Diome pursues the subject of debt and neoliberalization in The Belly of the Atlantic (2003) and Celles qui attendent (2010). In both works, debt is used to defend austerity measures and drive immigrants to pursue jobs in other countries under precarious conditions.

Diome also runs messages for a more egalitarian cooperation between Europe and Africa. She believes that, at the moment, Europe is controlling an unequal cooperation where Africa has no control on its assets. She also defends the idea that the former colonial power relationship remains persistent on each African and European people, which prevents this cooperation from being more egalitarian. She thinks that everyone, regardless of their origin, "should feel human being when facing another human being." Therefore, without placing more responsibility on one continent than on the other, Fatou Diome proclaims the need for Africans to free themselves from their victim status and for Europeans to give up their dominant position in order to put an end to exploiting/exploited, donor/recipient schemes. Finally, the author specifies that helping people means helping them not to need you any longer, denouncing the development aid set up by Western countries in Africa among others.

== Bibliography ==
- La Préférence nationale (short stories). Paris/Dakar: Présence africaine, March 16, 2001. ISBN 978-2-7087-0722-1
- Le Ventre de l'Atlantique (novel). Paris: Anne Carrière, August 20, 2003. ISBN 978-2-84337-238-4.
  - Translated as The Belly of the Atlantic. London: Serpent's Tail, September 4, 2006. ISBN 978-1-85242-903-4
- Kétala (novel). Paris: Flammarion, March 10, 2006. ISBN 978-2-08-068993-1
- Inassouvies, nos vies [Our unfulfilled lives] (novel). Paris: Flammarion, 2008. ISBN 978-2-0812-1353-1.
- Le vieil homme sur la barque (autobiographical). Paris: naïve, 2010. (46p.). ISBN 978-2-35021-213-5.
- Celles qui attendent (novel). Paris: Flammarion, 2010. ISBN 978-2-0812-4563-1.
- Mauve, récit, Éditions Flammarion, 2010.
- Impossible de grandir, novel, Éditions Flammarion, 2013. ISBN 9782081290297
- Marianne porte plainte!, essai, Éditions Flammarion, 2017. ISBN 978-2-081408463
- Les veilleurs de Sangomar, novel, Albin Michel, 2019. ISBN 9782226443861
