= Emmanuel Mendy =

Senegalese footballer

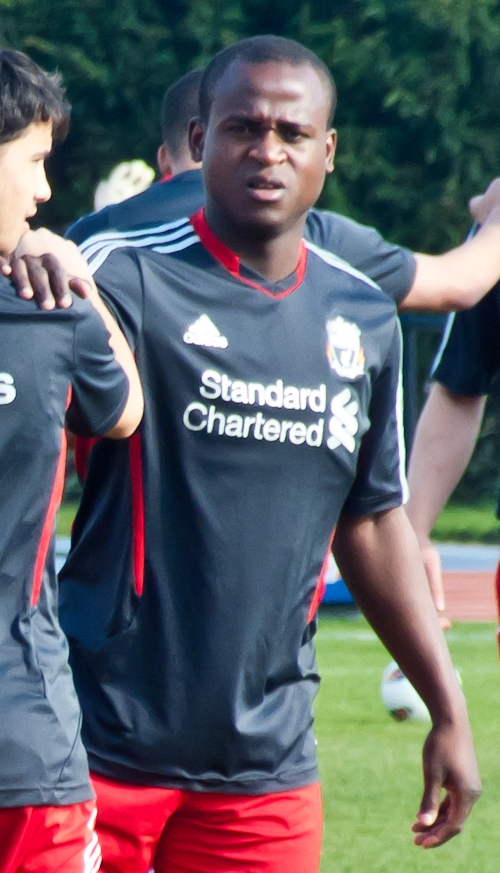
- Mendy with Liverpool reserves in 2012

Personal information
- Full name: Emmanuel Henry Gomis Mendy
- Date of birth: 30 March 1990 (age 36)
- Place of birth: Medina Gounass, Senegal
- Height: 1.75 m (5 ft 9 in)
- Position: Right back

Youth career
- Murcia Deportivo
- Liverpool

Senior career*
Years	Team	Apps	(Gls)
2011–2012	Liverpool	0	(0)
2012–2013	Dinamo Tbilisi	1	(0)
2014	Daugava	19	(0)
2015–2016	Huércal-Overa	18	(1)
2016	Ceahlăul Piatra Neamț	7	(0)
2016–2017	Pulpileño	6	(0)
2017	Eldense	11	(0)
2017	Bergsøy IL	4	(0)
2018	Torre Levante	5	(0)
2018–2019	Huércal-Overa	18	(0)

International career
2016	Guinea-Bissau	4	(0)
- * Club domestic league appearances and goals as of 16:14, 11 August 2020 (UTC)

Emmanuel Henry Gomis Mendy (born 30 March 1990) is a professional footballer who plays as a right back.

Raised in Spain, he never played higher than Segunda División B, and had unsuccessful spells at clubs in five foreign countries, including Liverpool. Mendy chose to represent Guinea-Bissau at international level, making his debut in 2016 and being chosen for the 2017 Africa Cup of Nations.

== Club career ==
Born in Medina Gounass, Senegal, Mendy emigrated to the Spanish town of Vícar, Almería as an infant and is a naturalised Spanish citizen. He began his career as a youth at Murcia Deportivo CF and was signed by Premier League club Liverpool in July 2008.

Mendy never made the senior team at Anfield and went to FC Dinamo Tbilisi in Georgia in 2012; he missed several months through an ankle injury after his first game and was then no longer required. He then spent an entire year unemployed before being signed by FK Daugava in Latvia. Having only been paid for two of five months' work for the Riga-based club, he returned to Spain and swore never to work abroad again.

After a spell at Tercera División club Huércal-Overa CF, Mendy went back abroad in early 2016 to play for CSM Ceahlăul Piatra Neamț in Liga II, a team who refused to pay their players anything more than a daily meal in a soup kitchen. Having lost seven kilograms through the ordeal, he returned to Spain's fourth tier at CA Pulpileño. In January 2017, he moved up a level by signing for CD Eldense in Segunda División B, and caused a police investigation in April that year when he stated to Cadena SER that the club's assistant manager, Fran Ruiz, had told him to throw a game against FC Barcelona B.

== International career ==
Mendy represents Guinea-Bissau at international level, becoming eligible through his parents. He made his debut on 23 March 2016 in a 1–0 win away to Kenya in qualification for the 2017 Africa Cup of Nations. Due to the suspension of regular goalkeeper Jonas Mendes, he used his connections to recommend Papa Massé Fall, another Senegalese-born player resident in Vícar, to be in goal for the next game against Zambia in June.
