= Mbam =

Mbam or MBAM may refer to:

- Mbam, Senegal, a village in the Fatick Region of Senegal
- Mbam languages, a language family
- Malwarebytes (software), an anti-malware software formerly abbreviated as MBAM
- The Musée des beaux-arts de Montréal, abbreviated as MBAM
- N,N'-Methylenebisacrylamide (MBAm), a chemical
