= Koulountou River =

River in West Africa

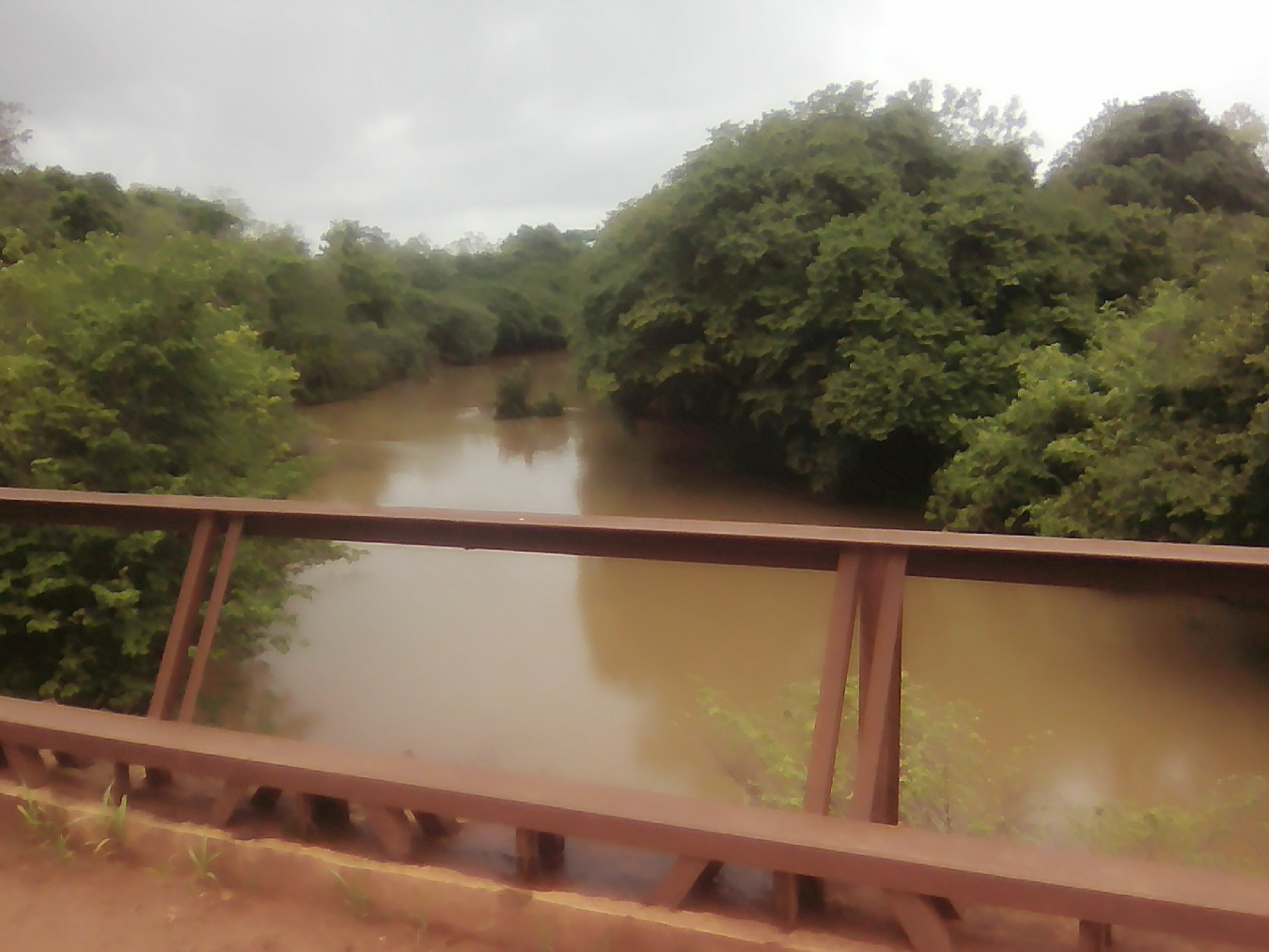

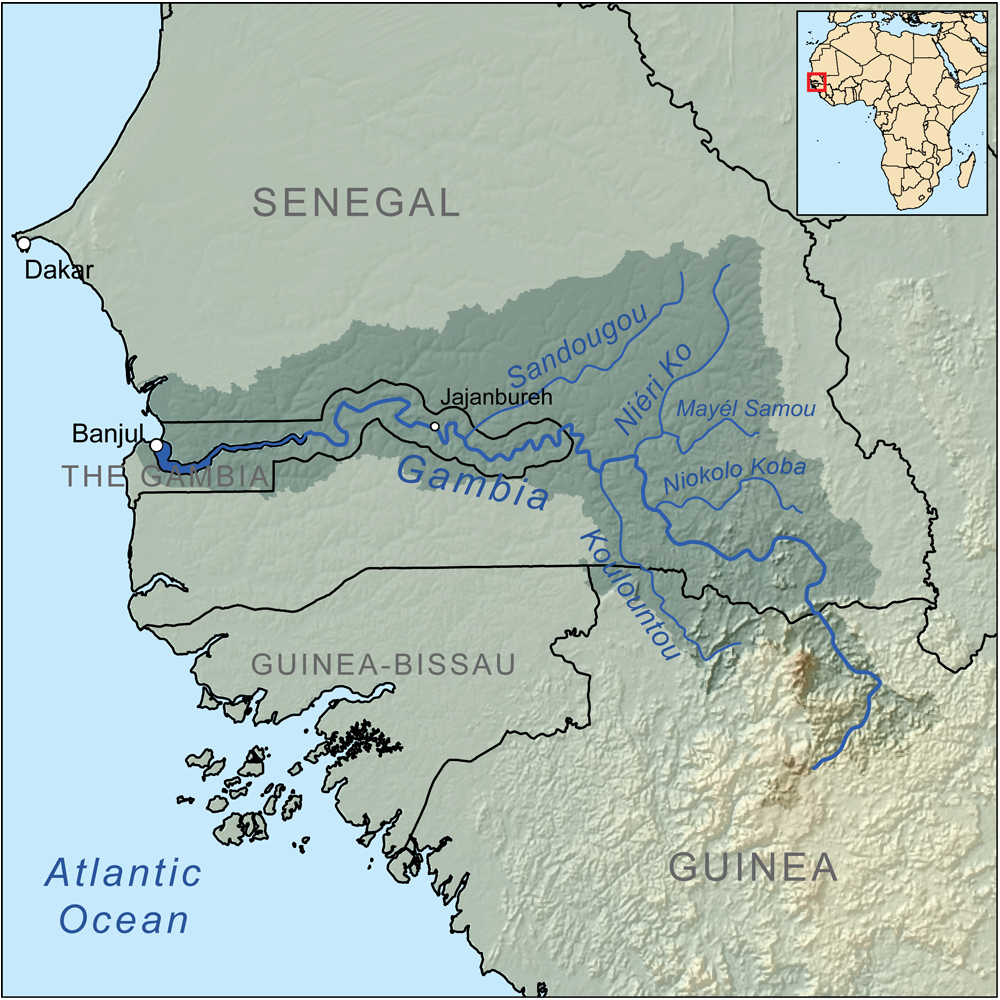
- Map of the Gambia River drainage basin

Location
- Countries: Guinea; Senegal

Physical characteristics
- Source: Fouta Djallon
- Mouth: Atlantic Ocean
  - location: Banjul
  - coordinates: 13.25°N 13.61667°W
- Length: 1,120 km (700 mi)

The Koulountou River (French: Rivière Koulountou) is a river in Senegal and Guinea. It is a tributary of the Gambia River.

The river's source is the Fouta Djallon plateau in northern Guinea. For most of its course, the river flows through southern Senegal.

Settlements on the river include Nadjaf Al Ashraf in Vélingara Department, Senegal.
