= Linkéring =

- Rural community
- Location within Senegal
- Country: Senegal
- Region: Kolda Region
- Department: Vélingara Department
- Arrondissement: Bonconto
- Time zone: UTC+0 (GMT)

Linkéring is a rural community of Bonconto Arrondissement in the Vélingara Department, Kolda Region, Senegal.
