= Bounkiling =

- Town and commune
- Location in Senegal
- Coordinates: 13°3′N 15°42′W
- Country: Senegal
- Region: Sédhiou
- Department: Bounkiling

Area
  - Town and commune: 3.419 km^{2} (1.320 sq mi)

Population (2023 census)
  - Town and commune: 9,969
  - Density: 2,916/km^{2} (7,552/sq mi)
- Time zone: UTC+0 (GMT)

Bounkiling is a town of commune status in the Sédhiou Region of Senegal. It is the capital of the Bounkiling Department. The population in 2013 was 6,416, an increase from the 2,651 counted in 2002.

The town lies on the important N4 road, the Trans-Gambia Highway linking Kaolack to Ziguinchor.
