= Sédhiou =

Town in Casamance, Senegal

- Town
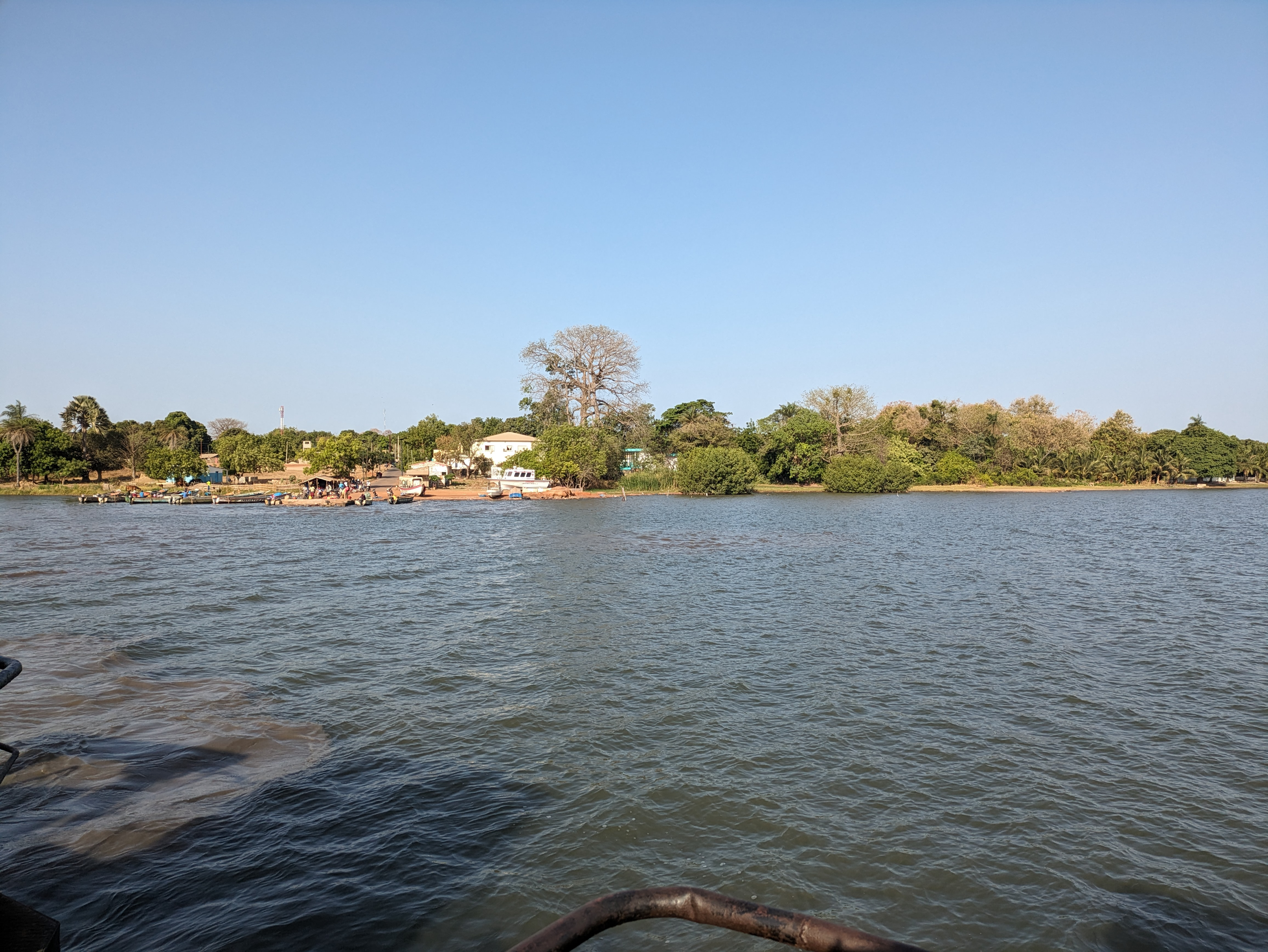

- Location within Senegal
- Coordinates: 12.70851°N 15.55583°W
- Country: Senegal
- Region: Sédhiou Region
- Department: Sédhiou Department

Population (2023 census)
  - Total: 31,511

Sédhiou (Wolof: Seéju) is a town of Senegal, in Casamance area, nearby the Casamance river, with a population of 31,511 in 2023. It is the capital of the Sédhiou Region.

== History ==
Sedhiou was originally a Banyun settlement located at an important river crossing for trade caravans as well as the uppermost limit of the tidal flow of the Casamance. Upon the establishment of the Kaabu federation it became one of the state's constituent kingdoms, ruled by the Mandinka.

The French established a military post at Sedhiou in 1838. Euro-African traders from Saint-Louis, Goree, and Bathurst increasingly competed with native merchants, creating tensions in surrounding communities. Muslim Mandinka allied with the Fula of Futa Jallon to attack the animist Mandinka of Sedhiou in 1843, imposing tribute on them, although the war continued for years.

In 1861 Sedhiou became the seat of one of the first seven arrondissements of the French colony of Senegal. In 1876 the marabout Fode Kaba raided the Balanta villages nearby, but was forced to withdraw by the French forces stationed in the town. His ally Sounkari, the chief of Bacoum, nevertheless continued the fight and unsuccessfully besieged the French fort in 1882. He was eventually defeated by Alfred Dodds in 1887.

Sedhiou was the capital of colonial Casamance from 1883 to 1906, when it moved to Ziguinchor. The commune of Sedhiou is created in February 1960.

== Geography ==
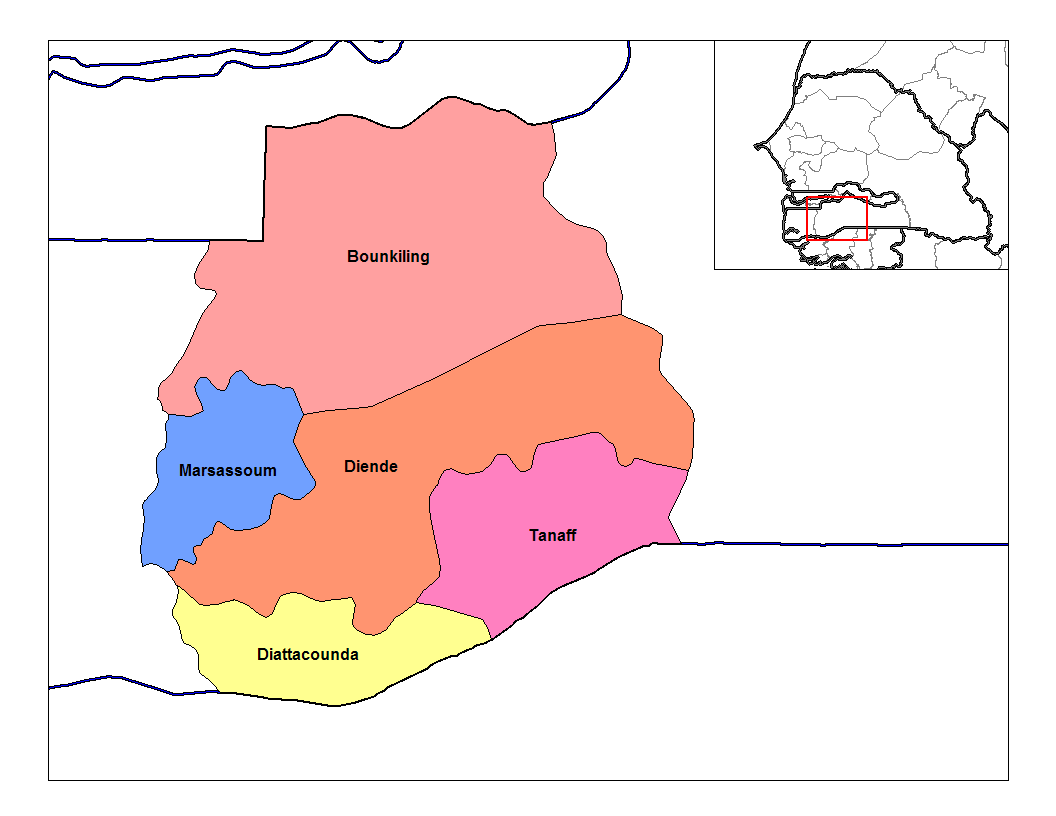
Sédhiou Arrondissements

It is the capital of the Sédhiou Region.

== Demographics ==
In 1983, 13,212 inhabitants lived in the town, rising to 18,465 in 2002. At the 2013 census Sédhiou had a population of 24,213.

== Notable people ==
- Sadio Mané (born 1992), professional footballer who plays for Saudi Pro League club Al Nassr FC and the Senegal national team.

== Twin town ==
- Les Ulis
