= Bounkiling department =

Coordinates: 13°01′19″N 15°24′50″W

Bounkiling
- Department
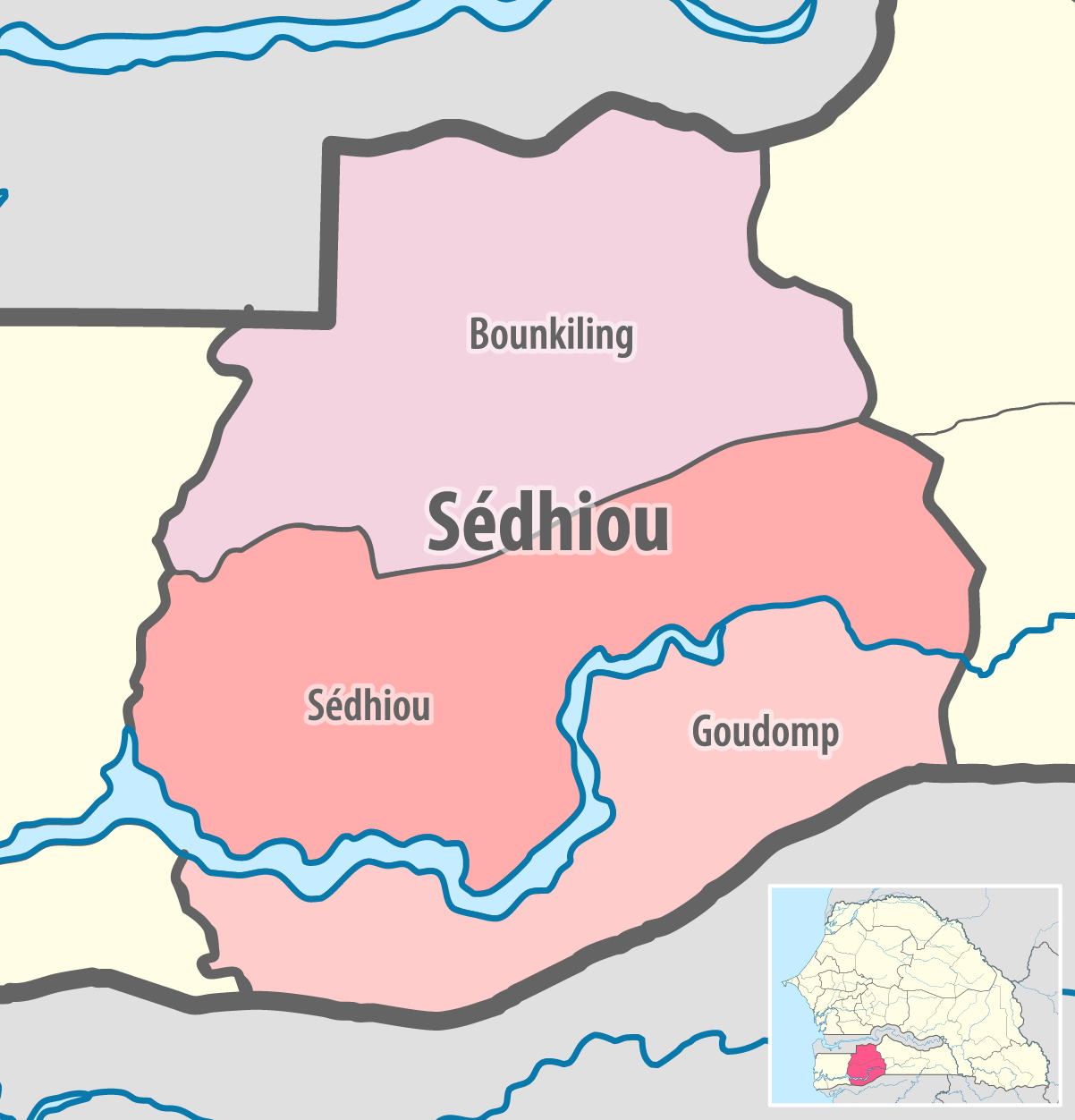
- Map of Bounkiling department in Sédhiou region, Senegal
- Country: Senegal
- Region: Sédhiou region
- Capital: Bounkiling

Population (2023 census)
  - Total: 208,380
- Time zone: UTC±00:00 (GMT)

Bounkiling department is one of the 46 departments of Senegal, one of the three making up the Sédhiou region. It was created in 2008 along with the Sédhiou region, which was formerly part of the Kolda region.

The department has two communes: Bounkiling and Madina Wandifa.

The rural districts (communautés rurales) comprise:

- Arrondissement of Boghal:
  - Boghal
  - Tankon
  - Ndiamacouta
- Arrondissement of Bona:
  - Bona
  - Diacounda
  - Inor
  - Kandiong Mangana
- Arrondissement of Diaroumé
  - Diaroumé
  - Diambati
  - Faoune
