= Niodior Arrondissement =

- Arrondissement
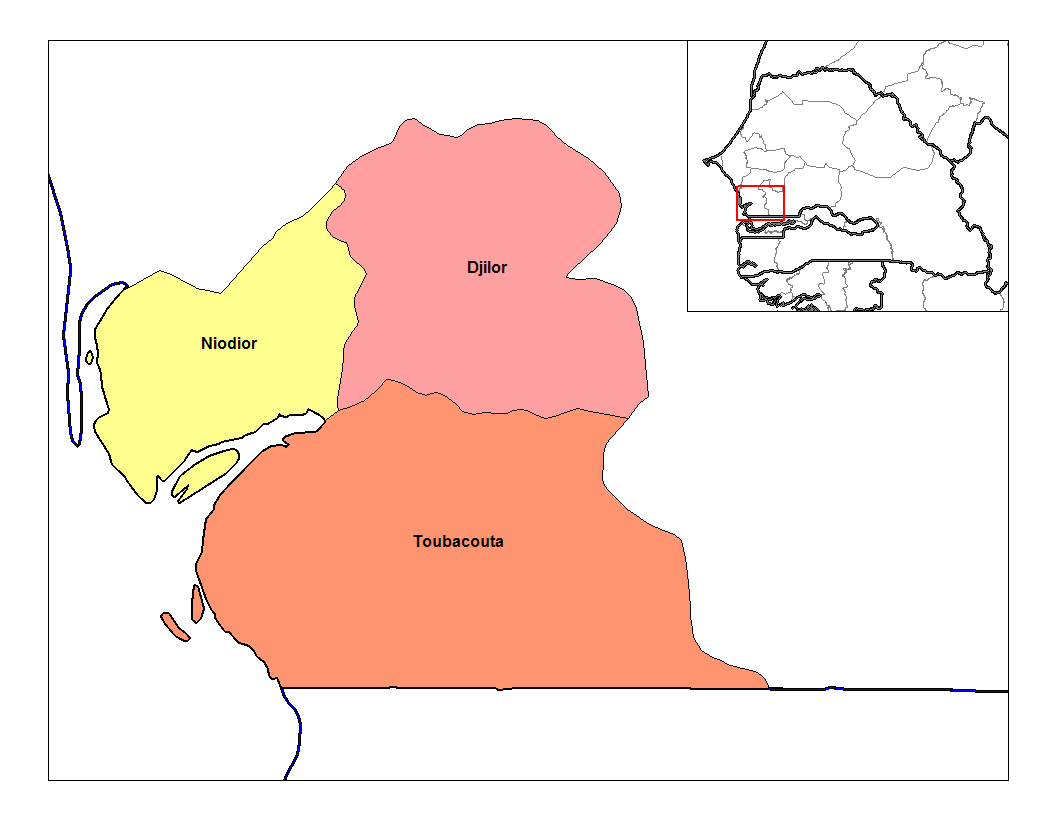
- Location in the Foundiougne Department
- Country: Senegal
- Region: Fatick Region
- Department: Foundiougne Department
- Time zone: UTC±00:00 (GMT)

Niodior Arrondissement is an arrondissement of the Foundiougne Department in the Fatick Region of Senegal.

== Subdivisions ==
The arrondissement is divided administratively into rural communities and in turn into villages.
