= Toubacouta =

- Town
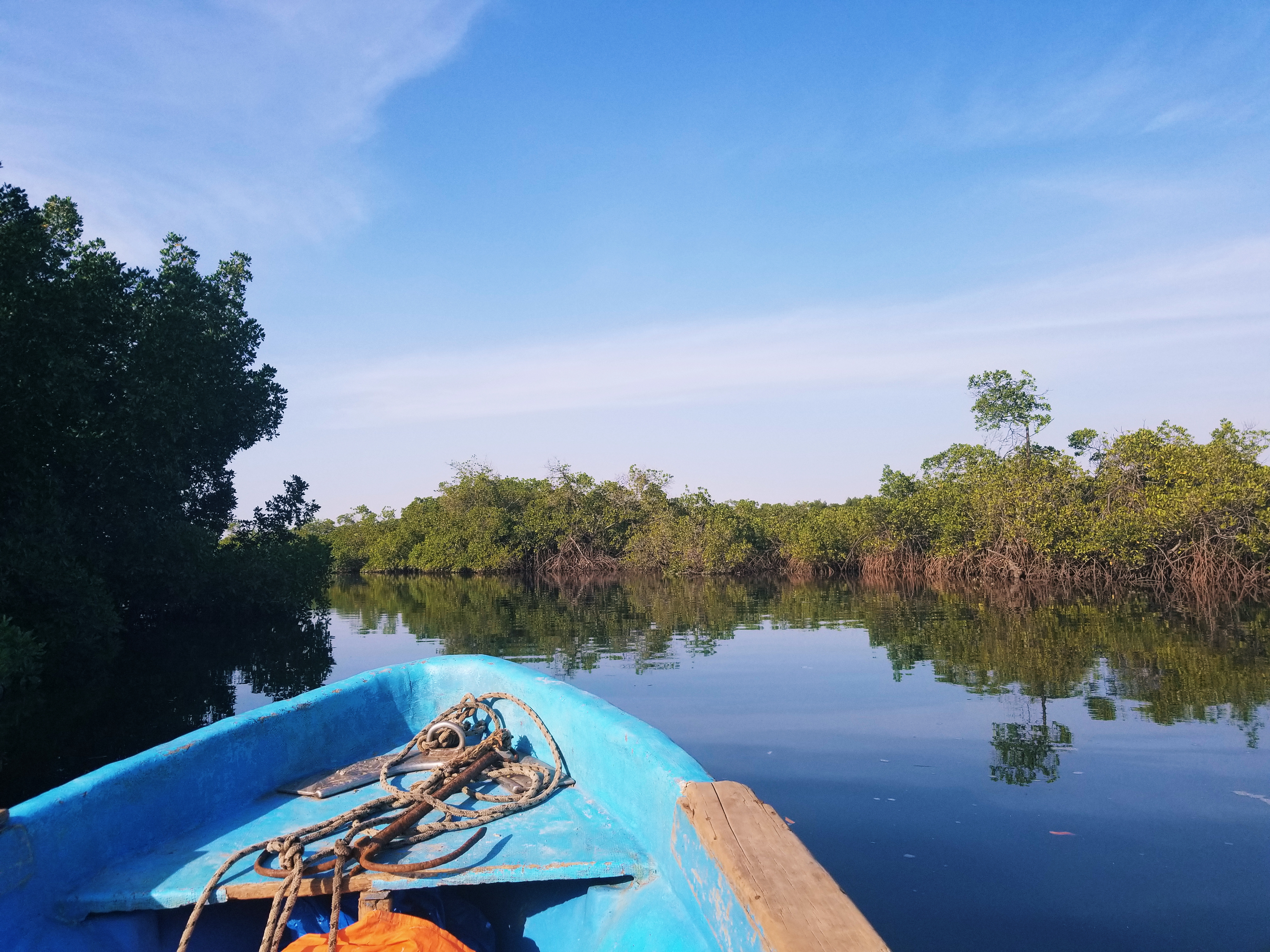
- Mangroves near Toubacouta

- Location within Senegal
- Coordinates: 13°47′N 16°28′W
- Country: Senegal
- Region: Fatick Region
- Department: Foundiougne Department
- Arrondissement: Toubacouta Arrondissement
- Time zone: UTC+0 (GMT)

Toubacouta or Toubakouta is a town and arrondissement of Senegal, in the Fatick Region. It sited in the Saloum Delta, National Park and World Heritage Site. It has 3,000 inhabitants, and is a Mandinka village.
