= CA Pulpileño =

Association football club in Spain

Atlético Pulpileño
- Full name: Club Atlético Pulpileño
- Founded: 2002
- Ground: Estadio San Miguel, Pulpí, Spain
- Capacity: 2,000
- Chairman: (Spain) Mariano Muñoz
- Manager: (Spain) Placido Baena
- League: Tercera Federación – Group 13
- 2025–26: Tercera Federación – Group 13, 9th of 18
Home colours	Away colours

Club Atlético Pulpileño is a football team based in Pulpí, Almería, but has its headquarters in Pozo de la Higuera, Murcia. Founded in 2002, the team plays in Tercera Federación – Group 13. The club's home ground is Estadio San Miguel.

== Season to season ==
Season	Tier	Division	Place	Copa del Rey
2002–03	6	1ª Terr.	10th	
2003–04	6	1ª Terr.	12th	
2004–05	6	1ª Terr.	10th	
2005–06	6	1ª Terr.	7th	
2006–07	6	1ª Terr.	1st	
2007–08	5	Terr. Pref.	2nd	
2008–09	4	3ª	11th	
2009–10	4	3ª	8th	
2010–11	4	3ª	8th	
2011–12	4	3ª	11th	
2012–13	4	3ª	9th	
2013–14	4	3ª	17th	
2014–15	5	Pref. Aut.	3rd	
2015–16	4	3ª	14th	
2016–17	4	3ª	12th	
2017–18	4	3ª	3rd	
2018–19	4	3ª	5th	
2019–20	4	3ª	2nd	
2020–21	4	3ª	3rd / 2nd	
2021–22	4	2ª RFEF	15th	

Season	Tier	Division	Place	Copa del Rey
2022–23	5	3ª Fed.	5th	
2023–24	5	3ª Fed.	8th	
2024–25	5	3ª Fed.	6th	
2025–26	5	3ª Fed.	9th	
2026–27	5	3ª Fed.		

- 1 season in Segunda División RFEF
- 12 seasons in Tercera División
- 5 seasons in Tercera Federación

== Noted players ==
- (Equatorial Guinea) Anselmo (2010)
- (Equatorial Guinea) (Liberia) Lawrence Doe (2008–2009, 2010)
- (Guinea-Bissau) Emmanuel Mendy (2016–)
