= Mamadou Baldé =

Equatoguinean footballer

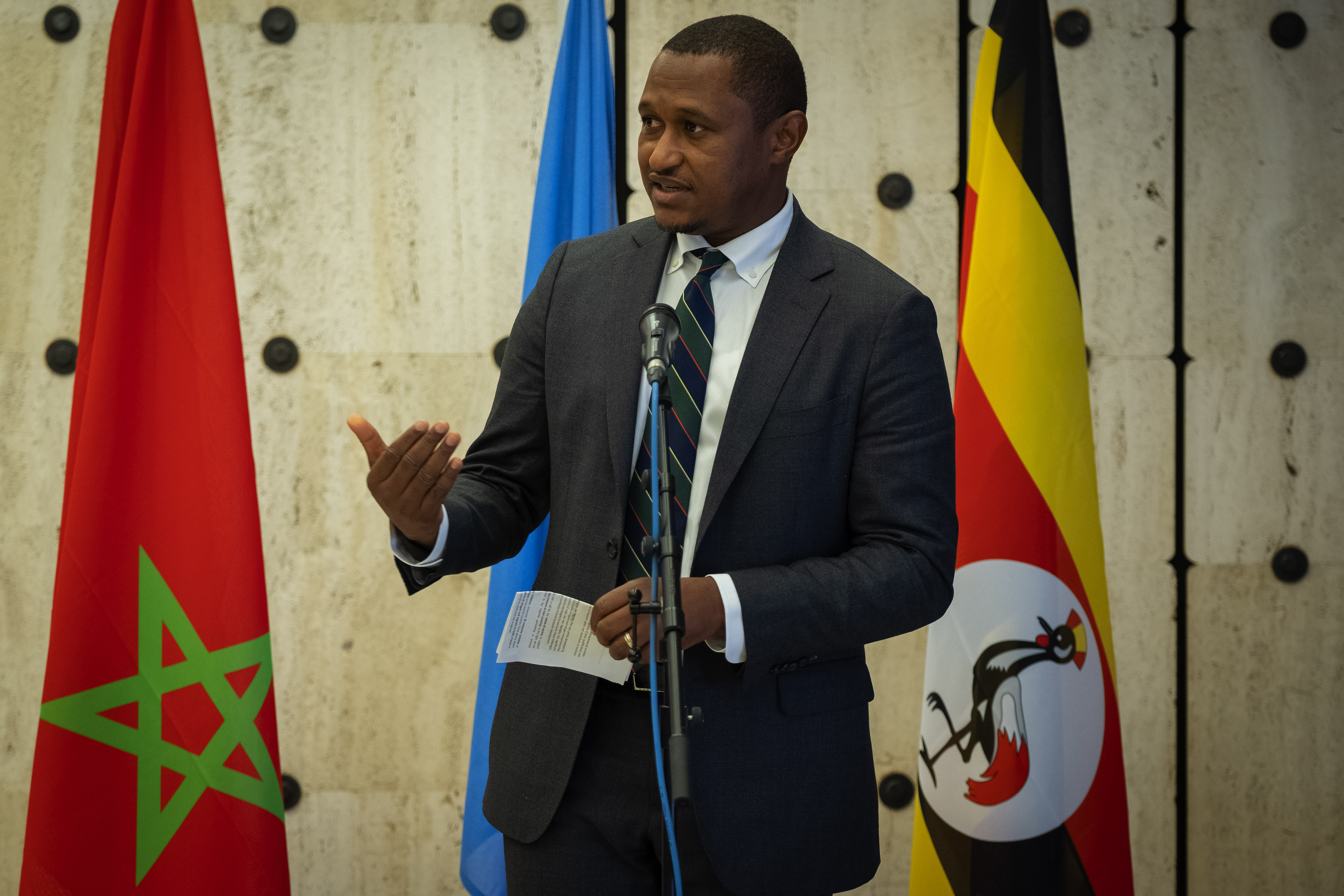

Personal information
- Full name: Mamadou Papys Baldé
- Date of birth: 12 December 1985 (age 40)
- Place of birth: Velingara, Senegal
- Height: 1.81 m (5 ft 11 in)
- Position: Centre-back

Youth career
- 1993–1994: CFJA Aldo Gentina
- 1995–2001: Génération Foot Dakar
- 2001–2003: Bordeaux

Senior career*
Years	Team	Apps	(Gls)
2003–2007	Bordeaux B	37	(3)
2006–2007	→ Legia Warsaw (loan)	11	(0)
2007–2009	Clermont Foot	0	(0)
2010–2011	Langon-Castets	4	(0)

International career
2010	Equatorial Guinea	1	(0)
2011	Equatorial Guinea B	1	(0)
- * Club domestic league appearances and goals

Mamadou Papys Baldé (born 12 December 1985) is a former professional footballer who played as a defender. Born in Senegal, he represented Equatorial Guinea internationally.

== Career ==
In October 2006, he left Legia Warsaw and came back to Senegal for personal reasons and he didn't come back for a long time. His first appearance after the break took place on 28 November 2006 in the friendly game against Zagłębie Sosnowiec.

=== International career ===
In 2010, Baldé accepted to be naturalized Equatoguinean by the Equatoguinean Football Federation and played for the Equatorial Guinea national team in a friendly against Botswana on 12 October.
