= Foundiougne department =

Coordinates: 14°08′N 16°28′W

Foundiougne
- Department
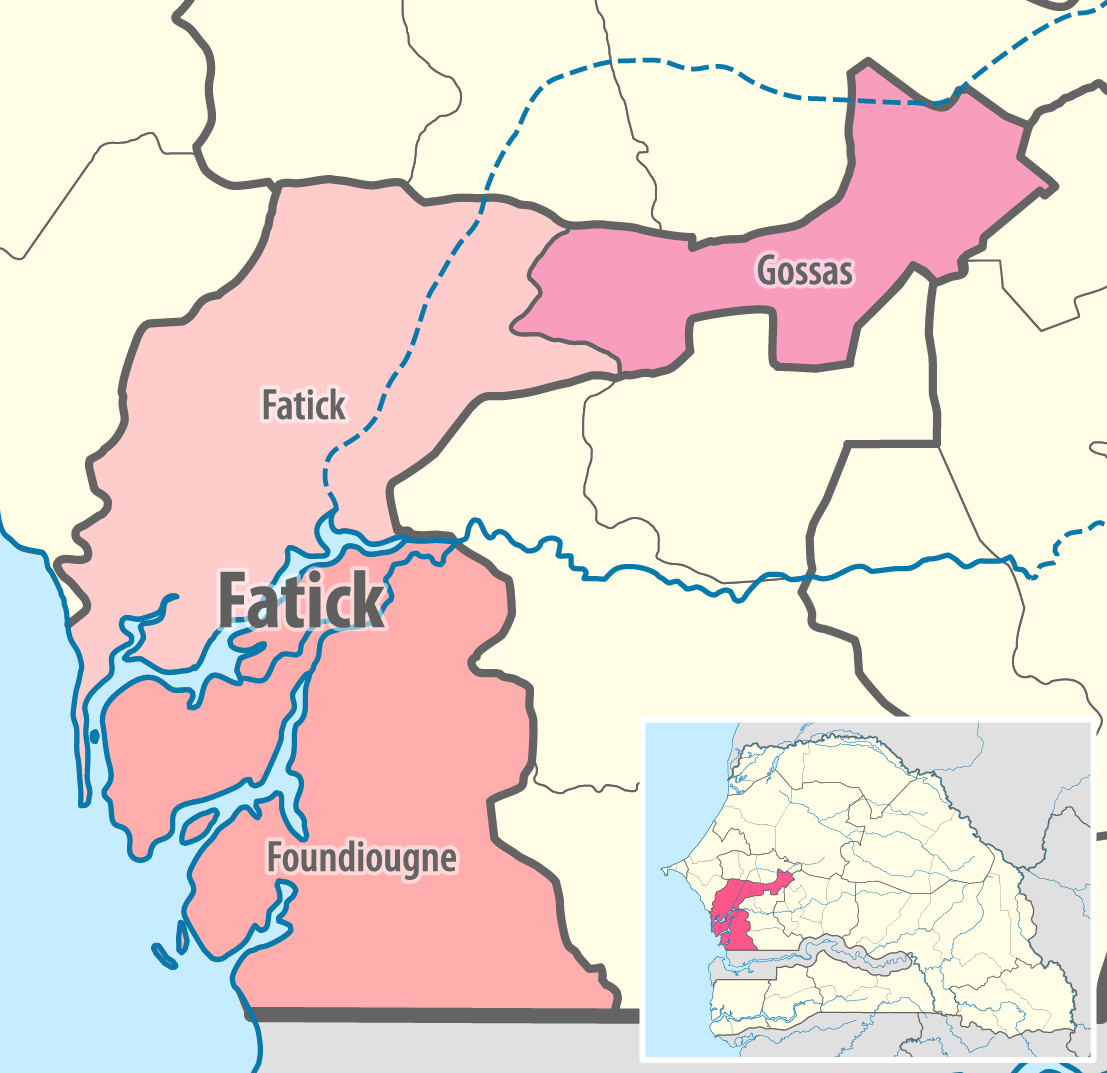
- Location in the Fatick region
- Country: Senegal
- Region: Fatick region
- Capital: Foundiougne

Area
  - Total: 2,959 km^{2} (1,142 sq mi)

Population (2023 census)
  - Total: 376,408
  - Density: 127.2/km^{2} (329.5/sq mi)
- Time zone: UTC+0 (GMT)

Foundiougne department is one of the departments of Senegal, located in the Fatick region.

== Economy ==
Foundiougne is a main hub on the Sine-Saloum river in the Fatick region of Senegal. It is a popular launch pad for eco-tours to see the abundant mangroves along the river. A ferry (connecting Foundiougne to the main road leading to Fatick) crosses the river at set times throughout the day transporting locals and tourists alike. Services that can be found include a post office, hospital, grocery stores, a pharmacy, restaurants, an internet cafe, and hotels. A high school in town serves Foundiougne and Mbam. There is a market every Tuesday (called a luma) on the edge of town, near the road to Mbam. At the weekly luma, residents can purchase anything that they might require, ranging from plastic buckets to cooking pots to fabric to sandals to western clothing. It is an important center for residents of nearby villages, who travel to Foundiougne often on horse-drawn chariots.

== Administrative divisions ==
There are five communes in the department: Foundiougne, Passy, Sokone, Soum and Karang Poste.

The rural districts (communautés rurales) comprise:

- Djilor Arrondissement:
  - Diossong
  - Djilor
  - Niassène
  - Diagane Barka
  - Mbam
- Niodior Arrondissement:
  - Bassoul
  - Dionewar
  - Djirnda
- Toubacouta Arrondissement:
  - Keur Saloum Diané
  - Keur Samba Guèye
  - Toubacouta
  - Nioro Alassane Tall

== Historic sites ==
Foundiougne and Sokone towns

- Cannons (2) installed along the arm of the sea at Ndakhonga, north of Foundiougne
- Prefecture building
- Mosque of El Hadj Amadou Dème at Sokone

Djilor

- Site of Laga Ndong, at Ndorong-Log, fangool of the Sereer pantheon
- Pecc, place of the cult of the Gelwars of Saloum

Niodior

- 149 tumuli (Ndiamon-Badat) near Dionewar
- 17 tumuli (Apetch) near Dionewar
- Tumuli (Fandanga) near Niodior
- 26 tumuli (Ndiouta-Boumak) near Niodior
- 12 tumuli (Ndafafé) at Falia
- 168 and 54 tumuli (Tioupane-Boumak and Tioupane-Boundaw) at Falia
- 17 tumuli (Sandalé Déralé) near Diogane
- 4 tumuli (Mbar Fagnick) near Diogane
- 6 tumuli near the Bakhalou
- 77 tumuli of the left bank of the river Djombos

Toubacouta

- 125 tumuli (Dioron-Boumak) near Toubacouta, on the west bank of the Bandiala
- 12 tumuli (Dioron-Boundaw) 1.5 km south of above
- 14 tumuli south-west of above
- 63 tumuli on the north bank of the fork of the Bossinka
- 30 tumuli (Bandiokouta) on the right bank of an arm of the fork of the Bossinka
- 72 tumuli on the right bank of the Oudiérin
- 33 tumuli at Soukarta, on farmland near the Bandiala
