= Médina Yoro Foulah department =

Coordinates: 13°18′N 14°43′W

Médina Yoro Foulah
- Department
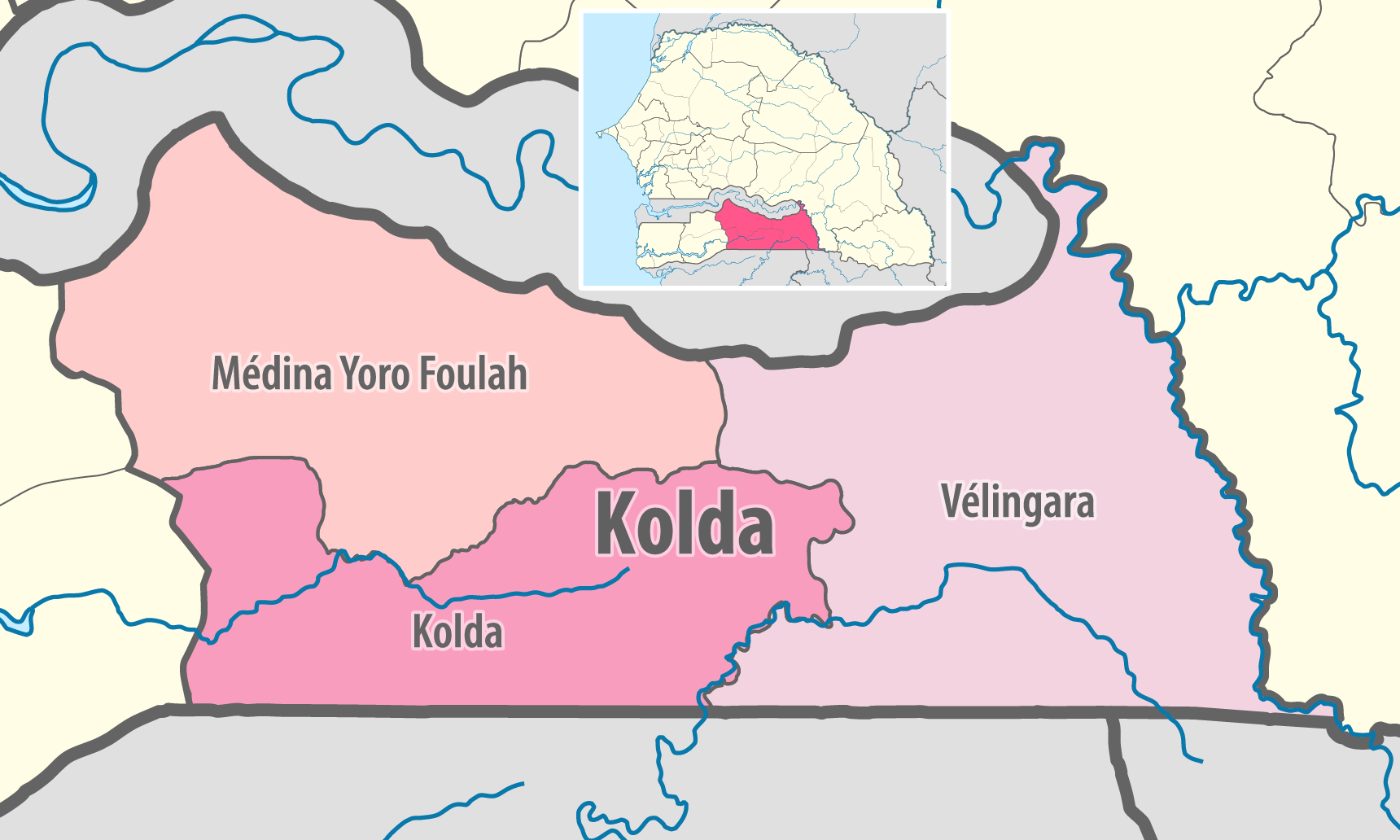
- Country: Senegal
- Region: Kolda region
- Capital: Médina Yoro Foulah

Area
  - Total: 4,702 km^{2} (1,815 sq mi)

Population (2023 census)
  - Total: 185,575
  - Density: 39.47/km^{2} (102.2/sq mi)
- Time zone: UTC±00:00 (GMT)

Médina Yoro Foulah is one of the 46 departments of Senegal, located in the Kolda region. It was created in 2008.

It contains two communes: Médina Yoro Foulah and Pata

The rural districts (communautés rurales) comprise:

- Arrondissement of Fafacourou:
  - Badion
  - Fafacourou
- Arrondissement of Ndorna:
  - Bourouco
  - Bignarabé
  - Ndorna
  - Koulinto
- Arrondissement of Niaming:
  - Niaming
  - Dinguiraye (Kolda)
  - Kéréwane

== Historic sites ==
- Fortification of Moussa Molo Baldé at Ndorna
- Tomb of Coumba Oudé at Soulabaly
- Hamdallahi historic site
