= Saré Coly Sallé (arrondissement) =

- Arrondissement
- Location within Senegal
- Country: Senegal

Saré Coly Sallé is an arrondissement of Vélingara in Thiès Region in Senegal.
