= Foundiougne =

- Town
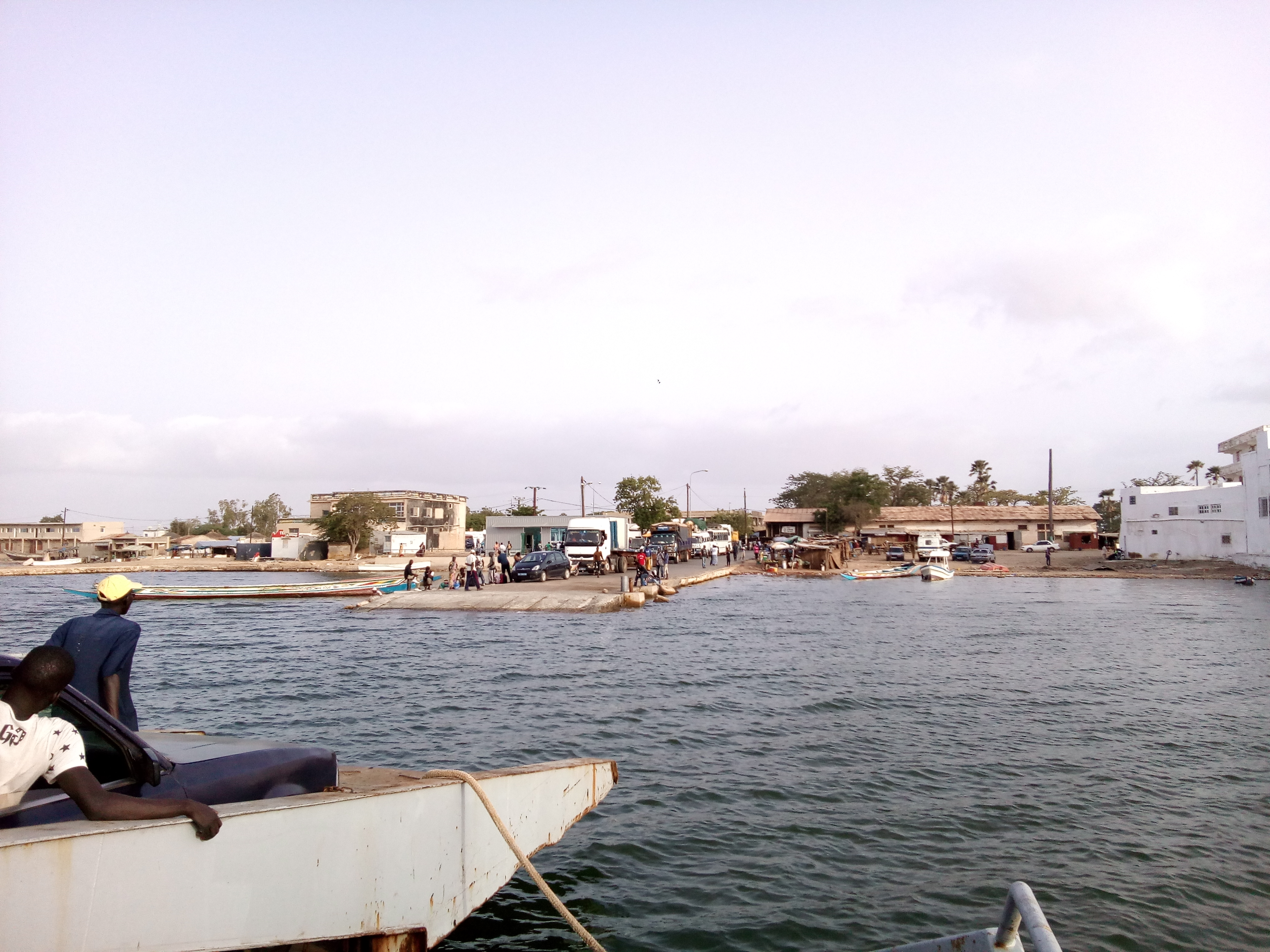
- View of Foundiougne from the ferry

- Location within Senegal
- Coordinates: 14°07′N 16°28′W
- Country: Senegal
- Region: Fatick Region
- Department: Foundiougne Department

Government
  - Mayor: Thiémokho Ndiaye

Population (2023 census)
  - Total: 8,924
- Time zone: UTC+0 (GMT)

Foundiougne is a city in the Fatick Region of Senegal. It is a port, lying on the Saloum River delta, and an access point to the mangroves in the area. In March 2022, the Nelson Mandela Bridge opened over the Saloum, linking Foundiougne with Fatick and the northern part of the country.

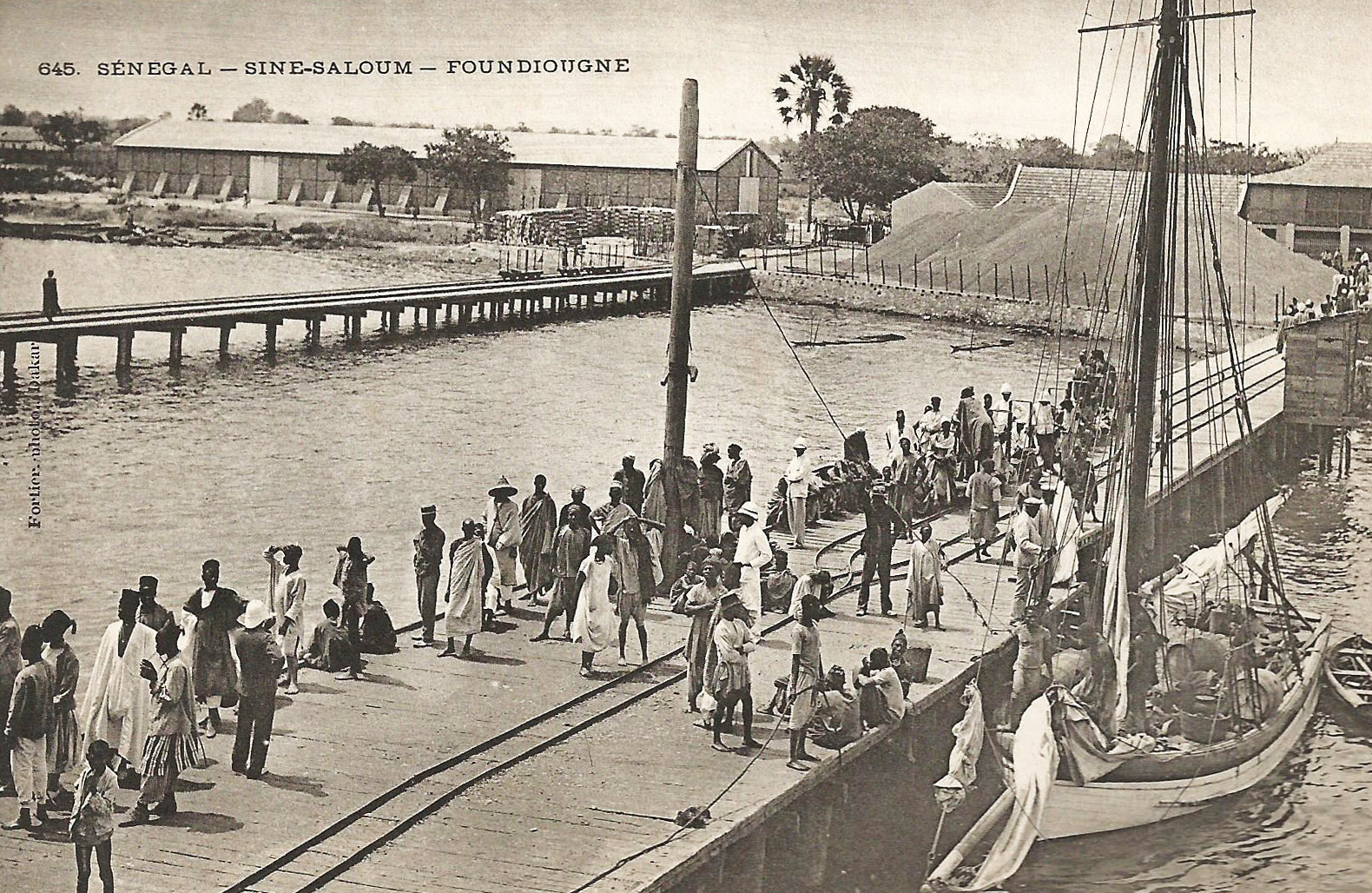
The port of Foundiougne in the early 20th century
