= Mbam, Senegal =

Mbam is a village in the Fatick Region of Senegal, 2km from the town of Foundiougne. The unofficial population is around 4,000.

== Trade and commerce ==
As a primary means of income, the village produces life vests, peanuts, rice, and mangoes.

== Education ==
The village is home to a nursery school (École Maternelle), a primary school (École 1), and a middle school (CEM). To attend lycée, students must travel daily to Foundiougne.

== Ecotourism ==
The village hosts NGOs from several countries including an organization called 'Living Routes'. 'Living 'Routes' brings students from other countries to experience the village life, often while conducting research projects or taking part in service work intended to benefit the community.
