= Sédhiou department =

Coordinates: 12.71°N 15.56°W

Sédhiou
- Department
- Country: Senegal
- Region: Sédhiou region
- Capital: Sédhiou

Population (2023 census)
  - Total: 193,867
- Time zone: UTC+0 (GMT)

Sédhiou department is one of the 46 departments of Senegal, one of three making up the Sédhiou region, formerly part of the Kolda region.

The department has three communes: Diannah Malary, Marsassoum and Sédhiou.

The rural districts (communautés rurales) comprise:

- Arrondissement of Diendé:
  - Oudoucar
  - Koussy
  - Diannah Ba
  - Sama Kanta Peulh
  - Sakar
  - Diendé
- Arrondissement of Djibabouya:
  - Djibabouya
  - Sansamba
  - Bémet Bidjini
- Arrondissement de Djiredji
  - Djiredji

== Notable people born in Sédhiou ==
- Association football player Sadio Mané was born in Bambali, a small town in Sédhiou.

== Historic sites ==
- Fortification of Fodé Kaba Doumbouya at Sédhiou
- Fort Pinet-Laprade, town of Sédhiou
- Sédhiou Prefecture
