= Cherif Mohamed Aly Aidara =

Senegalese-Mauritanian Shia religious leader

Chérif Mohamed Aly Aïdara
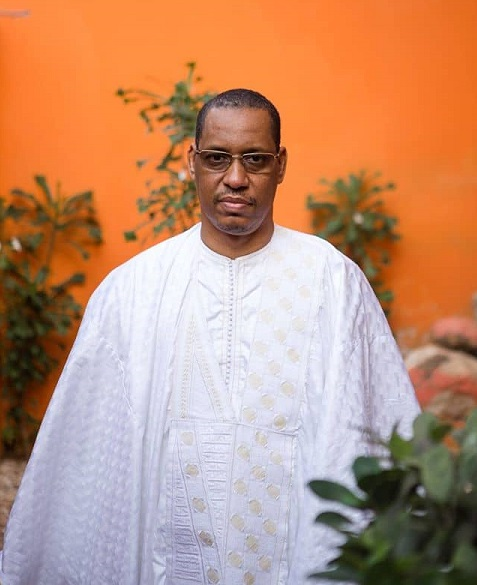
- Portrait of Chérif Mohamed Aly Aïdara
- Born: 1959 (age 66–67); Darou Hidjiratou, Kolda Region, Senegal
- Citizenship: Senegalese and Mauritanian
- Occupations: Shi'i religious leader and international development specialist
- Known for: Founder of Mozdahir
- Parents: Cherif Al-Hassane Aidara (father); Maimouna Diao (mother)
- Relatives: Cherif Habib Aidara (brother)

Cherif Mohamed Aly Aidara is a Senegalese-Mauritanian Shia religious leader who is known for his work on international development in West Africa. He is one of the primary Shia religious figures in Senegal and West Africa.

== Early life and family ==
Of mixed Mauritanian and Fulani descent, Cherif Mohamed Aly Aidara was born in 1959 in Darou Hidjiratou, a village in Bonconto Commune, Kolda Region, southern Senegal, which was founded by his father. His father is Cherif Al-Hassane Aidara, a Mauritanian man from the Al Lakhal branch of the Laghlal tribe of Mauritania who claims descent from Moulay Idriss of the Idrisid dynasty, while his mother is Maimouna Diao, a Senegalese Peul (Fulani) woman from the Diao clan. As a Senegalese sharif, Aidara claims direct descent from Muhammad (see silsila).

After completing traditional Islamic education in Senegal, much of which was taught by his father, Aidara continued his education at the Alliance française in Paris, France. He is fluent in Arabic, English, French, Pulaar (Fulfulde), and Wolof.

His brother Cherif Habib Aidara is the leader of Bonconto Commune.

== Career ==
In 2000, Cherif Mohamed Aly Aidara founded the NGO Mozdahir International Institute in Senegal. Aidara has focused on education and development, such as managing social development projects, promoting the use of Islamic microfinance, and increasing awareness of Shi'i Islam in Senegal.

During his early career, Aidara focused his development and educational projects mostly in the Casamance region (Fouladou) of southern Senegal, but has since expanded beyond Senegal into other parts of West Africa, including Mali, Guinea Bissau, Burkina Faso, Ivory Coast, and other African countries. He frequently travels internationally and collaborates with major international NGOs such as the World Food Programme.

He has built and expanded the Mozdahir community across Senegalese cities such as Dakar, Dahra Djoloff, Kolda, Ziguinchor, Saloum, and Vélingara. He also founded the Mozdahir community village of Nadjaf Al Achraf and helped develop Teyel and Foulamori villages, with schools and mosques constructed in each of those villages.

Aidara also directs the radio stations Radio Mozdahir FM in Dakar, and Radio Zahra FM in Kolda (see also list of radio stations in Senegal).

== Works ==
Books in French:

- Les Vérités de La Succession du Prophète
- Sayyidda Zaynab (pslf) l’héroïne de Karbala
- La prière du Prophète Mouhammad (pslf) selon les membres de sa famille
- Ghadir Khoum : Qui relate l’évènement de Ghadir et le fameux discours du prophète (pslf) ce jour-là.
- Achoura jour de deuil ou jour de fête ?
- Principes de la finance islamique

== See also ==
- Shia Islam in Senegal
- Mozdahir
- Darou Hidjiratou
