= Shia Islam in Senegal =

Religion in Senegal

Shia Islam in Senegal is practiced small number of Senegalese people, as well as by the Lebanese community in Senegal.

== Background ==
According to historian Alioune Badiane, Shia Islam has been present in Senegal for many centuries, and can be traced back to the Idrisid Dynasty.

Unlike Shia Islam in Nigeria, in Senegal Shia Islam has generally coexisted peacefully with the dominant Sunni Islam branches and the Senegalese government.

Shia Islam is the primary religion of the Lebanese community in Senegal, which has been established in Senegal for over a century. It is also practiced by a growing number of native Senegalese, including the Wolof and Fula peoples. Since the 1970s, the number of native Shi'i Senegalese has steadily increased in both urban and rural areas.

== Lebanese community ==
Lebanese have historically formed economically dominant communities in West Africa, including in Senegal. The Lebanese community in Senegal was established around the turn of the 20th century. Hence, many Lebanese in Senegal were born outside Lebanon, do not hold Lebanese citizenship, and have never been to Lebanon.

Unlike Shia Islam in some other Islamic countries, Shia Islam in Senegal has not experienced significant conflicts with the state or with other branches of Islam. Rather, in Senegal, Shia Islam organizations and leaders have focused much more on social development, education, and charity.

== Anthropological studies ==
Mara A. Leichtman, an American anthropologist at Michigan State University, has spent over a decade carrying out fieldwork on Shia Islam and Sufism in Senegal, and has published various books and papers on her fieldwork. Leichtman distinguishes between the form of Shia Islam practiced by the Lebanese community in Senegal, as well as an "indigenous African Shi'ism" growing in popularity among local Senegalese.

Leichtman has also conducted anthropological studies of major Shia organizations in Senegal such as the Mozdahir International Institute, headed by Senegalese Shi'i religious leader Cherif Mohamed Aly Aidara. According to Leichtman (2017), Mozdahir's various rural development projects help bridge the urban-rural divide among Shi'i Muslims in Senegal, and have helped to increase the number of Shi'i Muslims in Senegal.

== See also ==
- Islam in Senegal
- Religion in Senegal
- Mozdahir
- Lebanese people in Senegal
- Darou Hidjiratou
