= Vélingara =

- City and commune
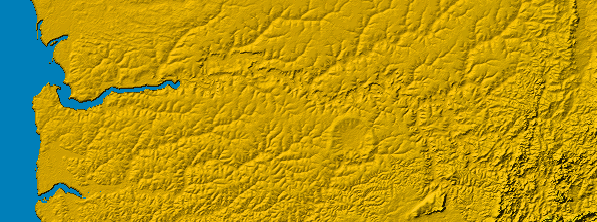
- Vélingara meteorite crater

- Location within Senegal
- Coordinates: 13°09′N 14°07′W
- Country: Senegal
- Region: Kolda Region
- Department: Vélingara

Area
  - City and commune: 16.18 km^{2} (6.25 sq mi)

Population (2023 census)
  - City and commune: 45,431
  - Density: 2,808/km^{2} (7,272/sq mi)
- Time zone: UTC+0 (GMT)

Vélingara is a city and urban commune situated in the Kolda Region of Senegal. It is located slightly north of the large 48 km Vélingara crater though the structure's impact origin is still unconfirmed.

The population is primarily composed of Fulani, Soninke, Wolof and Mandinka people. The population at the 2023 census was 45,431 an increase from the counted 32,161 in 2013.

== From foundation to the 1940s ==
Vélingara means "If it's good to live, come" in Fulani. The natural assets of this site certainly led Ali Niana Baldé, founder of the village, to settle there. Like the entire Fouladou region, this part was full of game and had fertile land for agriculture. This first village was founded around 1900. According to Elhadji Diao, born in Vélingara Fulbé around 1927, its foundation dates back to an earlier date, probably around 1870. Indeed, on a map of Fouladou from 1880 is mentioned a locality called Wélingara which is located in an area close to the location of the first village. Was it the village that later gave birth to the city?

In 1903, the French annexed Fouladou after Moussa Molo fled to the Gambia. Vélingara was then attached to the new canton of Patim Kandiaye. It was headed for a large part of the period by Yéro Moulaye Baldé, whose father, Alanso Koumbiry, was already under Moussa Molo at the head of a province of Fouladou. Under French rule, Vélingara developed gradually. It became a subdivision in 1924. One of the first subdivision chiefs, Poussy, was installed in 1931. Previously, the health and school infrastructure were put in place. The first school was opened in 1924, the first dispensary built in 1930.

Later, trading companies, including the Saloum and the Compagnie Française d'Afrique Occidentale (CFAO), set up there to collect groundnuts, which were increasingly cultivated by the Fulani.

The development of the village attracted people of various origins to Vélingara.

The first inhabitants, as we have seen, were Fulani. At that time, they were one of the majority groups of the population. They were concentrated in Fulbé, a village just two kilometres north-east of Vélingara Escale, the seat of the colonial administration. These Fulani, the country's original inhabitants, were animists, according to all those interviewed. There is an explanation for this slow development of Islam. Indeed, the Fouladou was the refuge of the Fulani who were refractory to Islam. Many of them settled there following the Muslim revolutions in Bundu, Macina and Fouta-Toro, which allowed the formation of Muslim theocracies. However, under Alpha Molo, Islam made progress, especially at the elite level. This revolution, led by slaves, was the one who embraced Islam in greater numbers while the nobles remained faithful to their ancient beliefs.

These Fulani were later joined by Mandinka from the Gaabu. Islam developed at the beginning of the twentieth century with the massive arrival of these Gaabunke under the leadership of the Toucouleur marabout Al Hajj Aali Caam. The inhabitants of Gaabu were fleeing the Portuguese colonial regime, which was harsher than that of the French. The marabout mentioned with his talibés founded many villages, including Madina Gounass. But the Gaabu Muslims present in Vélingara were Mandingos from Bijini. It was a Moricounda, that is, a village of marabouts under the domination of the Gaabu. Among these Mandingos of Vélingara, tradition has retained two names: that of Sagna Ba Samang and Abou Samang. The former was later chosen as imam of the mosque of Vélingara by Chérif Bécaye, father of Chérif Samsidine AÏdara.

Other foreign Muslim minorities lived in Vélingara. These were Sarakolés, notably the Soumboundou and Peulhs of Fouta-Djalon, including Ceerno Moustapha Barry and Ceerno Mouminy Ba. The latter were mainly devoted to the teaching of the Qur'an in those early days in Velingara.

Some of the members of this community came from Fouta-Toro. This is the case of Racine Djiguo and Ceerno Mouminy Bâ. This small group of Muslims in the midst of animist Fulani will grow slowly with the arrival of new workers on behalf of the French companies present there.

As a result, the Muslim community began to organize itself under the leadership of Chérif Bécaye Aïdara. He appointed the first Imam Sagna Ba Samang, who chose the location of the first mosque and demarcated it.

== Geography ==
As the crow flies, the nearest localities are Diourourou, Kadialin, Badimbour, Kampoto, Bounkiling, Kouadi Bainouk, Kandialon and Maniora Mandingue.

Dakar, the capital, is 570 km away.

== Geological physics ==
About twelve kilometres south of Vélingara there is a crater with a diameter of 48 km, probably due to a meteorite impact.

This phenomenon was not known until 1999. It was discovered thanks to NASA satellite images.

== Population ==
The population is mainly composed of Fulani, Soninke, Wolof, and Mandingo.

In the 1988 and 2002 censuses, Vélingara had 14,068 and 20,806 inhabitants respectively. In 2007, the population was officially estimated at 23,775.

== Economy ==
It is a rural town that lives mainly from the trade of local agricultural products.

== Culture ==
In 2007, Vélingara organised for the first time intercultural days, the International Festival of the Carrefour (FESICAR).

In this vein, a Cultural Weekend will be organized by the Chérif Samsidine Aidara high school and the Departmental Council of Vélingara on May 15, 16 and 17, 2015. On this occasion, two lectures on Pan-Africanism and on the life of Nelson Mandela were led by specialists.

In 2013 we participated in the largest cultural competition for young artists in the locality called Vélingara Jeunes Talents (VJT) which is held every year.

== Notable people born in Vélingara ==
Chérif Mohamed Aly Aïdara, founder of the NGO Institut Mozdahir International (IMI)2

Mamadou Baldé, footballer

Sanghé Mballo, Public Works Engineer, Former Minister

Amadou Beye Balde, former deputy mayor of Velingara

Elhadji Souma Baldé, a former young member of the council led by Mamadou Dia, who is also a member of the BDS at the age of 89... in 2001 president of the PDS federation of the department

The late Elhadji Diao, Deputy Secretary General of the local PDS, who is also Director General of the #PROMER

the late Elhadji Pape Maissa Diop, former Member of Parliament, Secretary General of the PDS

Aliou Sow, former Director General of the National Youth Council under the Wade regime, Director General of the #Sapco

Ibrahima Barry Dianwando, tax inspector and Rufisque estate, founder of the #RCD also a member of the presidential mobility under Macky

Aminata Diao Baldé, one of the youngest deputies in Senegal's 13th legislature, member of Macky Sall's APR party (PR)

Amadou Woury Diallo, current mayor of the commune of Vélingara for his third term, also a member of the APR

Habibou Niang, cultural actor, radio and TV host (Manoore Fm, Origines Fm, 2stv, Urban Fm)

Alpha Bocar Baldé, Director General of SODAGRI, 1st Vice-President of the Departmental Council of Vélingara

Mrs. Fatoumata Sabaly, economic operator, large agricultural producer and breeder in the Anambé Basin

Assane Guindo Balde, 1st Deputy Mayor of Velingara, son of the former Deputy Mayor of Velingara who died in June 2017

== Climate ==
Climate data for Velingara (1991–2020)
Month	Jan	Feb	Mar	Apr	May	Jun	Jul	Aug	Sep	Oct	Nov	Dec	Year
Mean daily maximum °C (°F)	35.1 (95.2)	37.7 (99.9)	39.9 (103.8)	41.0 (105.8)	40.5 (104.9)	37.0 (98.6)	33.2 (91.8)	32.0 (89.6)	32.4 (90.3)	34.3 (93.7)	35.8 (96.4)	35.1 (95.2)	36.2 (97.2)
Mean daily minimum °C (°F)	16.2 (61.2)	18.1 (64.6)	21.1 (70.0)	23.0 (73.4)	24.6 (76.3)	24.7 (76.5)	22.9 (73.2)	22.3 (72.1)	22.2 (72.0)	22.2 (72.0)	18.2 (64.8)	15.9 (60.6)	21.0 (69.8)
Record low °C (°F)	8.5 (47.3)	7.5 (45.5)	11.4 (52.5)	9.7 (49.5)	11.0 (51.8)	16.3 (61.3)	12.2 (54.0)	12.4 (54.3)	11.1 (52.0)	12.5 (54.5)	9.8 (49.6)	9.0 (48.2)	7.5 (45.5)
Average precipitation mm (inches)	0.1 (0.00)	0.3 (0.01)	0.0 (0.0)	0.1 (0.00)	14.9 (0.59)	94.1 (3.70)	189.8 (7.47)	287.5 (11.32)	235.6 (9.28)	65.2 (2.57)	2.3 (0.09)	1.0 (0.04)	890.9 (35.07)
Average precipitation days (≥ 1.0 mm)	0.0	0.0	0.0	0.0	1.2	6.1	11.7	16.1	14.4	4.8	0.2	0.1	54.6
Source: NOAA

== See also ==
- List of possible impact structures on Earth
