= Vélingara department =

Coordinates: 13°9′00″N 14°7′00″W

Vélingara
- Department
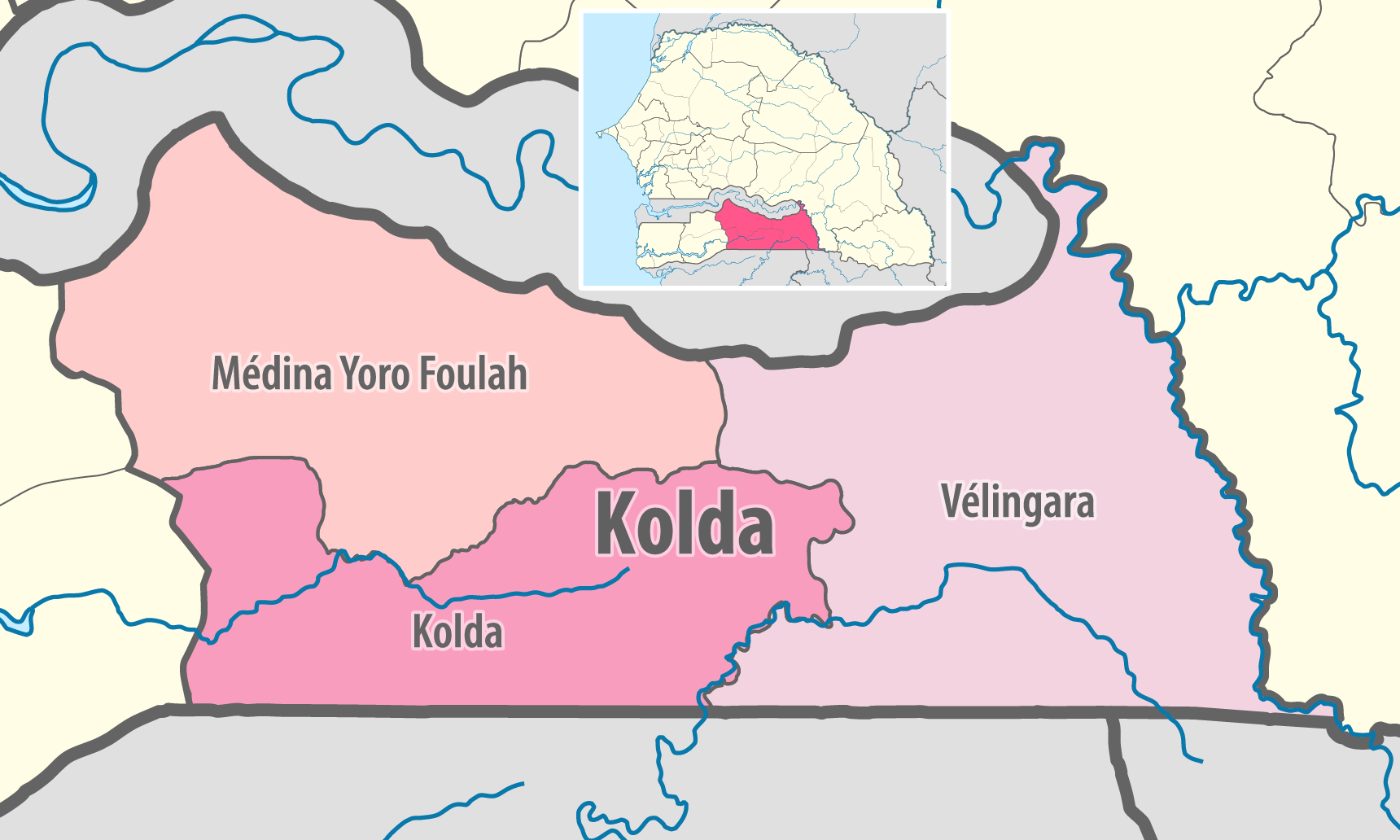
- Location in the Kolda region
- Country: Senegal
- Region: Kolda region
- Capital: Vélingara

Area
  - Total: 5,434 km^{2} (2,098 sq mi)

Population (2023 census)
  - Total: 406,504
  - Density: 74.81/km^{2} (193.8/sq mi)
- Time zone: UTC+0 (GMT)

Vélingara department is one of the 46 departments of Senegal, one of the three making up the Kolda region in the Upper Casamance.

== Administration ==
The department has three communes: Vélingara (the capital town), Kounkané and Diaobé-Kabendou.

The rural districts (communautés rurales) comprise:

- Bonconto Arrondissement
  - Bonconto (Bonkonto)
  - Linkéring
  - Médina Gounass
  - Sinthiang Koundara
- Pakour Arrondissement
  - Pakour
  - Paroumba
  - Ouassadou
- Saré Coly Sallé Arrondissement
  - Saré Coly Sallé
  - Kandia
  - Kandiaye
  - Némataba

== Population ==
In the December 2002 census, the population was 189,742. In 2005, it was estimated at 206,547 people. The 2023 census counted a population of 405,151.

== Historical site ==
- Village of Payoungou, arrondissement of Pakour

== Notable people ==
- Cherif Mohamed Aly Aidara, founder of the NGO Mozdahir International Institute
