= Sédhiou region =

Region of Senegal

Sédhiou region Région de Sédhiou (French) Diiwaanu Séeju (Wolof)
- Region
- Location of Sédhiou in Senegal

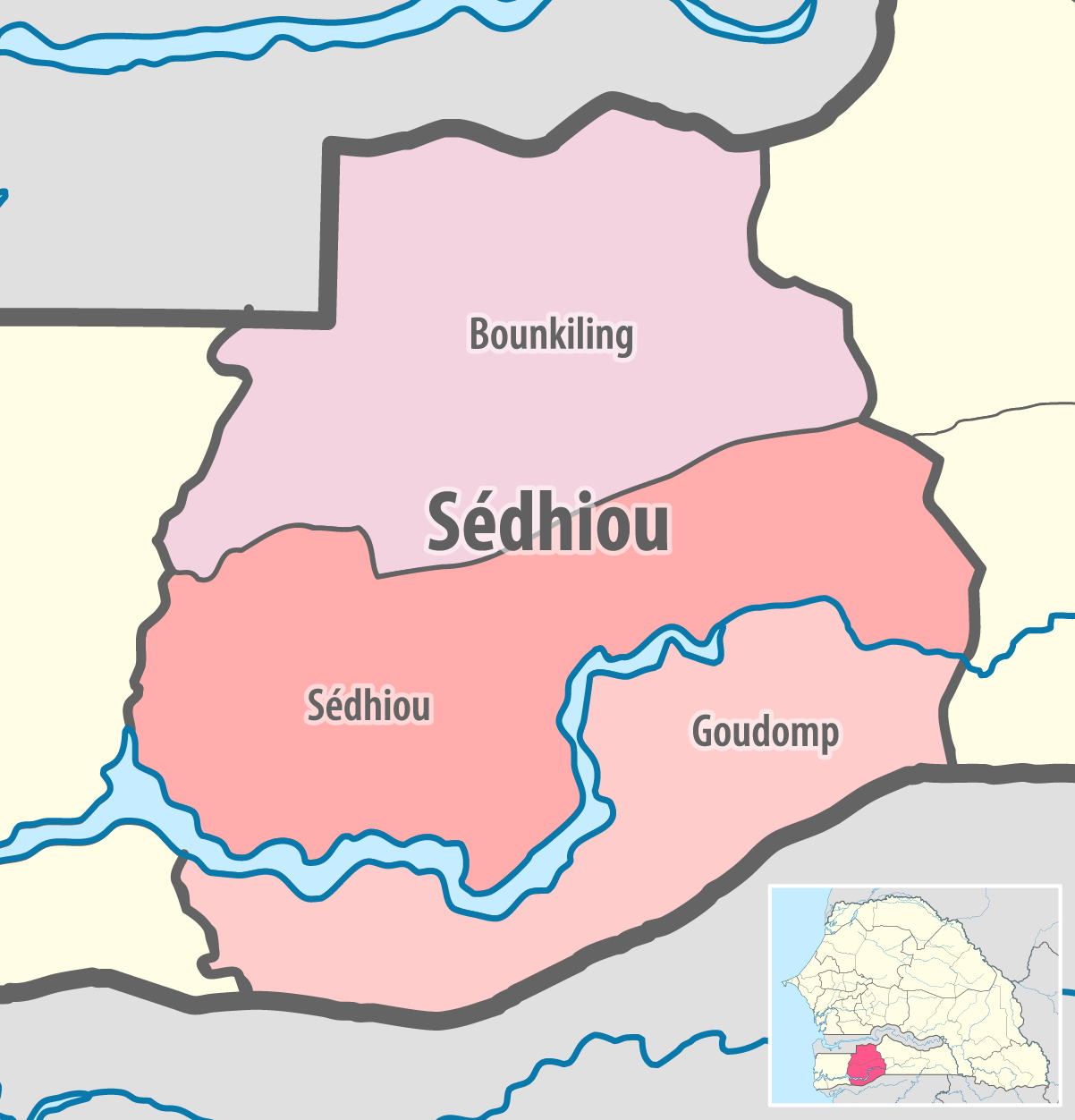
- Sédhiou région, divided into 3 departments
- Coordinates: 12°42′N 15°33′W
- Country: Senegal
- Established: 2008
- Capital: Sédhiou
- Départements: List: Bounkiling department; Goudomp department; Sédhiou department

Government
  - Governor: Cheikh Kane Niane

Area
  - Total: 7,341 km^{2} (2,834 sq mi)

Population (2023 census)
  - Total: 590,784
  - Density: 80.48/km^{2} (208.4/sq mi)
- Time zone: UTC+0 (GMT)

Sédhiou region (retroactively called Middle Casamance) is a region of Senegal located in the southwest of the country in the natural region called Casamance.

It was historically a department of the Kolda region until 2008.

It is located between the Kolda region in the east and the Ziguinchor region in the west. It also shares borders with the Gambia in the north and Guinea-Bissau in the south.

== Departments ==
Sédhiou region has three departments:

- Bounkiling département
- Goudoump département
- Sédhiou département
