= Mozdahir =

International non-governmental organization

Mozdahir International Institute Institut international de Mozdahir
- Founded: 2000; 26 years ago
- Founded at: Dakar, Senegal
- Type: International non-governmental organization
- Purpose: Sustainable development agriculture education
- Headquarters: Dakar, Senegal
- Region served: West Africa
- Director: Cherif Mohamed Aly Aidara
- Website: mozdahir.sn

Mozdahir (also known as the Mozdahir International Institute; French name: Institut Mozdahir International, IMI or Institut international de Mozdahir) is an international non-governmental organization based in Dakar, Senegal.

== Overview ==
It has branches in different African countries, such as Senegal, Mali, Ivory Coast, Guinea Bissau, Burkina Faso, and other countries. Mozdahir was founded in 2000 by Cherif Mohamed Aly Aidara, one of the main Shi'i religious leaders of Senegal. The NGO works on development projects relating to education, health, agriculture, environment, reforestation, and solar energy, and has partnered with other major NGOs such as the World Food Programme.

Mozdahir is headquartered in Dakar, near the University of Dakar's campus. The NGO's main campus in Dakar includes a library and educational facilities. Mozdahir also has a quarterly magazine, regularly hosts conferences, and hosts a radio station called Mozdahir FM 93.2 in Guédiawaye, Dakar, which is the only Shi'i radio station currently being broadcast in Senegal. It carries out many development projects in the Casamance region of southern Senegal, as well as in various parts of West Africa. The organization manages diverse rural development projects, including the creation of new banana plantations in villages such as Nadjaf Al Ashraf.

== Projects ==
To date, Mozdahir has built:

- Lycées in Bamako, Mali and Ouagadougou, Burkina Faso
- CAPE Maimouna Diao orphanage in Kolda, Senegal
- Al Mahdi School, a private school in Kolda, Senegal
- an Islamic center in Bafatá, Guinea Bissau
- a cultural center in Vélingara, Senegal
- new forests in Kolda Region, southern Senegal and Thiès Region, western Senegal

== See also ==
- Agriculture in Senegal
- Shia Islam in Senegal
