= Kolda region =

Region of Senegal

Kolda region Région de Kolda (French) Diiwaanu Koldaa (Wolof)
- Region
- Location of Kolda in Senegal

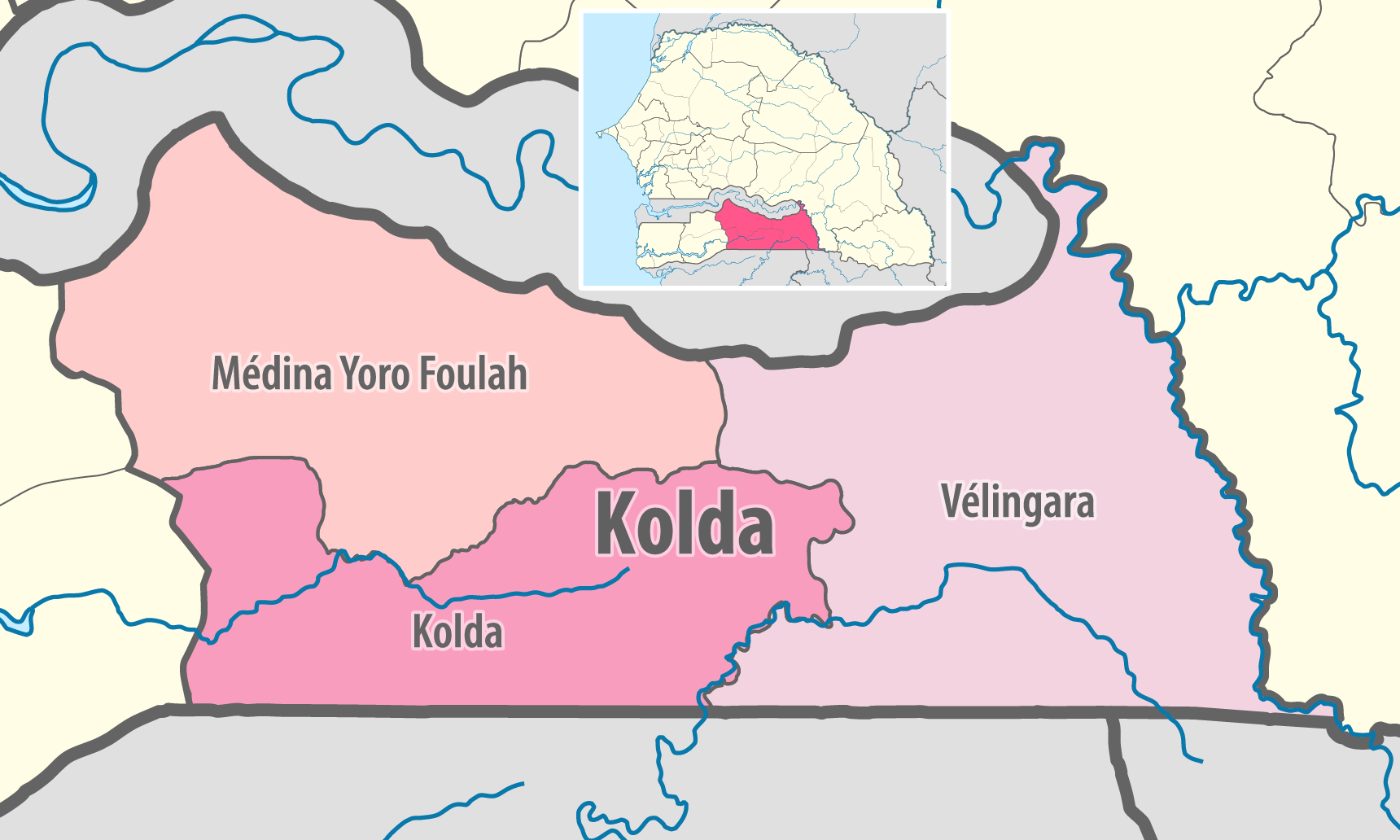
- Kolda région, divided into three départements
- Coordinates: 13°05′N 14°49′W
- Country: Senegal
- Capital: Kolda
- Départements: List: Kolda; Médina Yoro Foulah; Vélingara

Area
  - Total: 13,771 km^{2} (5,317 sq mi)

Population (2023 census)
  - Total: 916,513
  - Density: 66.554/km^{2} (172.37/sq mi)
- Time zone: UTC+0 (GMT)
- HDI (2017): 0.443 low · 7th

Kolda is a region of Senegal (regional capitals have the same name as their respective regions). It is also referred to historically and popularly as Haute Casamance.

It is one of the 14 regions of the country and is located in the south. It shares borders with Guinea, Guinea-Bissau, The Gambia and its fellow regions of Sédhiou and Tambacounda.

== Departments ==
Kolda region is divided into three departments:

- Kolda département
- Médina Yoro Foulah département
- Vélingara département

== Notable people ==
- Mamadou Baldé (b. 1985), former professional footballer
- Cheikh Sabaly (b. 1999), professional footballer
