= Dodji =

- Town
- Location within Senegal
- Coordinates: 15°31′N 14°56′W
- Country: Senegal
- Region: Louga Region
- Time zone: UTC+0 (GMT)

Dodji is a town in north central Senegal. with a 2007 estimated population of 8,281. It is in the Louga Region, Linguère Department, and the Dodji Arrondissement, which consists of the communauté rurales of Dodji, Labgar, and Ouarkhokh. Though a separate administrative unit, Dodji falls under the Commune of Dahra - Linguère. As of 2007, Dodji's highest administrative official, (Président de Communauté Rurale) is Math Coueladio Ba, formerly of the Senegalese Socialist Party, now allied to the ruling PDS.

Dodji Airport is a 1,600 metres (5,200 ft) long sand landing strip.

== History ==
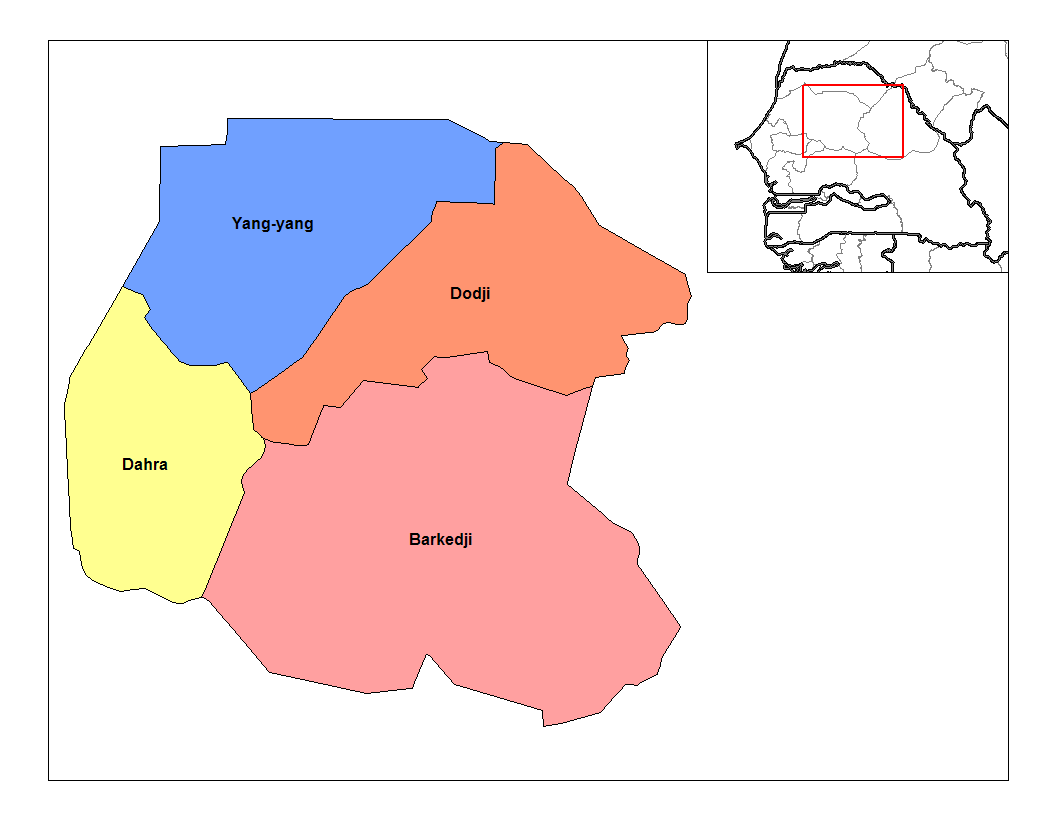
Dodji Arrondissement (orange) in Linguère Department.

Dodji is situated in a semi-arid savanna zone, with few permanent settlements until the decades before the Second World War. The town was founded by young Wolof members of the Mouride brotherhood. Many previously uninhabited areas in eastern Senegal were settled and communities established as part of the movement's drive to find land and livelihood for Senegal's population. Dodji's isolation is evinced by the deportation of strike leaders from Dakar to the town after a general strike called by the Dakar branch of the Union Nationale des Travailleurs du Sénégal (UNTS) in May 1963. The area around Dodji, historically very sparsely populated, has also been used by the French military as a live fire training ground.

== Development ==
The town receives 250–300 millimetres (10–12 in) of rainfall annually, so most agriculture is limited to pastoralism, although peanut cultivation, predominating in the west, has been transplanted here. Cattle herding has been plagued by drought and problems with access to silage in the region, although the later problem appears less severe in Dodji. Attempts to aid farming have come domestically and internationally, as well as from local organizations such as the Association pour le Développement de Dodji et Yang-Yang (ADYD). The national government has recently completed a 5 km by 10 km, 15 billion liter reservoir for local farmers, and a number of international food security projects use Dodji as a local base. The entire region has also been plagued by dry season fires in recent years.
