= Maka-Yop Arrondissement =

Maka-Yop
- Arrondissement
- Interactive map of Maka-Yop
- Country: Senegal
- Region: Kaffrine Region
- Department: Koungheul Department
- Time zone: UTC+0 (GMT)

Maka-Yop Arrondissement is an arrondissement of the Koungheul Department in the Kaolack Region of Senegal.

== Subdivisions ==
The arrondissement is divided administratively into rural communities and in turn into villages.
