= Healthcare in Senegal =

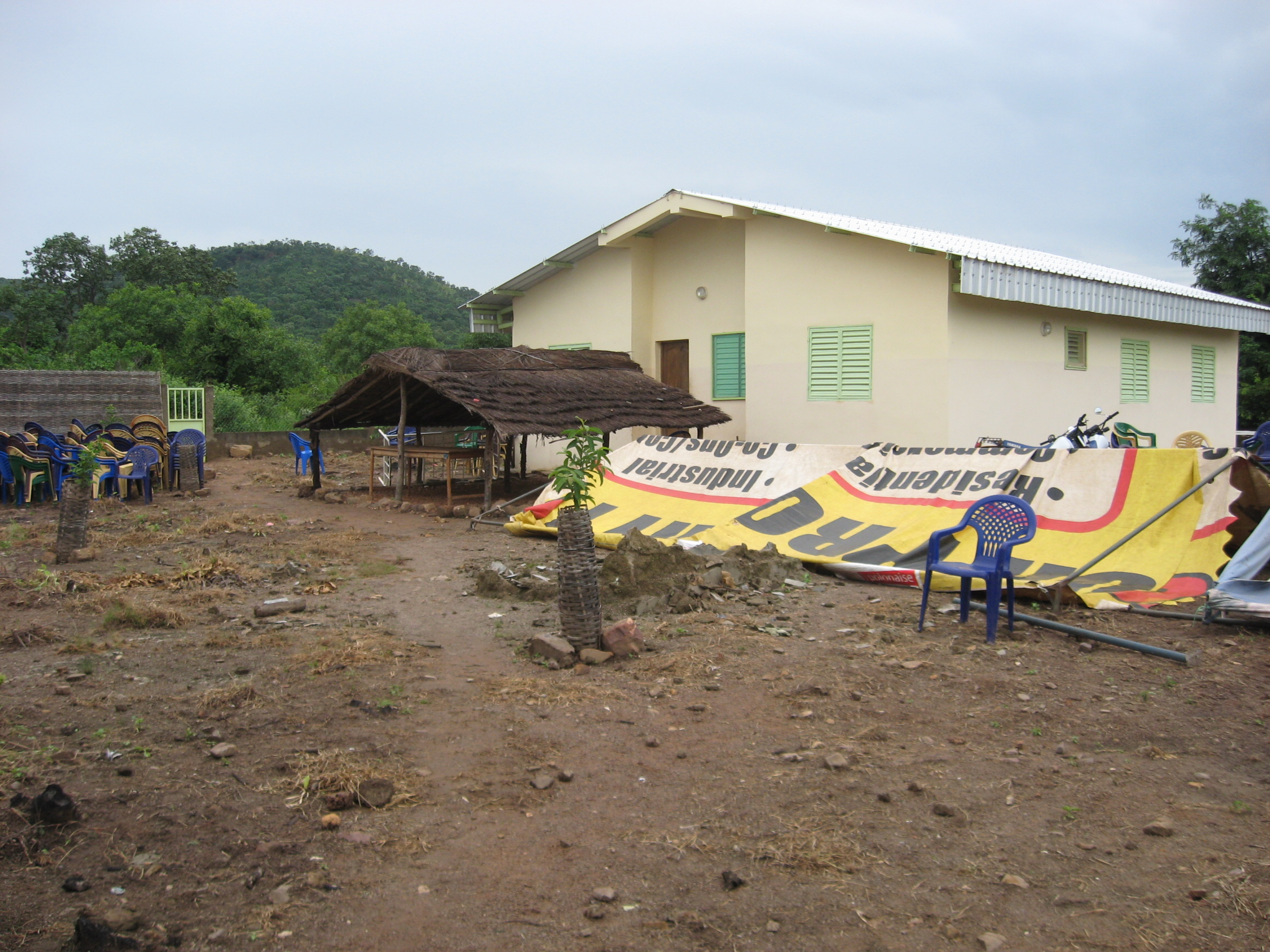
Dimboli Health Post (Kédougou region, September 2009

Healthcare in Senegal is a center topic of discourse in understanding the well-being and vitality of the Senegalese people. As of 2008, there was a need to improve Senegal's infrastructure to promote a healthy, decent living environment for the Senegalese.

Additionally, the country needs more doctors and health personnel, particularly general practitioners, gynecologists, obstetricians, pediatricians, pulmonologist, and cardiologists. In fact, Senegal has seven doctors per 100,000 citizens, while 32% of rural citizens have no access to medical care at all. Moreover, there is a strong need to have more of these personnel in rural areas: in 2008, Senegal had only twenty full-fledged hospitals, seven of which are in Dakar.

From approximately 1905 to the present, there have been significant shifts in Senegal's healthcare system, the system's structures, specific diseases that are problematic in Senegal, as well as issues affecting women and children and access to healthcare in the country. As of 2019, there were 1,347 medical facilities, including 20 major hospitals.

== History ==
As is the case in the rest of the African continent, the Senegalese have long used traditional medicines and rely on traditional healers for their ailments. During the colonial era, the health care system was drastically changed. In 1905, France laid the foundation for health policy in the area, though primarily to serve the French colonial officials and not the native Senegalese. Imperialist extraction from African colonies meant that the health care infrastructure was primarily constructed in large, coastal cities such as Dakar. Infrastructure in rural areas was largely left out of the picture. Later in 1905, Medical Assistance for the Indigenous was created. It was responsible for providing free medical care and health advice to indigenous peoples, promoting immunization, and promoting maternal and child health. After the Second World War, international public opinion became more critical of colonial policy, and comprehensive programs were put in place to fight against major diseases. Since its independence from France, Senegal has become more involved in major international programs for development and health. Some historians argue that the commoditization and commercialization of healthcare, moving from the colonial to the post-colonial era, has reduced health care to a convenience that is only available to the wealthy, with those in dire poverty often unable to access care. As a result of the development of health care infrastructure in the colonial era by the French, access remains very uneven across regions and between income levels.

== Organization of the health care system ==
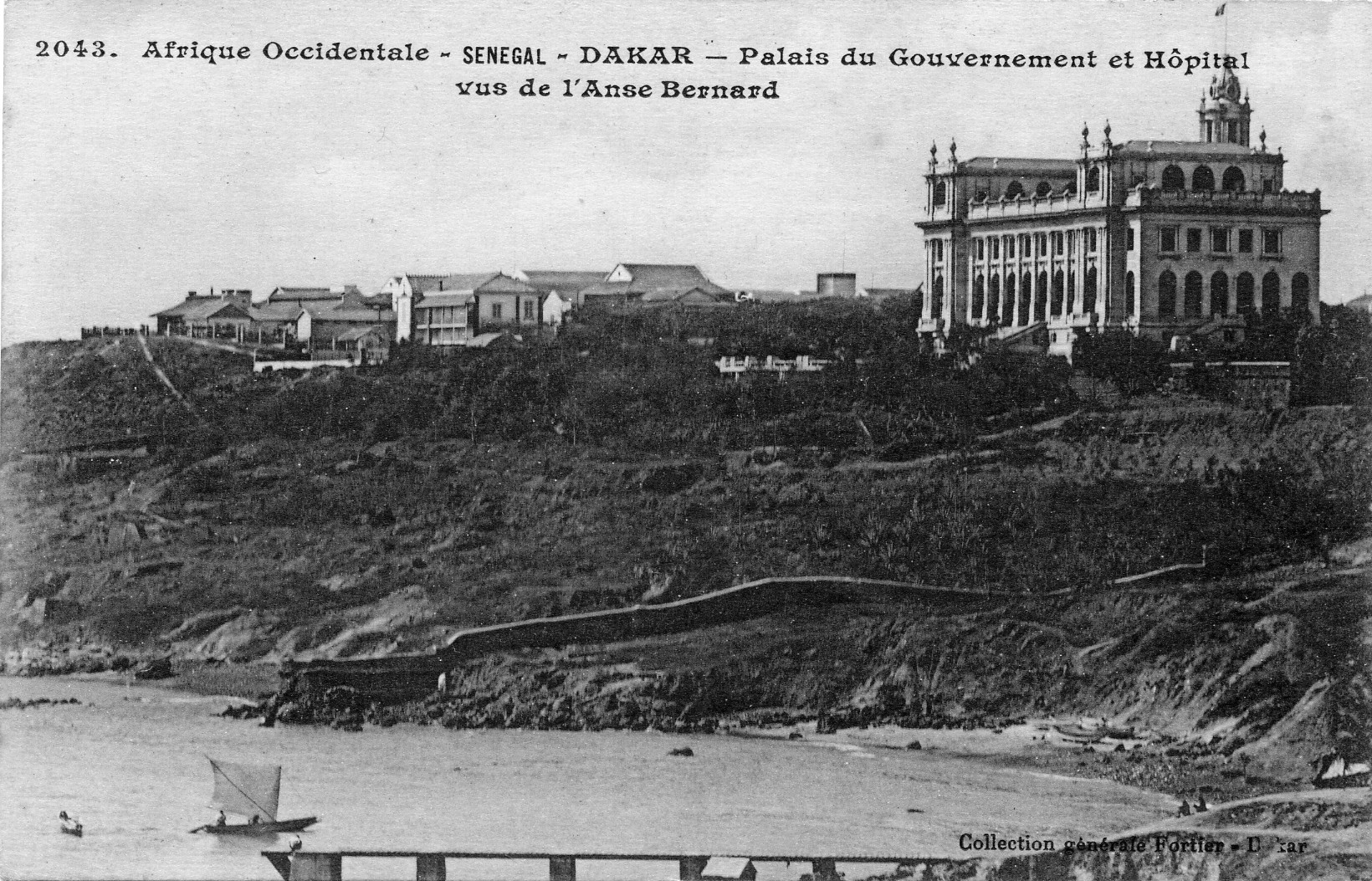
Dakar Government Palace and Hospital, circa 1920.

Senegal's health system is pyramidal, with three main parts: a central level, a regional level, and a peripheral level. The central level contains the minister's office, branches, and related services. The regional level is known as the "medical region", an administrative region that addresses healthcare services within a given region. The peripheral level is known as the "health district", with each district having at least one health center and a network of smaller centers.

The national health system is divided into three levels: regional hospitals, district health centers, and health posts. Rural health care is divided into three parts: health centers, health posts, and health points. Health centers are at the top, with one to two medical doctors and 15-20 people as part of the health staff. Health posts are below these, with four or five health workers. At the lowest level are health points, which house one or two health agents and a midwife. The system has been the subject of much criticism, especially because of the increasing demands of profitability and the corruption in this part of the government as in other domains of public life.

=== Hospitals ===

In 2019, there were 1,347 medical facilities in Senegal, including 13 regional hospitals, 5 national hospitals and two university hospitals. The largest number of hospitals was in the Dakar Region.

In 2021, four new hospitals were established in Touba, Kaffrine, Kédougou and Sédhiou.

Hospitals in Senegal
Name	Region	Type Hospital	Coordinates	Ref
Abass Ndao University Hospital Center	Dakar Region	University hospital center	14.6849985°N 17.454746399°W	
Albert Royer National Hospital Center	Dakar Region	National hospital center	14.6931815895173°N 17.4650645256042°W	
Amadou Dieuguene Regional Hospital	Thiès Region	Regional hospital	14.7521°N 16.9145°W	
Aristide Le Dantec Hospital Center	Dakar Region	National hospital center	14.65735°N 17.43672°W	
De Syllacounda Hospital	Kédougou Region	Hospital	12.721029114581958°N 12.123975817554232°W	
Elisabeth Diouf de Rufisque Hospital	Dakar Region	Hospital	14.715°N 17.28°W	
Fann University Hospital Center	Dakar Region	University hospital center	14.6929°N 17.46621°W	
Fatick Regional Hospital	Fatick Region	Regional hospital	14.3280309853688°N 16.4041972160339°W	
Grand Yoff General Hospital	Dakar Region	General hospital	14.731667°N 17.444722°W	
Kaffrine Regional Hospital	Kaffrine Region	Regional hospital	14.099°N 15.557°W	
Kaolack Regional Hospital	Kaolack Region	Regional hospital	14.1825°N 16.2533°W	
Kolda Regional Hospital	Kolda Region	Regional hospital	12.8928091142872°N 14.9407732486724°W	
La Paix Hospital	Ziguinchor Region	Hospital	12.5686028°N 16.2761°W	
Louga Regional Hospital	Louga Region	Regional hospital	15.62266°N 16.22008°W	
Lubke Regional Hospital	Diourbel Region	Regional hospital	14.6434239°N 16.232144°W	
Maguette Lo Hospital	Louga Region	Hospital	15.4370399°N 15.21948079°W	
Matam Regional Hospital	Matam Region	Regional hospital	15.659878°N 13.261768°W	
Matlaboul Fawzaïni Hospital Center	Diourbel Region	National hospital center	14.858285°N 15.908856°W	
Military Hospital of Ouakum	Dakar Region	Military hospital	14.716819224276515°N 17.48296624743821°W	
Ndamatou Hospital	Diourbel Region	Hospital	14.8584398469°N 15.8627434974°W	
Ndioum Regional Hospital	Saint-Louis Region	Regional hospital	16.5129°N 14.6471°W	
Ouroussogui Hospital	Matam Region	Hospital	15.6036959°N 13.3303938°W	
Pikine Centre National Hospital	Dakar Region	National hospital center	14.74873°N 17.38874°W	
Principal Hospital	Dakar Region	National hospital center, Military hospital	14.661344°N 17.43477°W	
Roi Baudoin Hospital	Dakar Region	Hospital	14.7737465°N 17.38430859°W	
Saint-Louis Regional Hospital	Saint-Louis Region	Regional hospital	16.023023°N 16.505927°W	
Sedhiou Regional Hospital	Sédhiou Region	Regional hospital	12.704604°N 15.55623°W	
Tambacounda Regional Hospital	Tambacounda Region	Regional hospital	13.7788623°N 13.6736359°W	
Tivaouane Hospital	Thiès Region	Hospital	14.949584°N 16.813847°W	
Youssou Mbargane Diop Hospital	Dakar Region	Hospital	14.7262171°N 17.2597°W	
Ziguinchor Regional Hospital	Ziguinchor Region	Regional hospital	12.558208°N 16.282158°W	

=== Financing care ===
In 1999, 53% of health funding came from the government, 11% from individuals, 6% from communities, and 30% from international partners. Of a household's health expenditures, 89% is out-of-pocket spending while 11% is in the form of health insurance contributions. Additionally, only 15.2% of Senegalese people have health insurance, most of whom work in the formal sector. On average, a facility charges US$2.90 for inpatient care for the median length of stay (five days), US$0.43 for adult outpatient care, and US$0.24 for children's outpatient care. In terms of expanding health insurance, it seems that policies that will reduce the negative effect of the time lost to seek care by workers, or policies that will increase the accessibility and the quality of care, will be more effective to increase health care utilization than would the introduction of health insurance to those who do not yet have it. A study assessing health policy in Senegal concluded that government institutions should play a central role in "all stages of the policy process" and should implement "defined policies"; the study recommended focusing more on efforts to implement existing policies, instead of voting new laws without follow through.

== Changes to health care strategies ==
=== Bamako Initiative ===
One of the most influential pieces to the transformation of Senegal's healthcare system in the late 1990s was the Bamako Initiative. The Bamako Initiative started in 1987, when health ministers from two dozen African countries met with representatives of WHO and UNICEF to discuss the limited success of health care strategies in Africa and the need for intervention. At the conference, leaders agreed to provide a minimum of health care services with severely reduced social services budgets. As a result of the meeting, major changes to Senegal's health system occurred. The meeting resulted in the decentralization of Senegal's health sector, which some critics believe has brought about chaos in local governments and administration in Senegal.

The Bamako Initiative also led to the establishment of health committees in Senegal in 1992. The committees strive to meet three central goals: to promote health of their community, to mobilize the community around health development, and to improve the quality of services rendered at their health post, clinic, or hospital. In practice, the committees have not been completely representative, and have become problematic to clinic staff and medical personnel. Women have been almost entirely absent from committee elections and seldom are selected for committee boards. Rather, these boards are held by males who may ignore the needs of women, children, and the disadvantaged in their committees. Critics believe the committees have been characterized by mismanagement, mistrust, and a lack of transparency. Despite these issues, there have been significant gains from the Bamako Initiative and health committees. The changes have led to the improved availability of pharmaceuticals, and have also made up for the shortage of health personnel in many instances.

=== Decentralization ===
Decentralization began in the late 1990s, following the Bamako initiative. The key goal has been to make the state more responsive and adaptable to local and regional needs, as opposed to when administrative power and responsibility were concentrated more centrally. This has resulted in more accountability and real power on part of local officials. The state funds a significant portion of the local health budget, but health targets, goals, and interventions are determined at the local level. However, because most local officials have no training on how decentralization should work; there has been a vacuum in terms of planning and management, and weak institutional capacity and the few resources to allocate among increasing responsibilities have exacerbated issues. Decentralization has failed in two major ways: the first three years failed to render politics and local government more participatory and more responsive to local communities, and there has been no attention to gender equality and participation. Decentralization has meant that authorities have completely failed to engage with women's situations and concerns. There have been additional issues in creating conflicts between city officials and medical district officers over disbursement of money for the health sector.

=== Privatization ===
In addition to changes with the Bamako Initiative and decentralization, Senegalese healthcare has become privatized. Privatization in Senegal has meant that user fees and the sales of pharmaceuticals finance a significant part of the health sector. The state still funds the health sector by paying salaries of state employees and giving each district a discretionary budget each year that it decides. However, user fees and pharmaceutical sales are only the most evident parts of the privatized health system in Senegal. Now, patients must buy a ticket to stand in line and receive care at a health clinic, which can be particularly problematic for mothers, the elderly, and the poorest of the poor. Moreover, hospitals require even more available cash. The effects of privatization in have especially disadvantaged women, because they typically manage the health of the household. Additionally, many preventable deaths have occurred as a direct result of privatization.

=== Digitalization ===
In June 2021, Senegal's Agency for Universal Health launched sunucmu.com (SunuCMU), a website that the agency hopes will streamline health care in the country. The website is a part of the Minister of State Mohammad Abdallah Dionne's plan for digitalization. He aims to make Senegal's health care system effective and sustainable. Using SunuCMU, Senegal hopes to achieve 75 percent coverage within two years of the launch.

The website shows four clear initiatives:

- Caesarean Initiative: The Caesarean Initiative seeks to provide better health care for pregnant women and their fetuses and newborn babies.
- The Sesame Plan: The Sesame Plan seeks to provide adequate and cheap medical coverage for all those who are 60-years-old and older.
- The Dialysis Plan: The Dialysis Plan seeks to provide medical coverage for all those with renal (Kidney) failure, whether it be endgame or acute.
- The Zero to 5 Plan: The Zero to Five Plan seeks to provide medical coverage for all infants and young children.

== Health care utilization ==
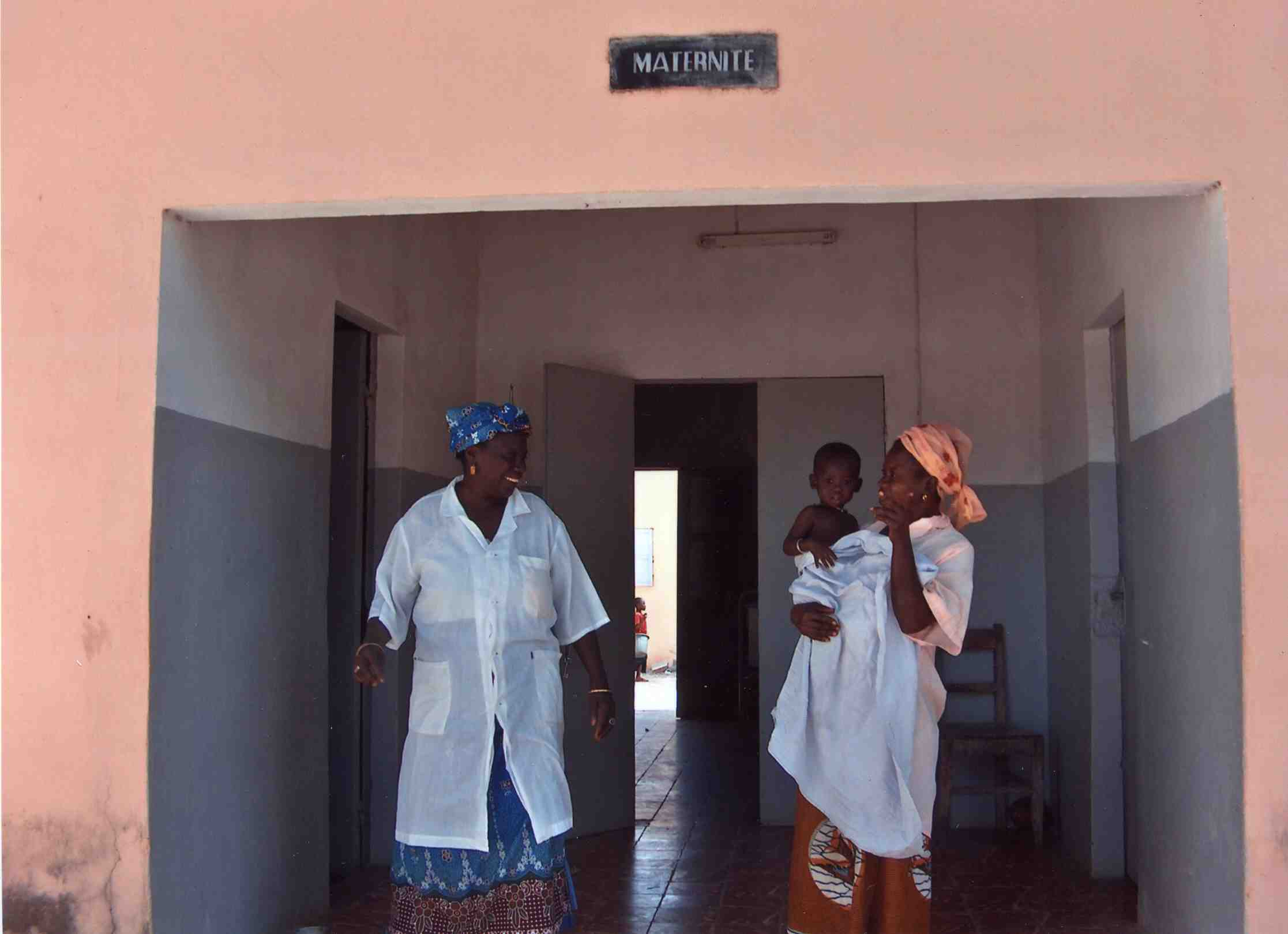
Two women and an infant at a maternity ward on Niodior Island, Sine Saloum, Senegal (January 2006).

Health care utilization in Senegal has been shaped by a variety of factors. Women have a greater likelihood of using care than men by 1.4 percentage points. At the individual level, the likelihood of seeking treatment is influenced by the relationship to the head of the household, employment status, gender, and age. It has been found that wealthier people are also more likely to use care by 8 percentage points than the poorest. Moreover, workers who belong to households that require a high load of farm work are less likely to seek care by 7.5 percentage points than the non-workers of households with a low agricultural work requirement.

=== Barriers to healthcare and medicine ===
The implementation and spread of healthcare and medicine in Senegal is slow and faces barriers. Some of the greatest barriers to health care utilization include lack of information, lack of communication, low number of health care workers, social and religious barriers, and overreliance on traditional medicine. According to a study done in 2017, 97.7% of households were not visiting a dentist annually. Only 25% of households consult a dentist when in pain, compared to 37% using traditional medicine as their first response to oral illnesses; the study found that bigger households (> 5 members) tended to rely more on traditional medicine when facing oral pain. There is currently, there is a strong need for strategies to empower and better support the knowledge role of health coordinators and supervisors. Additionally, the lack of access to current, relevant information by health professionals and decision-makers in Senegal has been problematic. Moreover, health workers desire information on ways to motivate men's involvement in reproductive health and to address rumors and religious barriers to family planning, which have hindered women's health care utilization.

Healthcare providers are trying to raise the awareness of the population on modern medicine and its implication. Research has focused on the relationship between doctors and patients in Senegal, and its impact on medical outcomes. An anthropological study seeking to identify barriers to an effective TB control in Senegal showed that one of the main reasons why TB is underdiagnosed is because of poor-quality information given by healthcare providers to their patients. Another study seeking for ways to improve adherence to TB treatment in the country showed that "improving patients counseling and communication, […] and reinforcement of supervision activities led to improvement in patient outcomes." Thus, a good communication between doctors and patients is needed. Researchers examine how the role and actions of patients impacts the quality of care they receive. After analyzing TB patients and the way healthcare providers consulted them, the study found that doctors were 27% more likely to diagnose the disease correctly when patients shared more information. Healthcare providers should also be trained on how to present medicine to a person who has never been in contact with modern medicine. Better health outcomes in Senegal, research suggests, is obtained when the relationship between healthcare providers and patients is based on the sharing of information, care, and trust. This relationship will make patients more active during consultations and allow them to receive better treatments.

Some Senegalese people, particularly in rural areas, face inadequate access to medicines and prescriptions. Improving access to medicine is a priority in developing nations like Senegal. In 2001, Senegal had only 520 pharmacies (1 per 18,320 people) and 731 health centers (1 per 13,032 people). Most of the population rely on traditional medicine without the use of modern drugs and access to medicine in Senegal may be limited in three main areas: inadequate supply of drugs, including critical drugs missing in health centers and pharmacies; insufficient health infrastructures to cover needs of the entire population; and high costs of drugs, which are sometimes higher than the minimum price, which can be problematic for the poorest of the poor.

=== Disparities between rural and urban areas ===
Major disparities exist in health care access for those living in urban versus rural areas. Approximately 70% of doctors and 80% of pharmacists and dentists are located in Dakar, the capital city. However, only 42% of the Senegalese population lives in urban areas, such as Dakar, which means that few doctors are available to rural residents. Of every 10,000 women who give birth, 24 will die in urban areas, but nearly 100 will die in rural areas. Additionally, there are major disparities in children's nutrition in urban versus rural areas, with those in rural areas being more heavily disadvantaged. Therefore, great attention may be placed on narrowing the gap between urban and rural healthcare access.

Narrowing the gap between rural and urban areas is done by training and attracting health professionals to remote areas. Physicians, nurses, and midwives require special training on how to work with patients who have never been in contact with modern medicine and have not learned modern health-seeking behaviors. Health workers would endure better and for longer periods in remote areas of the country if they were offered permanent contracts and better equipment. The "Plan Cobra" project was launched in 2006, and was a government effort to attract health professionals to underserved areas by hiring them under annual government contracts which offer them greater stability. Research also suggest that annual contracts may not be as effective in the long run, because workers do not stay in those regions after the end of their contract.

=== Transportation to health facilities ===
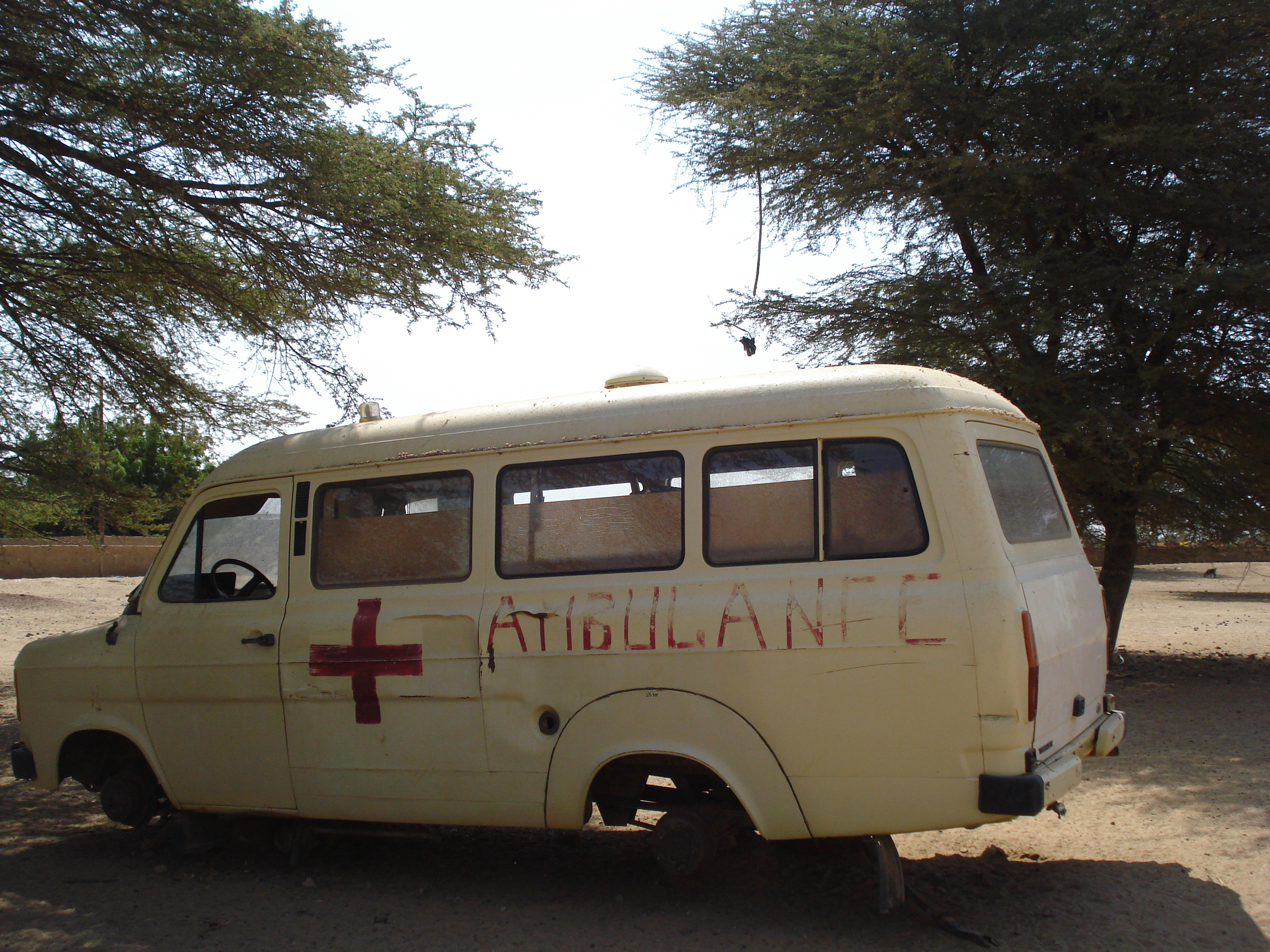
Ambulance in Agnam-Goly, 2006

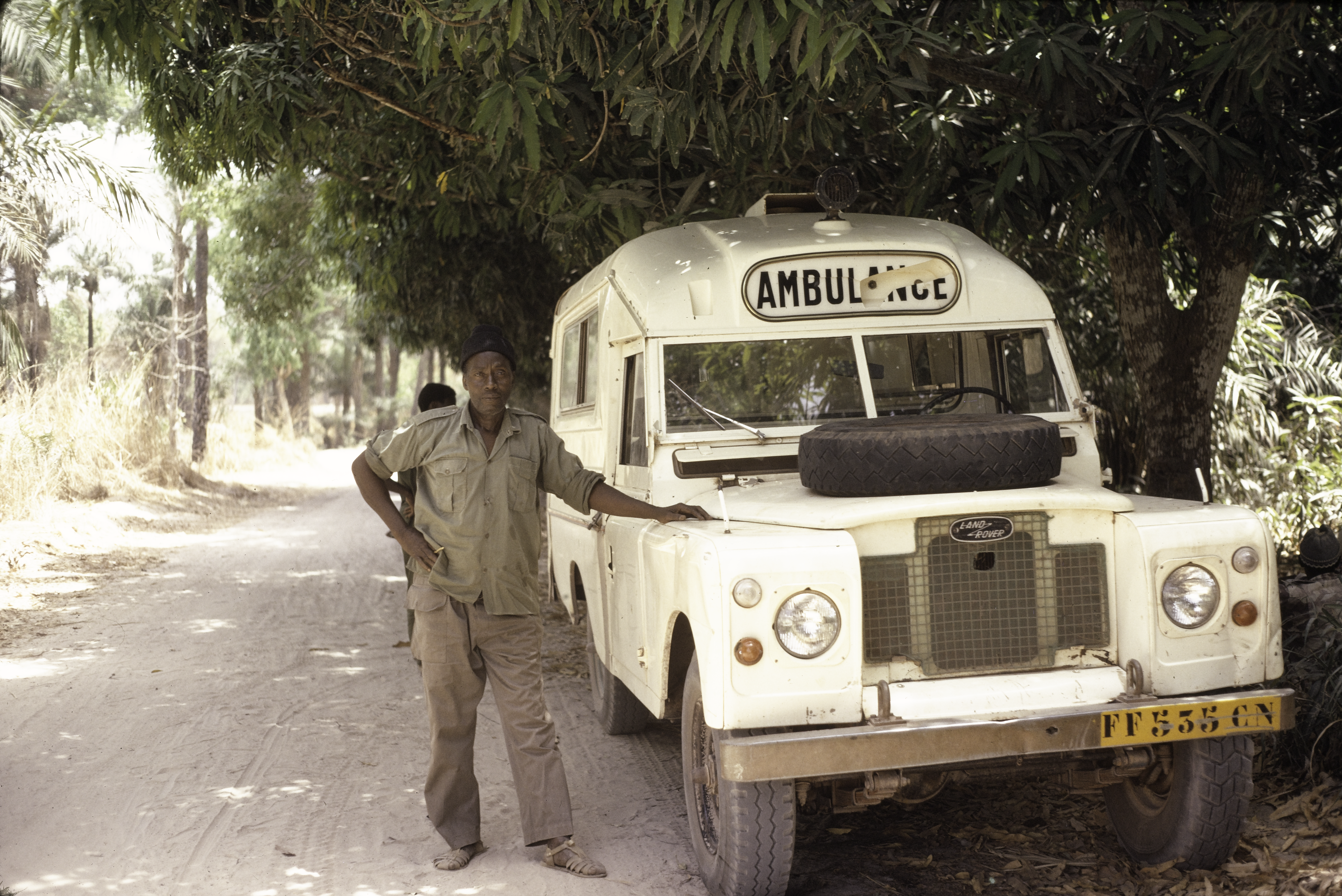
First local hospital ambulance with driver, Ziguinchor, 1973

Often, distance from health care facilities, rough roads, and improper means of transportation limit healthcare access in Senegal. For 80.5% of households, the poorly equipped health post is the only accessible health facility in an average distance of 4.3 kilometers. The closest high-level provider (i.e. a hospital) is located, on average, 20& km away from the village of the household. The improvement in the accessibility of health facilities through better road quality and better means of transport will have a positive effect on health care utilization. Because of extreme distances and environmental conditions, such as muddy roads, only 32% of rural households have regular access to a health center and thereby access to a medical doctor. There are two times more unpaved roads in Senegal than there are paved roads. Often, there is trouble with transportation and vehicles in that non-governmental organizations, or NGOs, may not have a large enough fleet, or vehicles are inappropriate for terrain and dirt roads. Some health centers have ambulances, but there is no plan for vehicle maintenance and replacement. Additionally, there are issues with the transportation of sick, pregnant women; if ambulances are not available, horse-drawn trailers may also be effective. The most effective avenue is to improve the mobility of health care providers rather than solely focusing on improving the mobility of rural populations, which requires far less structural support and funding than does providing transportation for every household.

=== Maternal mortality ===
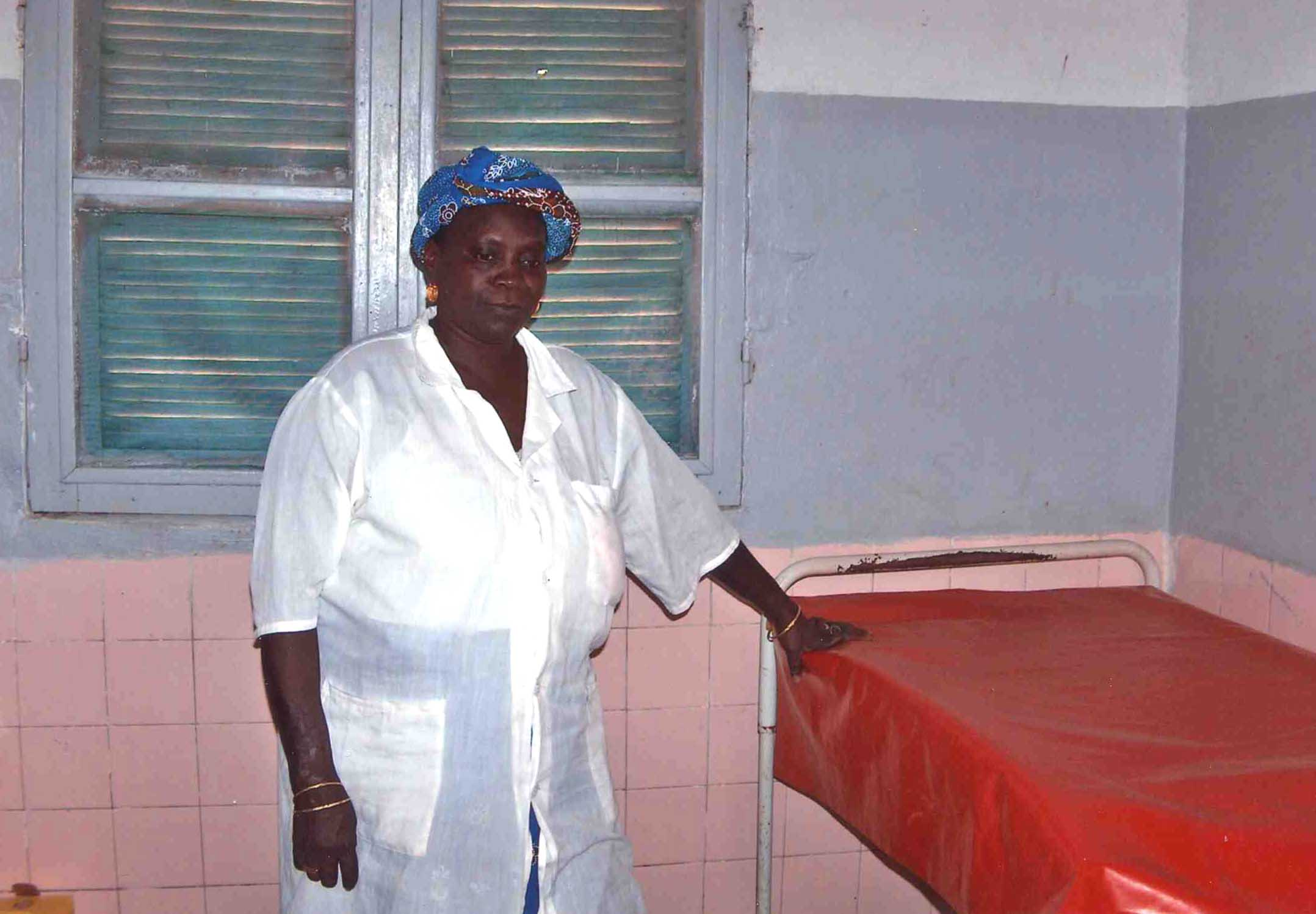
Midwife and birthing bed at an island in the Sine Saloum in Senegal, 2006.

Maternal mortality rates in Senegal remain high relative to those of more developed countries. In 2008, the World Health Organization estimated a maternal mortality rate of 450 deaths per 100,000 live births in Senegal. Maternal deaths are typically clustered around labor, delivery, and the immediate postpartum period. One of the most prevalent issues is the regional imbalance in the distribution of health personnel and health indicators, with a disproportionate burden of disease in Eastern Senegal. Expanding coverage of healthcare workers present at birth, in particular midwifery care, can lessen delays, thus minimizing the risk of severe complications and even death. Increased numbers of health workers in a given region is associated with improved outcomes in maternal mortality. Additionally, extreme conservative practices and fundamentalism can limit dispersal of health personnel, especially that of midwives and other female health workers.

=== Women and structural changes ===
In Senegal, gender relations have been largely ignored in processes of decentralization and implementation of community management strategies. One of the key problems resulting in changes to the health sector is that elected officials and health sector personnel have failed to engage with women as potential leaders and participants in community health structures, instead viewing them in some cases as family health managers and targets of health education messages. As household health managers and primary consumers of public health care, women are intimately connected with realities of managing illness and seeking medical treatment. However, in spite of their marginalization, women are not completely passive in the face of disease. As an example, some women have created networks of service providers in the informal sector for the majority of health care needs in the region of Pikine.

=== Women's health services and activism ===
Social opposition to women's rights and agency have, as some have argued, barred women from receiving necessary choice and capabilities in regard to family planning, abortions, and sexual health. Health services targeted at women primarily concern childbearing. As a result, diseases like cancer or infertility, or those linked to menopause or violence, may be ignored. In Senegal, a large number of health care providers believe unmarried women should not be given information on family planning methods. Moreover, the Senegalese government has in some cases failed to enforce international human rights treaties it has already signed, some of which protect women's health services and rights. Also, women's groups in Senegal have not made sexual health a priority, as some believe they should.

== Approaching healthcare inadequacies ==
=== Community-based health insurance plans (CBHI) ===
One of the major proposed solutions to solving issues within the realm of maternal health care is the inclusion of membership in community-based health insurance plans (CBHI). CHBI schemes are voluntary, non-profit health insurance schemes organized and managed at the community level. In developing nations, CBHI plans are seen as a mechanism to meet health-financing needs of rural informal sector households. CHBI has been incorporated into the national health financing strategy in Senegal. CBHI increases facility-based maternal health services by reducing direct payments, thus facilitating timely use of healthcare. It is beneficial in guarding households against unpredictable and potentially catastrophic medical fees associated with pregnancy-related complications. It can also increase women's interaction with the formal health care sector through its coverage of non-maternal health services. The most important element is the inclusion of maternal health care in any CBHI benefits package, which makes the most significant difference. CBHI plans can increase the demand for and quality of maternal care though requiring certain standards in contracts with health facilities. However, membership in a CBHI scheme is not always sufficient in influencing maternal health behaviors.

=== Community health workers (CHWs) ===
In Senegal community health workers, or CHWs, act as a bridge between the health care delivery system and the community, and ensure that people receive adequate primary health care. During the coronavirus pandemic, these workers became a point of contact for many Senegalese citizens with limited access to other healthcare professionals.

CHWs are part of a larger goal to find appropriate strategies to improve the attraction and retention of health workers in remote and rural areas, which is particularly important in Senegal. CHWs may also empower the community to identify its needs. In Senegalese villages, CHWs are often unable to leave their home community for training and education, which has been a major obstacle for developing effective CHW schemes. Other obstacles include poor transportation, poverty, the need to run families, and the absence of an economic plan for CHW training. In particular, village populations in Senegal do not necessarily recognize in the CHW the skills necessary for outreach activities.

== Mental health ==
The majority of Senegal's healthcare budget goes to physical health needs; mental health remains an area of concern. The Senegalese government spends 9% of its total health budget on mental health. Senegal has no national mental health program, but mental health issues are prevalent. In 2005, nearly 17% of children had emotional, behavioral or neuropsychiatric disorders. Additionally, 16% of adults had psychiatric illness. Primary sources of mental health financing include, in descending order, private insurance, social insurance, out of pocket expenditures by patient or family, and taxes. Mental health is part of primary health care system, with the treatment of severe mental disorders available at the primary level. NGOs are involved with advocacy, prevention, treatment, and rehabilitation. Still, more attention and concern remains to be paid to mental health in Senegal.

== See also ==
- Health in Senegal
