= Ouarkhokh =

Town and commune in Louga Region, Senegal

Ouarkhokh Warkhokh
- Town
- Location within Senegal
- Coordinates: 15.384°N 15.238°W
- Country: Senegal
- Region: Louga Region
- Department: Linguere Department
- Arrondissement: Dodji Arrondissement

Area
  - Total: 1,138 km^{2} (439 sq mi)

Population (2023)
  - Total: 20,861
  - Density: 18.33/km^{2} (47.48/sq mi)
- Time zone: UTC+0 (GMT)

Ouarkhokh or Warkhokh is a town and commune in northern Senegal. It was the capital of the Kingdom of Jolof from the late 17th century to 1865.

== History ==
Warkhokh became capital of Jolof under the reign of Buurba Alboury Jaxeer, who abandoned the old capital of Ceng because it had supported his rival Bakantam Ngaan. The town was the site of an important but indecisive battle in the ongoing civil war.

In July 1865, Warkhokh was captured by the marabout Maba Diakhou Ba, but he was forced to abandon his gains in October and retreat to Saloum.
