= Koungheul Arrondissement =

Arrondissement in Senegal

Koungheul
- Arrondissement
- Interactive map of Koungheul
- Country: Senegal
- Region: Kaolack Region
- Department: Koungheul Department

Population (1988)
  - Total: 85,963
- Time zone: UTC+0 (GMT)

Koungheul Arrondissement is an arrondissement of the Koungheul Department in the Kaolack Region of Senegal. It was formerly part of the Kaffrine Department. In 1988, it contained 85,963 people. The rural community of Koungheul is located within the arrondissement, along with five smaller rural communities.
