= Kaffrine bus crash =

2023 bus crash in central Senegal

- Crash location
- Date: 8 January 2023
- Time: 03:30 (GMT, UTC±00:00)
- Location: Sikilo, Gniby, Kaffrine Region, Senegal; 14°26′N 15°40′W
- Type: Vehicle collision
- Deaths: 40
- Injuries: 101

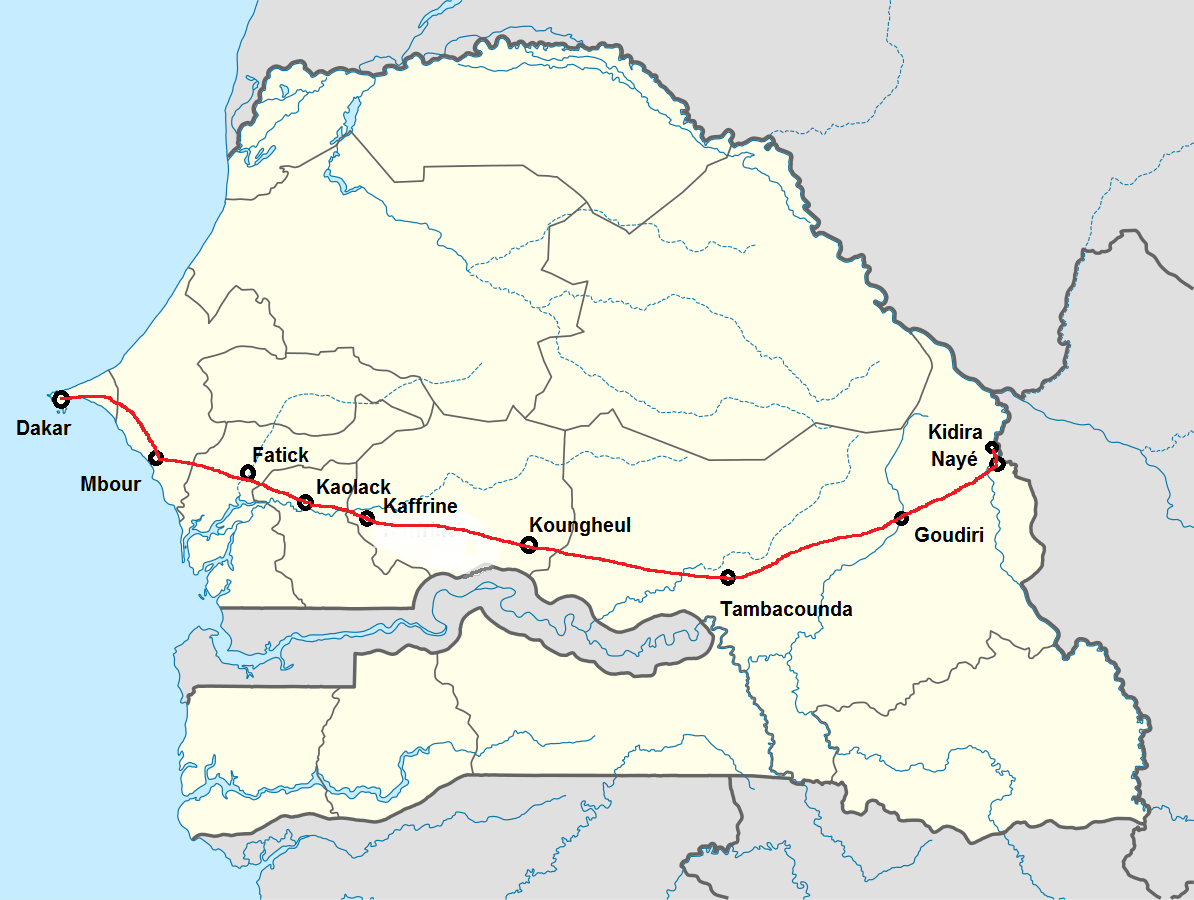
Map of N1 national road.

On 8 January 2023, 40 people were killed and 101 injured in central Senegal when two buses collided in Gniby near the regional capital of Kaffrine on the N1 national road.

== Background ==
Buses, known locally as "schedules," travel at night from region to region in Senegal, and cause many accidents. In October 2020, 16 were killed and 15 injured when a bus collided with a refrigerated lorry near to Malem Hodar. In a nation of 17 million people, there are 700 traffic fatalities every year, a ratio of 24 per 100,000 people; typical for sub-Saharan Africa (where the rate is 27 per 100,000), but much higher than, for example, the European Union, with just 6 deaths per 100,000 people per year. This high rate is blamed on "driver error, poor roads and decrepit vehicles."

Africa accounts for about one-fifth of the world's road deaths, despite only containing 3% of the world's motor vehicles. Africa Transport Policy Program, which works on developing transportation policies, has referred to an "epidemic of road fatalities and serious injuries." More than 270,000 people die in vehicle collisions in Africa each year, and the World Health Organization projects that figure will nearly double by 2030, in part due rapid urbanization.

== Events ==
The crash occurred on Number 1 national road near the town of Gniby at 3:15am local time (UTC+00:00). A public bus heading to Rosso suffered a punctured tire and collided with another bus traveling in the opposite direction. The victims were taken to a hospital in Kaffrine.

== Aftermath ==
President Macky Sall declared three days of national mourning after the accident, to be observed on 9–11 January 2023. After a government meeting in Diamniadio, Prime Minister Amadou Bâ announced that night buses would be temporarily banned between 11 p.m. and 5 a.m., that the import of second-hand tires would be banned, and that vehicles transporting people and goods would have a speed limit of 90 km/h (56 mph) imposed.

== See also ==
- Transport in Senegal
- 2016 Ghana bus collision
- Dschang bus-truck crash (Cameroon, 2021)
