= Birkilane =

- Town and commune
- Location within Senegal
- Coordinates: 14°09′0″N 15°45′0″W
- Country: Senegal
- Region: Kaffrine
- Département: Birkilane

Area
  - Town and commune: 5.85 km^{2} (2.26 sq mi)

Population (2023 census)
  - Town and commune: 10,891
  - Density: 1,860/km^{2} (4,820/sq mi)
- Time zone: UTC+0 (GMT)

Birkilane (or Birkelane) is a town and urban commune in Senegal. It is the principal municipality and administrative centre of Birkilane Department in Kaffrine Region, about 30 km from the town of Kaolack.

== History ==
Birkelane was founded around 1850 by a Serer named Boure Koulemane Dione, who lived in the northeast of Senegal.

In 2008 it was designated a commune of the newly created département of Birkilane.

== Geography ==
The town is located on the N1 national road from Kaolack to Tambacounda and is home to some 7000 inhabitants. The nearest other towns are Nguer, Ganki, Band and Diamal.
