= Nganda =

- Town and commune
- Location within Senegal
- Coordinates: 13°50′N 15°25′W
- Country: Senegal
- Region: Kaffrine Region
- Department: Kaffrine Department

Area
  - Town and commune: 3.12 km^{2} (1.20 sq mi)

Population (2023 census)
  - Town and commune: 14,369
  - Density: 4,610/km^{2} (11,900/sq mi)
- Time zone: UTC±00:00 (GMT)

Nganda is a town and urban commune of the Kaffrine Department in the Kaffrine Region of Senegal, lying close to the border with Gambia.

Nganda had a population of 14,369 in 2023, an increase from the 10,507 counted in 2013.
