= Gniby =

- Arrondissement
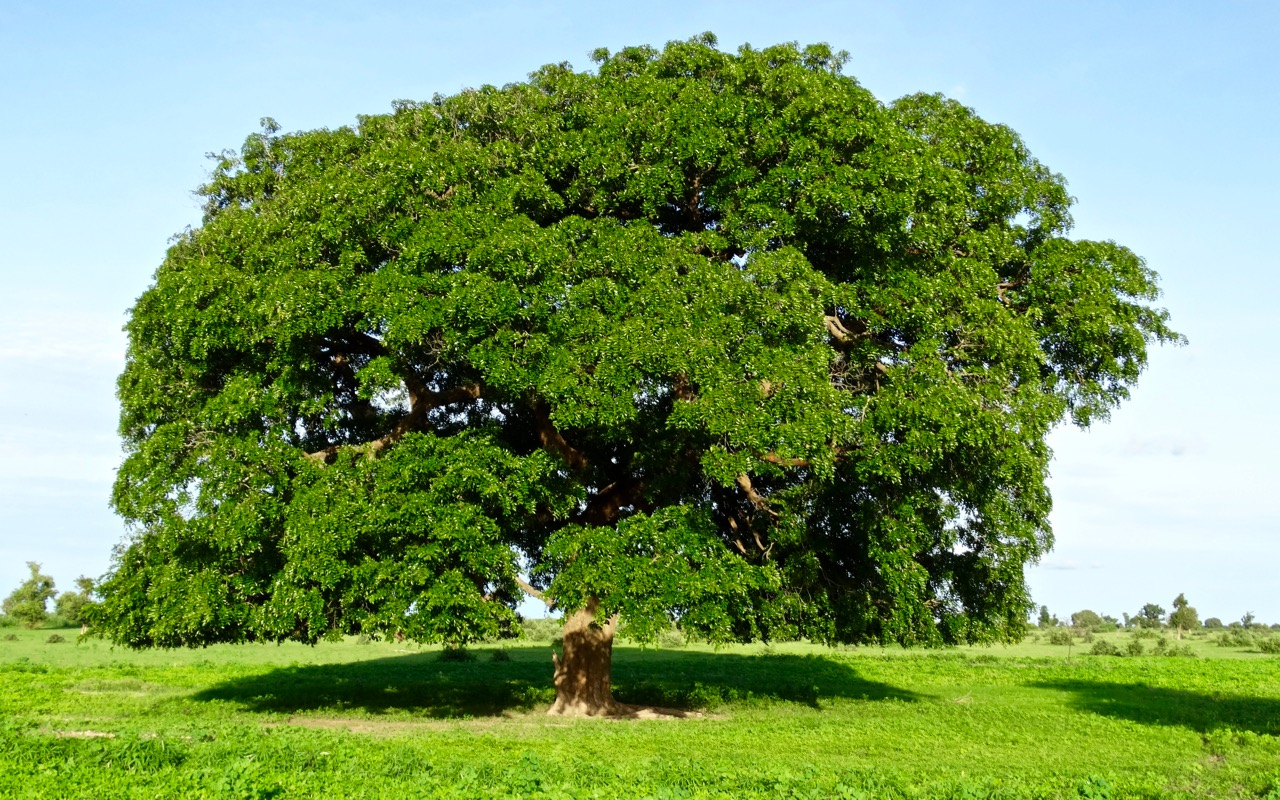
- Afzelia africana near Gniby

- Location within Senegal
- Country: Senegal
- Region: Kaffrine Region
- Department: Kaffrine Department

Gniby is an arrondissement of Kaffrine Department in Kaffrine Region in Senegal.

In 2023, 40 people were killed in a bus crash.
