= Barkedji Arrondissement =

Barkedji
- Arrondissement
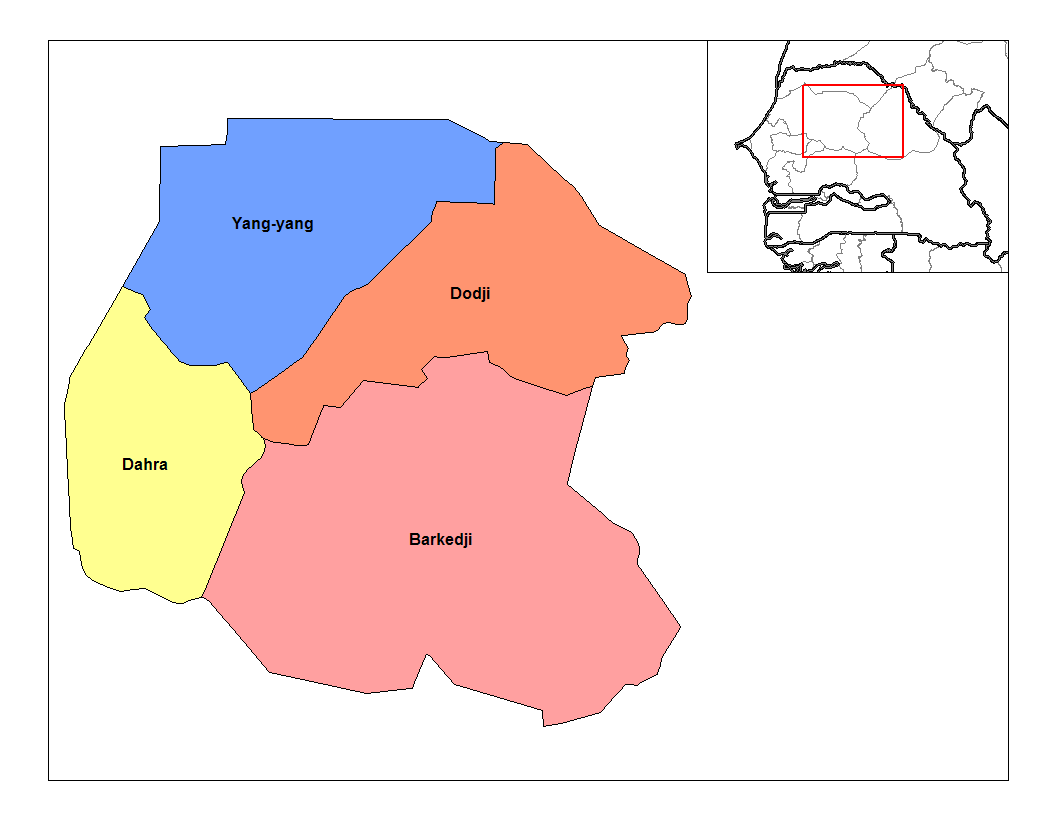
- Location in the Linguére Department
- Country: Senegal
- Region: Louga Region
- Department: Linguère Department
- Time zone: UTC±00:00 (GMT)

Barkedji Arrondissement is an arrondissement of the Linguère Department in the Louga Region of Senegal.

== Subdivisions ==
The arrondissement is divided administratively into rural communities and in turn into villages.
