= Hodar =

Hodar or HODAR can refer to:

- Malem-Hodar Arrondissement, an arrondissement of the Kaffrine Department in the Kaffrine Region of Senegal
- Malem Hodar Department, one of the departments of Senegal
- Husband of a Daughter of the American Revolution (acronym)
