= Malem-Hodar Arrondissement =

- Arrondissement
- Interactive map of Malem-Hodar Arrondissement
- Country: Senegal
- Region: Kaffrine Region
- Department: Kaffrine Department
- Time zone: UTC±00:00 (GMT)

Malem-Hodar Arrondissement is an arrondissement of the Kaffrine Department in the Kaffrine Region of Senegal.

== Subdivisions ==
The arrondissement is divided administratively into rural communities and in turn into villages.
