= Linguère =

- Town and commune
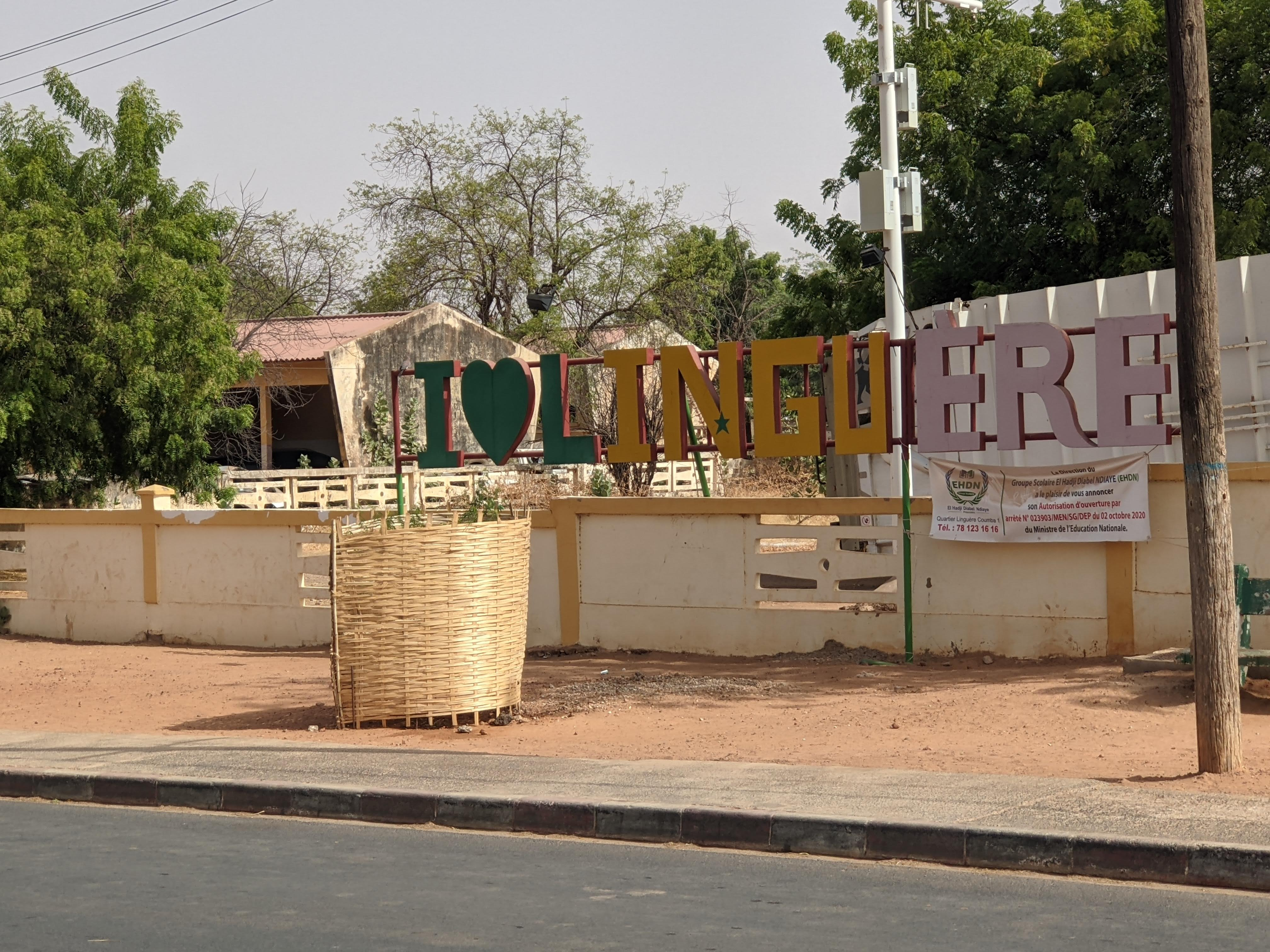

- Location within Senegal
- Coordinates: 15°23′40″N 15°7′0″W
- Country: Senegal
- Region: Louga Region
- Department: Linguère

Area
  - Town and commune: 7.29 km^{2} (2.81 sq mi)

Population (2023 census)
  - Town and commune: 19,191
  - Density: 2,630/km^{2} (6,820/sq mi)
- Time zone: UTC+0 (GMT)

Linguère (or Lingeer in Serer and Wolof) is a town and urban commune located in the Linguère Department, Louga Region of Senegal.

== History ==
Linguére was the capital of the Jolof Empire and its successor, the Kingdom of Jolof. The name Lingeer was also used as a title for Serer and Wolof queens and royal princesses.

== Transport ==
The town lies on the N3 road connecting it to Dakar and Touba to the west and Ouro Sogui and Mauretania to the east.

The town was formally the terminus of a branch railway. The train station is now in ruins and the tracks are non-existent as they have been ripped up and used by locals as part of fences.

== Infrastructure ==
The town has roughly 15,000 inhabitants, and is served by a weekly market that takes place on Fridays. There are usually one or two US Peace Corps volunteers stationed in the town, and surrounding villages. There is a post office, a bank, a small daily vegetable market, a bar, a sometimes running internet cafe, and several stores. There is also a 'Gare Routiere', a public transit hub connecting the town to other cities in the east: Louga, Dahra, Touba, and Dakar. The village of Nguith nearby is a traditional Wolof village (4 km to the west), with a deep-bore well, schools, health post, and functioning village government. The village is run by two families, the Coundouls, and Talls.

In 2007, according to official estimates, Linguère had a population of 13,610.

== Climate ==
Linguère has a hot desert climate (BWh) according to the Köppen climate classification.

Climate data for Linguère
Month	Jan	Feb	Mar	Apr	May	Jun	Jul	Aug	Sep	Oct	Nov	Dec	Year
Mean daily maximum °C (°F)	32.7 (90.9)	35.5 (95.9)	37.4 (99.3)	39.7 (103.5)	40.8 (105.4)	39.2 (102.6)	35.8 (96.4)	34.2 (93.6)	34.5 (94.1)	37.2 (99.0)	36.1 (97.0)	33.1 (91.6)	36.4 (97.4)
Mean daily minimum °C (°F)	16.1 (61.0)	17.8 (64.0)	18.9 (66.0)	21.1 (70.0)	22.6 (72.7)	24.0 (75.2)	24.2 (75.6)	24.1 (75.4)	23.8 (74.8)	22.8 (73.0)	19.7 (67.5)	16.7 (62.1)	21.0 (69.8)
Average precipitation mm (inches)	1.1 (0.04)	1.3 (0.05)	0.5 (0.02)	0.1 (0.00)	1.0 (0.04)	18.2 (0.72)	86.8 (3.42)	151.7 (5.97)	130.0 (5.12)	30.3 (1.19)	0.0 (0.0)	0.8 (0.03)	421.8 (16.6)
Average precipitation days (≥ 1.0 mm)	0.1	0.2	0.1	0	0.3	1.6	5.6	9.5	8.4	2.4	0	0.1	28.3
Average relative humidity (%)	29	30	31	34	39	50	66	75	76	63	41	33	47
Mean monthly sunshine hours	248.0	249.2	279.0	276.0	269.7	240.0	238.7	229.4	225.0	257.3	246.0	235.6	2,993.9
Mean daily sunshine hours	8.0	8.9	9.0	9.2	8.7	8.0	7.7	7.4	7.5	8.3	8.2	7.6	8.2
Source 1: NCEI(precipitation, precipitation days 1991-2020) (temperatures-sun 1961-1990)
Source 2: FAO(humidity 1971-2000)
