= Birkilane department =

Coordinates: 14°08′N 15°45′W

Birkilane
- Department
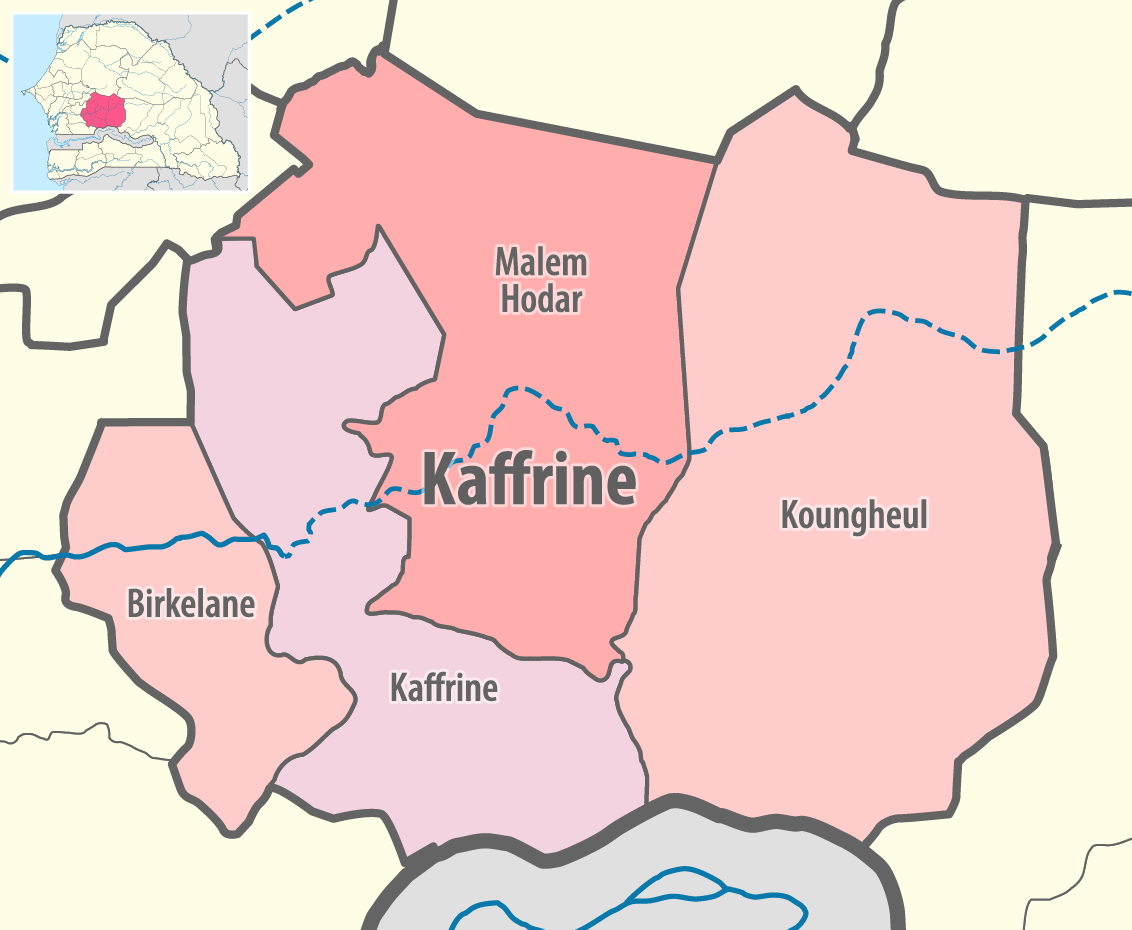
- Country: Senegal
- Region: Kaffrine Region
- Capital: Birkilane
- Established: 2008

Population (2023 census)
  - Total: 151,205
- Time zone: UTC±00:00 (GMT)

Birkilane department is one of the 46 departments of Senegal and is located in the Kaffrine region. It was created as part of the new region in 2008.

== Administrative divisions ==
The principal settlement is the commune of Birkilane.

The rural districts (communautés rurales) comprise:

- Arrondissement of Keur Mboucki:
  - Diamal
  - Keur Mboucki
  - Touba Mbella
- Arrondissement of Maboi:
  - Mabo
  - Mbeuleup
  - Ndiognick
  - Ségré Gatta
