= Malem Hodar =

- Town and commune
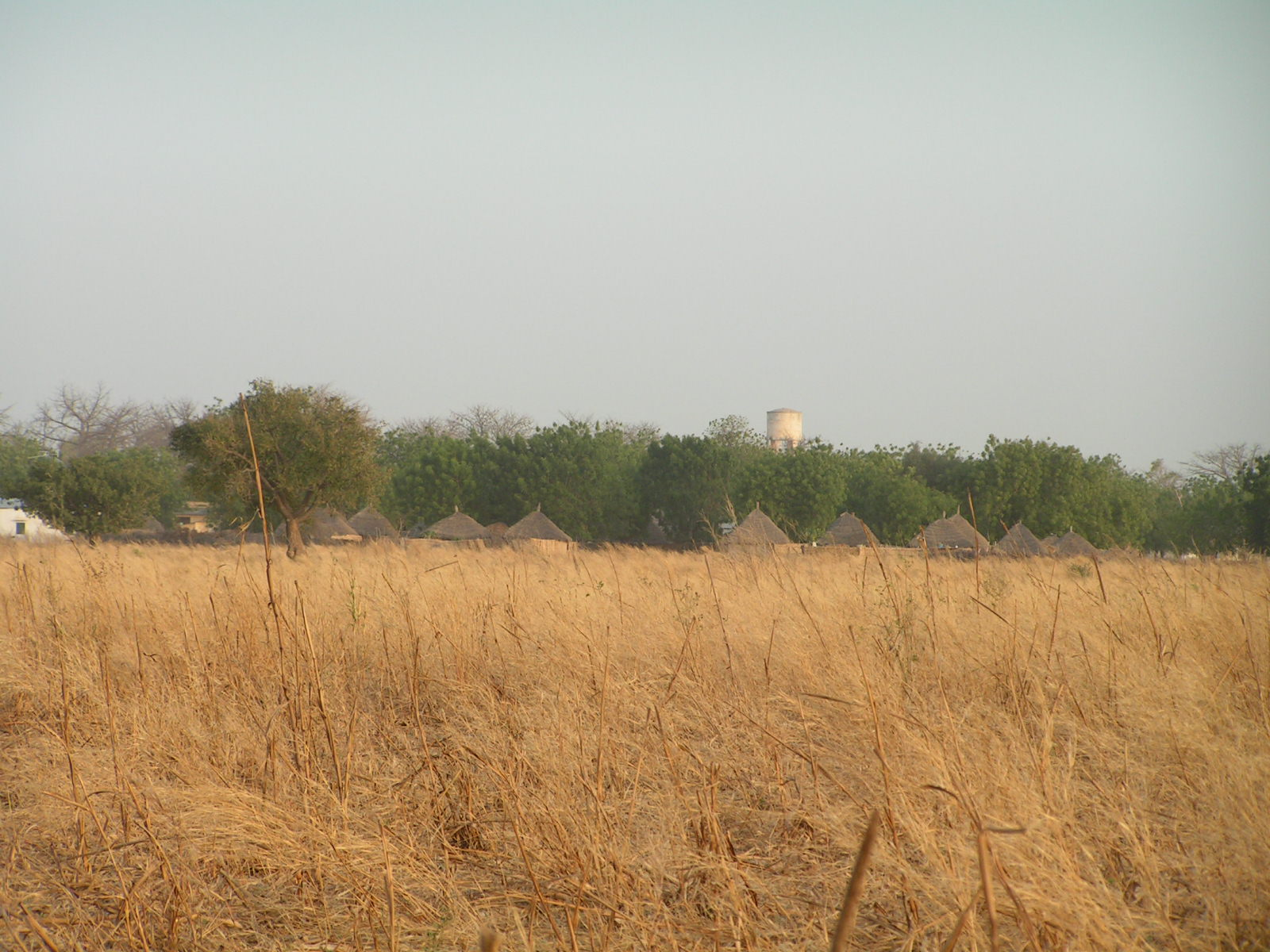
- View of Malem Hodar

- Location within Senegal
- Coordinates: 14°05′18″N 15°17′40″W
- Country: Senegal
- Region: Kaffrine
- Département: Malem Hodar

Government
  - Mayor: Abdou Ndao

Area
  - Town and commune: 4.837 km^{2} (1.868 sq mi)
- Elevation: 41 m (135 ft)

Population (2023 census)
  - Town and commune: 12,188
  - Density: 2,520/km^{2} (6,526/sq mi)
- Time zone: UTC+0 (GMT)

Malem Hodar is a town and urban commune in Senegal. It is the principal municipality and administrative centre of the Malem Hodar Department of the Kaffrine Region.

A decree of 1972 led to the creation of rural communities (communautés rurales) in 1976, since when Malem Hodar was elevated in 2008 to an urban commune.

== History ==
In 2008 Malem Hodar was created an urban commune at the same time as the creation of the département of Malem Hodar, for which it is the administrative centre.

== Geography ==
The commune of Malem Hodar is located in the south-east of the arondissement of the same name, covering an area of 625.5 km^{2} and encompassing 64 villages. The population in 2002 amounted to 29,570 inhabitants with a growth rate of 2.25%. The rural community density is 47 inhabitants per km^{2}.

== See also ==
- Communes of Senegal
