= Koungheul =

- Town and commune
- Location within Senegal
- Coordinates: 13°59′0″N 14°48′0″W
- Country: Senegal
- Region: Kaffrine
- Département: Koungheul

Area
  - Town and commune: 8.001 km^{2} (3.089 sq mi)

Population (2023 census)
  - Town and commune: 31,149
  - Density: 3,893/km^{2} (10,080/sq mi)
- Time zone: UTC+0 (GMT)

Koungheul is a town and urban commune in central Senegal in the department of the same name. It lies in the region of Kaffrine and is situated between the towns of Kaolack and Tambacounda. The population is 31,149 (2023 census), most of whom are Wolof people.

== Transport ==
It is served by a railway station on the Dakar-Niger Railway.

== Climate ==
Koungheul has a hot semi-arid climate (Köppen BSh) with no rainfall from November to May and moderate to heavy rainfall from June to October.

Climate data for Koungheul (1991–2020)
Month	Jan	Feb	Mar	Apr	May	Jun	Jul	Aug	Sep	Oct	Nov	Dec	Year
Mean daily maximum °C (°F)	36.0 (96.8)	38.3 (100.9)	40.8 (105.4)	42.2 (108.0)	41.9 (107.4)	39.0 (102.2)	35.2 (95.4)	33.5 (92.3)	33.8 (92.8)	36.4 (97.5)	38.5 (101.3)	36.7 (98.1)	37.7 (99.9)
Mean daily minimum °C (°F)	17.0 (62.6)	19.2 (66.6)	21.6 (70.9)	23.6 (74.5)	25.0 (77.0)	25.6 (78.1)	24.8 (76.6)	24.3 (75.7)	23.8 (74.8)	23.8 (74.8)	19.8 (67.6)	17.0 (62.6)	22.1 (71.8)
Average precipitation mm (inches)	0.5 (0.02)	0.1 (0.00)	0.2 (0.01)	0.3 (0.01)	11.3 (0.44)	63.4 (2.50)	174.1 (6.85)	247.7 (9.75)	193.1 (7.60)	46.4 (1.83)	0.8 (0.03)	0.1 (0.00)	738 (29.1)
Average precipitation days (≥ 1.0 mm)	0.1	0.0	0.0	0.1	0.7	4.3	9.9	14.3	12.0	4.2	0.1	0.0	45.7
Source: NOAA

== See also ==
- Railway stations in Senegal
