= Koungheul department =

Coordinates: 13°59′N 14°48′W

Koungheul
- Department
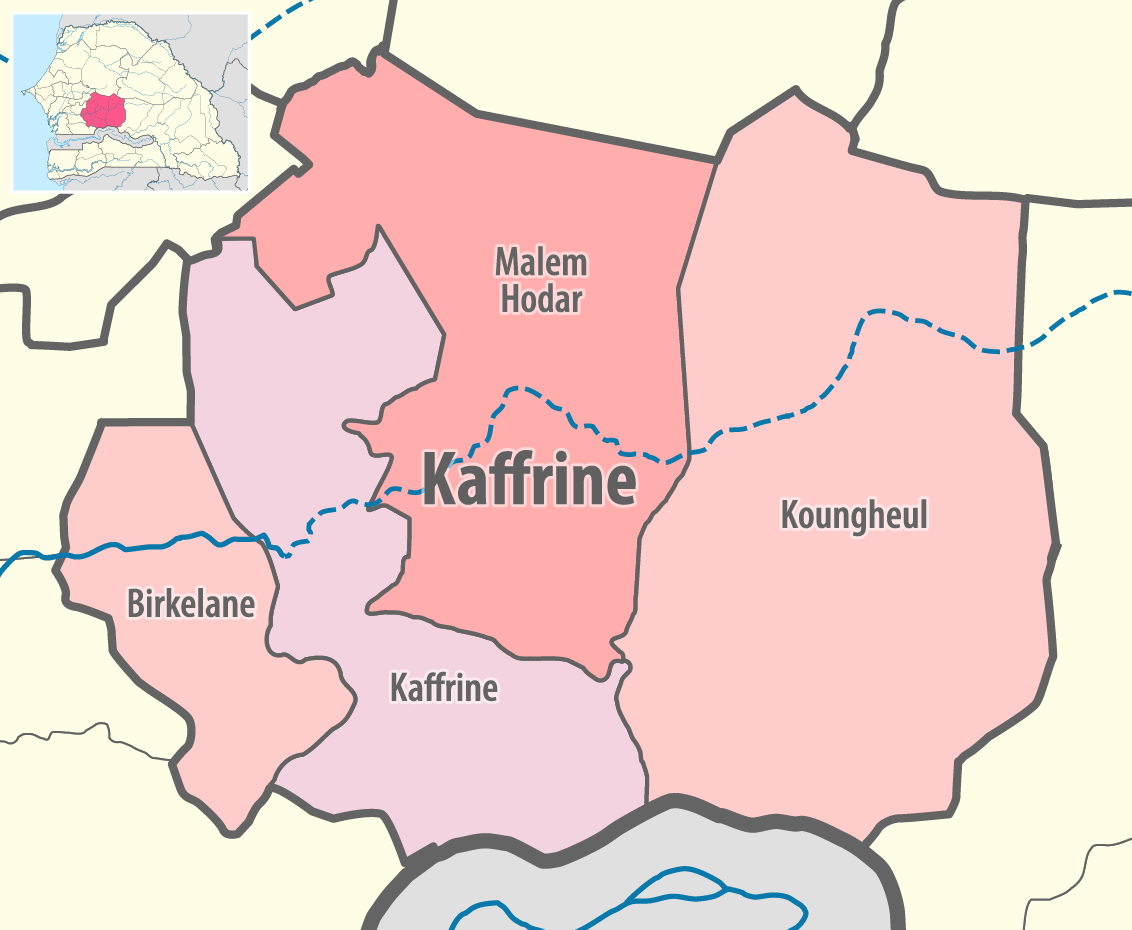
- Country: Senegal
- Region: Kaffrine Region
- Commune: Koungheul

Population (2023 census)
  - Total: 253,710
- Time zone: UTC+0 (GMT)

Koungheul is the name of one of 46 departments of Senegal, as well as the name of Koungheul Arrondissement and the commune of Koungheul, the principal settlement of the department.

In 2006, the new Koungheul department was created as a division of Kaffrine region, by carving off the eastern half of the Kaffrine department. For administrative purposes it comprises:

- Koungheul Arrondissement with one commune (town).
  - Koungheul
- Ida Moride Arrondissement with three communautés rurales (rural communities).
  - Fass Thiékène
  - Ida Mouride
  - Saly Escale
- Lour Escale Arrondissement with two communautés rurales.
  - Lour Escale
  - Ribot Escale
- Missirah Wadene Arrondissement with three communautés rurales.
  - Maka Yop
  - Missirah Wadène
  - Ngainthe Pathè

The 14 Regions of Senegal are subdivided into 46 departments and 103 arrondissements (neither of which have administrative function) and by collectivités locales (the 14 régions, 113 communes, and 370 communautés rurales) which elect administrative officers.
