= Malem Hodar department =

Malem Hodar
- Department
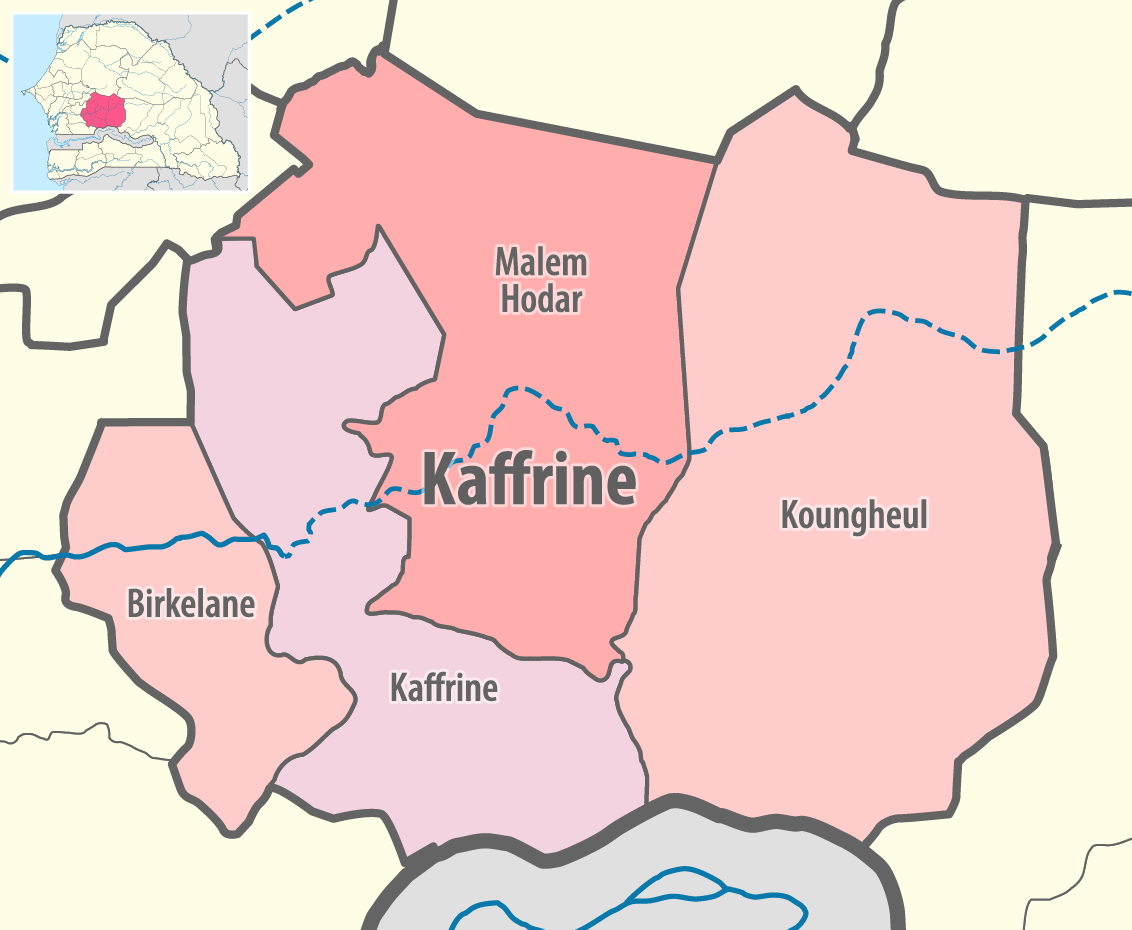
- Coordinates: 14°05′N 15°18′W
- Country: Senegal
- Region: Kaffrine Region
- Capital: Malem Hodar

Population (2023 census)
  - Total: 135,403
- Time zone: UTC±00:00 (GMT)

Malem Hodar department is one of the 46 departments of Senegal, and is located in the Kaffrine region. It was created as part of the new region in 2008.

The main settlement is the commune of Malem Hodar. In addition there are the rural communities (Communautés rurales) of Darou Minam, Djanke Souf, Khelcom, Ndiobene Samba Lamo, Ndioume Ngainthe and Sagna.
