= Health in Senegal =

Development of life expectancy

Expenditure on health in Senegal was 4.7% of its GDP in 2014, US$107 per capita.

Life expectancy at birth was estimated as 65 years for men in 2016 and 69 for women. This is above the regional average for sub-Saharan Africa but below the world average.

In 2001 data, 54% of the population of Senegal was below the poverty line, which has implications on people's wellbeing. Common medical problems in Senegal include child mortality, maternal death, malaria, and sexual diseases including HIV/AIDS. There is a high disparity in both the quality and extent of health services between urban and rural areas. The greatest problems in public health are in the East and South (Louga, Kaolack, and Tambacounda) and the region of Casamance.

The Human Rights Measurement Initiative finds that Senegal is fulfilling 73.3% of what it should be fulfilling for the right to health based on its level of income.

== Specific diseases ==
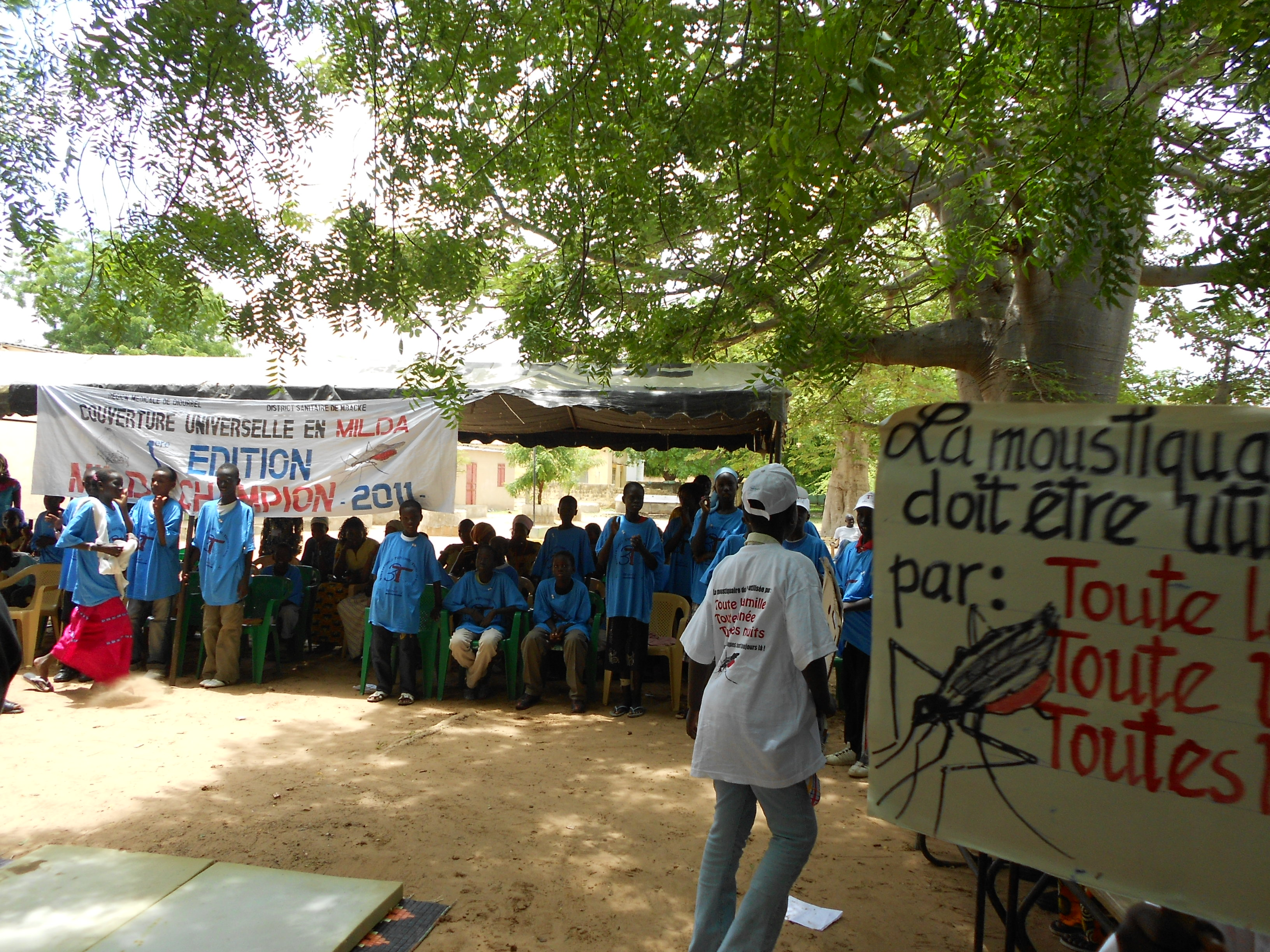
In Senegal, Mbacke Primary School students compete in a trivia contest to see who knows the most about malaria. (Antoinette Sullivan/USAID), 24 August 2011.

A number of diseases continue to afflict persons who live in and travel to Senegal, some of which are related to Senegal's tropical climate. One of the most prominent diseases is malaria, a parasitic disease transmitted by mosquito bites. Other diseases affecting Senegal include:

- Syphilis, which is directly related to the social environment, poor health, and housing conditions
- Tuberculosis, which is mostly localized in Dakar and Thies, and affects more men than women, with approximately 9500 cases of tuberculosis per year in Senegal and a 2–4% mortality rate
- Schistosomiasis, a parasitic disease common in the tropics
- Trypanosomiasis, or sleeping sickness, a parasitic disease that has long affected the valleys in Eastern Senegal, known as Ferlo
- Meningitis, with outbreaks between February and March, especially in Eastern Senegal and occasionally in Dakar.
- Cholera, with outbreaks continuing to be problematic. In 2007 alone, there were over 2000 reported cases of cholera in Senegal.

=== Malaria ===
While the number of reported malaria cases has dropped in recent years (due in part to a change in case definition), malaria is still a major cause of morbidity and mortality and a high priority for the government. Malaria is endemic throughout Senegal, and the entire population is at risk. Transmission occurs seasonally and is affected by rainfall and persistent flooding, especially in peri-urban areas. Plasmodium falciparum is the major cause of infection.

Senegal has made significant progress against malaria and remains a leader in piloting and scaling up new recommendations and innovative strategies. The National Malaria Control Program has adopted a National Strategic Plan for 2016–2020, which strives to achieve the pre-elimination of malaria (defined as annual incidence < 5 cases per 1,000) by 2020. Under this plan, malaria interventions will continue to be targeted to the different transmission zones. In addition to the standard interventions, low transmission areas (pre-elimination zones) are eligible for case investigation and reactive case detection, while the highest transmission regions (control zones) receive seasonal malaria chemoprevention and are prioritized for home-based management. As a result of the scale-up of malaria control interventions, parasitemia in children under five years of age fell from six percent nationwide in 2008 to one percent nationwide in 2016, confirming the declining trend of the transmission. The 2016 continuous Demographic and Health Survey showed that under-five mortality continued to fall in Senegal from 121 deaths per 1,000 live births in 2005 to 51 in 2016 – a 58 percent drop since 2005.

=== HIV/AIDS ===
The rate of HIV/AIDS in Senegal is one of the lowest in Africa, at approximately 0.9%. According to the UNAIDS, the proportion of adults between the ages of 15 and 49 with HIV/AIDS is approximately 0.9%. The Casamance region has the highest prevalence of HIV/AIDS at 2.0%, which can be attributed in part to the Casamance conflict. There are about 59,000 people in Senegal living with HIV/AIDS, according to a 2009 estimate.

== Women's healthcare concerns ==
A number of healthcare concerns afflict women in particular, among them female genital mutilation, maternal healthcare, and gendered healthcare discrepancies. Further, the restructuring of the health care system has also affected women significantly.

=== Female genital mutilation ===
About 20 percent of Senegalese women undergo female genital mutilation of some kind, with the most prevalent procedure being the removal of the tip of the clitoris, according to the National Program Against Female Genital Mutilation. It is not widespread among the Wolof or Serer, but is more common among the Fulani, the Diola, the Toucouleurs and the Mandingo.

=== Births and fertility ===
The birth rate in Senegal is about 36.19 births per 1000 people, according to a 2012 estimate. The fertility rate, according to 2007 estimates, is relatively high, with an average of five children per woman. Moreover, the infant mortality rate is 55.16 deaths per 1,000 live births, and the infant mortality rate of males is slightly higher than that of females.

=== Abortion ===
There are many cultural and social barriers that limit abortion in Senegal. Studies have shown that there is strong opposition, from both men and women, to women's individual choice and agency with abortions, family planning, and sexual health. Therapeutic abortion is allowed to protect a woman's health or life if threatened by pregnancy, but abortion of any other kind is banned.

=== Cosmetic Surgery ===
Senegalese women resort to cosmetic surgery abroad, particularly in Morocco, Tunisia, and Turkey.

== Children's health ==
A child waits outside a medical clinic as part of Western Accord 2012 in Thies, Senegal, June 10, 2012.

Children's health in Senegal is of primary concern to development strategists, and is heavily influenced by the health, education, and wellbeing of women. According to data from 2005, 14.5% percent of Senegalese children under the age of five were underweight. Only 42% of children between 12 and 23 months received all necessary vaccinations. Children whose mothers have a primary education have a lower prevalence of malnutrition, and children whose mothers have advanced education are most likely to have the lowest incidence of malnutrition.

Rates of malnutrition are most pronounced among infants between one and two years old. Barriers to children's health include:

- maternal misunderstanding of the nutritional needs of the child
- a lack of nutritional follow-up of the children
- the non-practice of the exclusive breast feeding at least for the first four months of life of the infant
- a misunderstanding of good weaning practices
- the precariousness of the health condition of the children (frequency of the febrile episodes associated with diarrhea and respiratory infections)
- poor living standards
- difficulty accessing access to certain basic elements

The nutritional health conditions of children less than five years old may relate to the age as well as the child's cycle of life, the size and place of residence, elements linked to the household environment such as the nature of the soil of the housing, the source of supply in drinking water, the evacuation mode of the domestic garbage, and the mother's level of education. Although child mortality in Senegal is improving overall, deaths of children under one year of age are growing as a proportion of total child deaths, notably within the Diourbel region.

== See also ==
- Healthcare in Senegal
- COVID-19 pandemic in Senegal
