= Dahra =

- Town and commune
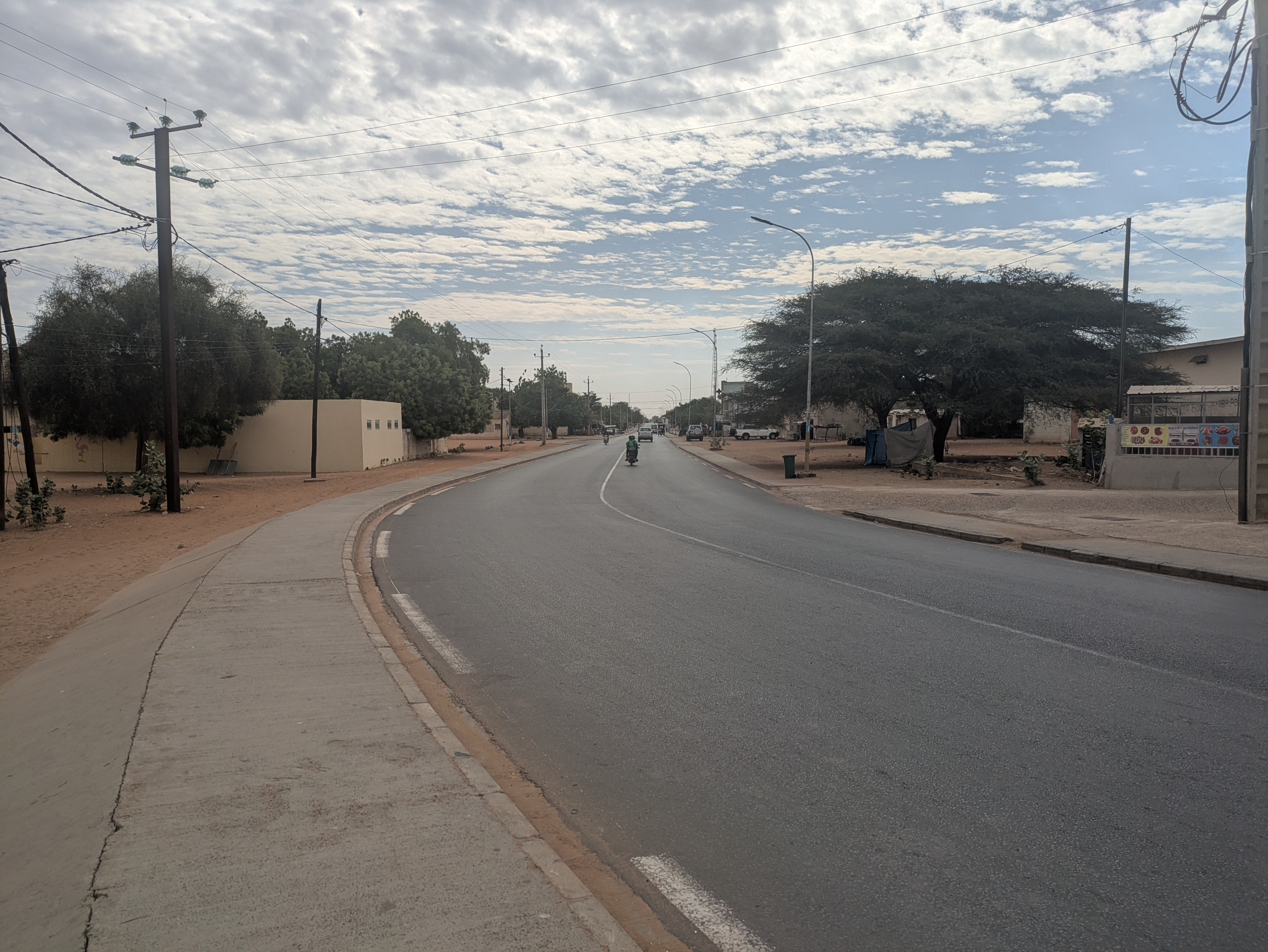
- The N3 highway in Dahra

- Location in Senegal
- Coordinates: 15°21′N 15°36′W
- Country: Senegal
- Region: Louga
- Department: Linguère

Area
  - Town and commune: 18.91 km^{2} (7.30 sq mi)

Population (2023 census)
  - Town and commune: 45,530
  - Density: 2,408/km^{2} (6,236/sq mi)
- Time zone: UTC+0 (GMT)

Dahra (also Dahra Djoloff or Dara) is a town of commune status located in the Louga Region of Senegal at roughly 264 km from Dakar, to which it is connected via the N3 road. It is near the ISRA Centre de recherché zootechniques and 40 km from the old King of Djoloff's residence (yang-yang) named Alboury Ndiaye. The town has a population of 45,530 and the main activity is agriculture and animal breeding.

Dahra is popular because of the weekly market, which gathers many stockbreeders and tradesmen from around the country.
