= HIV/AIDS in Senegal =

Although Senegal is a relatively underdeveloped country, HIV prevalence in the general population is low at around 0.08 per 1000 people, under 1% of the population. This relatively low prevalence rate is aided by the fact that few people are infected every year – in 2016, 1100 new cases were reported vs 48,000 new cases in Brazil. Senegal's death due to HIV rate, particularly when compared it to its HIV prevalence rate, is relatively high with 1600 deaths in 2016. Almost two times as many women were infected with HIV as men in 2016, and while almost three times as many women were receiving antiretroviral therapy (ARV) as men, only 52% of HIV positive people in Senegal received ARV treatment in 2016.

One way that Senegal maintains a low HIV prevalence is through conservative cultural norms that discourage sex outside of marriage, limiting the number of sexual partners an average Senegalese person will have and thus limiting their chance of coming into contact with the virus. The government also passed legislation to make working closely with sex workers to ensure they get regular STI and HIV tests and treatment possible. Senegal also has had huge public health campaigns to promote condom usage. Senegalese hospitals have also had their blood supplies screened for syphilis and hepatitis since 1970, leading to the removal of some blood contaminated with HIV before an HIV antibody test was created. Currently, hospitals are well equipped with sterile equipment in order to prevent transmission of HIV by hospital procedure.

== New infection statistics ==
In the general population, 80% of new infections occur in people in monogamous relationships. According to Senegal's AIDS authority, among the newly infected, three-quarters of people engage in some high risk behavior. About one quarter of the newly infected engage in high risk behaviors themselves and about half of the newly infected have a partner who engages in high risk activities. Because homosexuality is illegal in Senegal, many MSMs have long term female partners as well as male partners, so many women unknowingly have a partner who is in a high risk group.

=== At risk populations ===
While the overall HIV prevalence rate in Senegal is low, the prevalence rate is significantly higher in certain populations. Among men who have sex with men (MSM), the prevalence rate is around 19% and among sex workers, the prevalence rate is close to 22%. As a result, the Senegalese government has put emphasis on preventing transmission of the virus from these groups. The HIV transmission rate in MSM communities has not decreased, partially because Senegal maintains laws against homosexuality. As a result, MSMs fear seeking testing and treatment for HIV for fear of being arrested. Despite promising to work to reduce the HIV prevalence rate in communities of people having non-heterosexual sex, the Senegalese government arrested 9 men working in HIV prevention for violating anti-homosexuality laws. Despite the later overturning of their convictions, the arrests created fear and suspicion in the MSM community.

The Senegalese government provides medical services to registered sex workers, but in recent years, the number of covert sex workers has been increasing. These unregistered sex workers cannot access sex worker-specific government health services. As many as 80% of all Senegalese sex workers may be unregistered. As a result, most sex workers do not have access to government sponsored STI and HIV testing and education about HIV prevention.

== National response ==
Unlike many African countries which denied the existence of the HIV epidemic, Senegal responded quickly when its first AIDS case was diagnosed in 1986. The Programme National de Lutte contre le SIDA (PNLS) was established to coordinate the government's anti-AIDS activity in 1986 and was later renamed the Conseil National de Lutte contre le SIDA (CNLS). The Senegalese government worked in cooperation with religious leaders and health professionals in order to maximize the reach of HIV/AIDS prevention education. In addition to working with religious figures to enhance public cooperation, the Senegalese government ran a condom marketing campaign and distributed more than 10 million free condoms in partnership with USAID in order to try to limit HIV transmission. Many HIV positive people make efforts to hide their status because there is much discrimination against them, which complicates the government's attempts to provide services to the HIV positive population. The Senegalese government is still working to stop the spread of AIDS. CNLS's goals for 2030 include zero new infections, zero deaths tied to AIDS, and zero discrimination against HIV-positive Senegalese citizens.

== See also ==
- Health in Senegal
- HIV
- Senegal
