= Dodji Airport =

Airport in Senegal

- IATA: none; ICAO: GO66

Summary
- Airport type: Public
- Serves: Dodji
- Elevation AMSL: 110 ft / 34 m
- Coordinates: 15°32′35″N 14°57′30″W

Map
- Location of the airport in Senegal

Runways
Direction	Length		Surface
Direction	ft	m	Surface
02/20	5,250	1,600	Sand
- Source: Google Maps

Dodji Airport (ICAO: GO66) is an airport serving the town of Dodji in Senegal.

== See also ==
- Transport in Senegal
