= Linguère department =

Coordinates: 15°23′43″N 15°07′09″W

Linguère
- Department
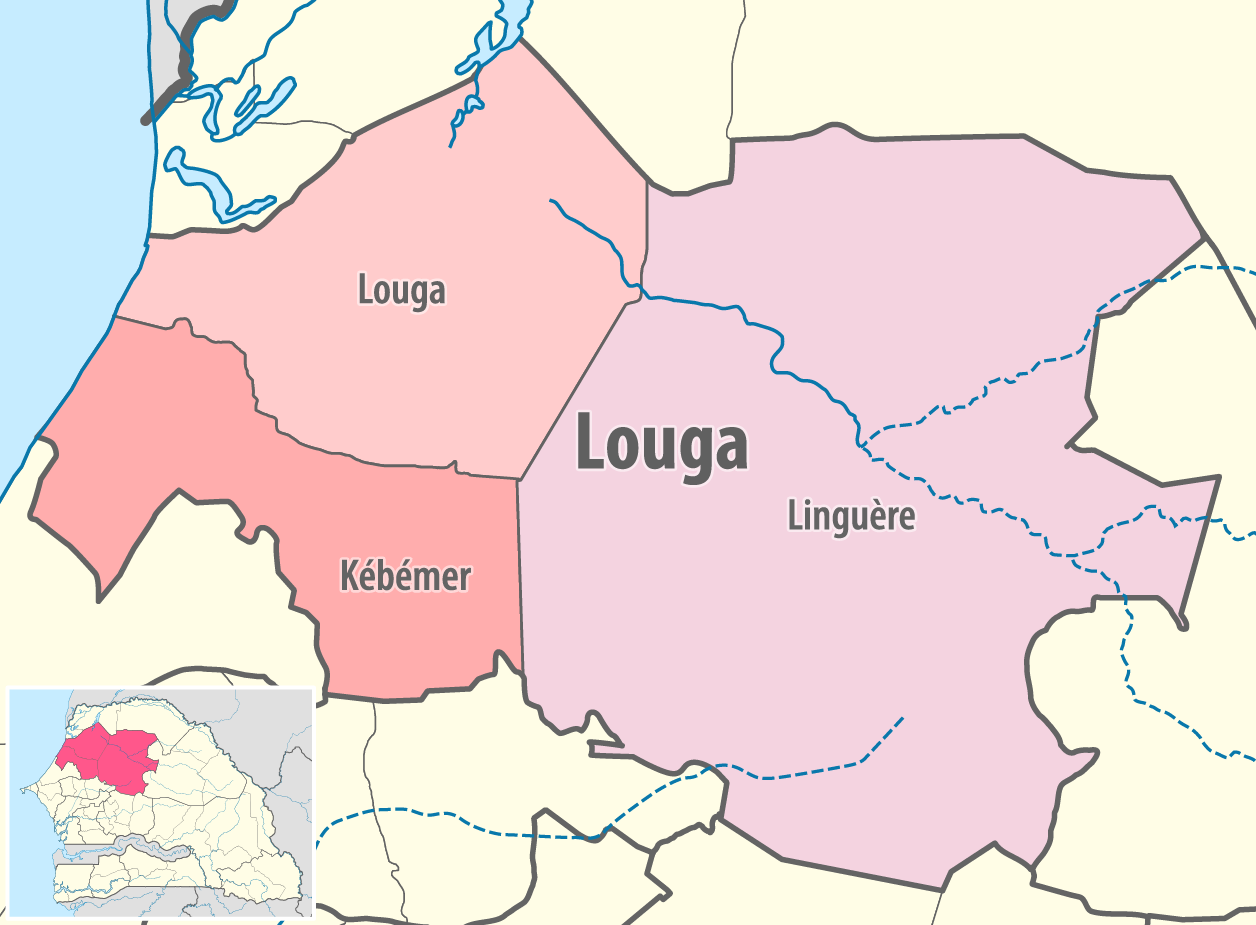
- Location in the Louga region
- Country: Senegal
- Region: Louga region
- Capital: Linguère

Area
  - Total: 15,375 km^{2} (5,936 sq mi)

Population (2023 census)
  - Total: 312,831
  - Density: 20.347/km^{2} (52.698/sq mi)
- Time zone: UTC+0 (GMT)

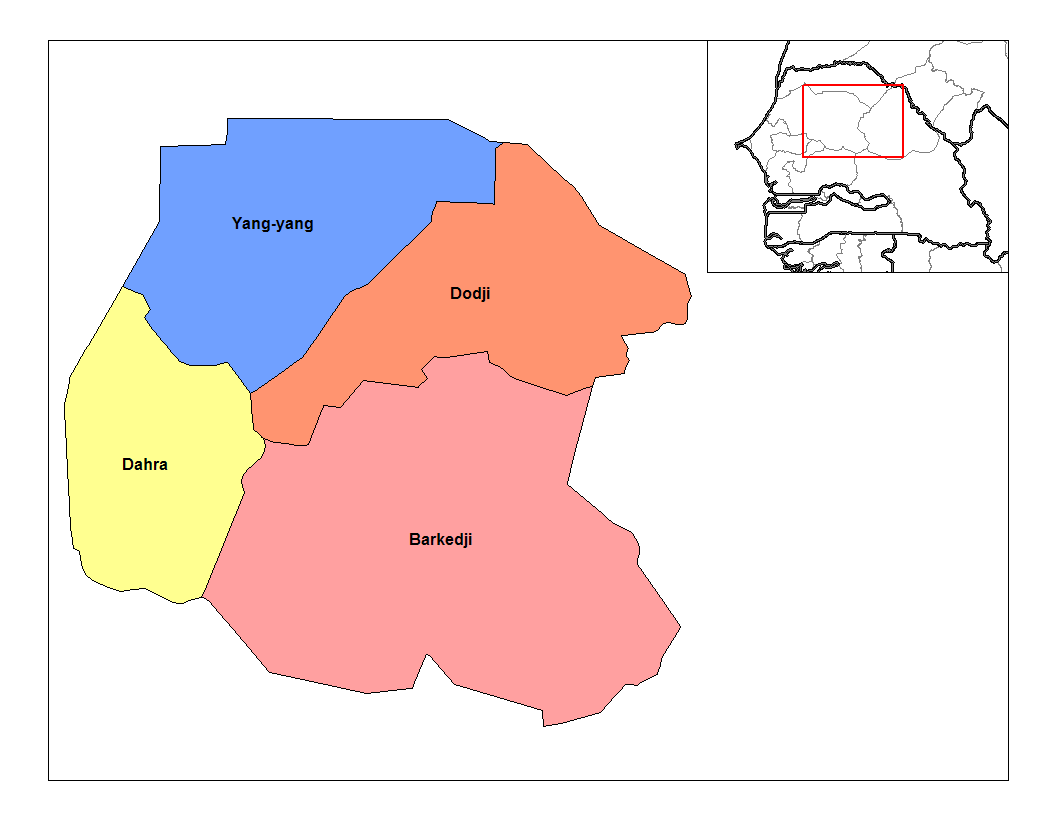
The four arrondissements of Linguère Department.

Linguère department is one of the 46 departments of Senegal, one of the three making up the Louga region. Its capital is Linguère, and it encompasses an area of 15,375 km^{2} (5,936 sq mi).

There are three urban communes in the department; Dahra, Linguère and Mbeuleukhé.

The rural districts (communautés rurales) comprise:

- Barkedji Arrondissement:
  - Barkédji
  - Gassane
  - Thiarny
  - Thiel
- Dodji Arrondissement:
  - Dodji
  - Labgar
  - Ouarkhokh
- Sagatta Djolof Arrondissement:
  - Boulal
  - Dealy
  - Thiamène Pass
  - Sagatta Djolof
  - Affé Djoloff
- Yang-Yang Arrondissement:
  - Kamb
  - Mboula
  - Téssékéré Forage
  - Yang-Yang

== Population ==
As of the December 2002 census, the population was 194,890 inhabitants. In 2005, it was estimated to be 214,883. By 2013 it had grown to 241,898.

== Historic sites ==
- Fortification of Alboury Ndiaye at Yang-Yang
- The Ruins of the Faidherbe Military Post
- The Royal Residence of Yang-Yang
- The Stele commemorating the mosque of the Tata at Yang-Yang
- The Stele commemorating the Guillé battlefield at Mbeuleukhé
