= Kaffrine =

- Town and commune
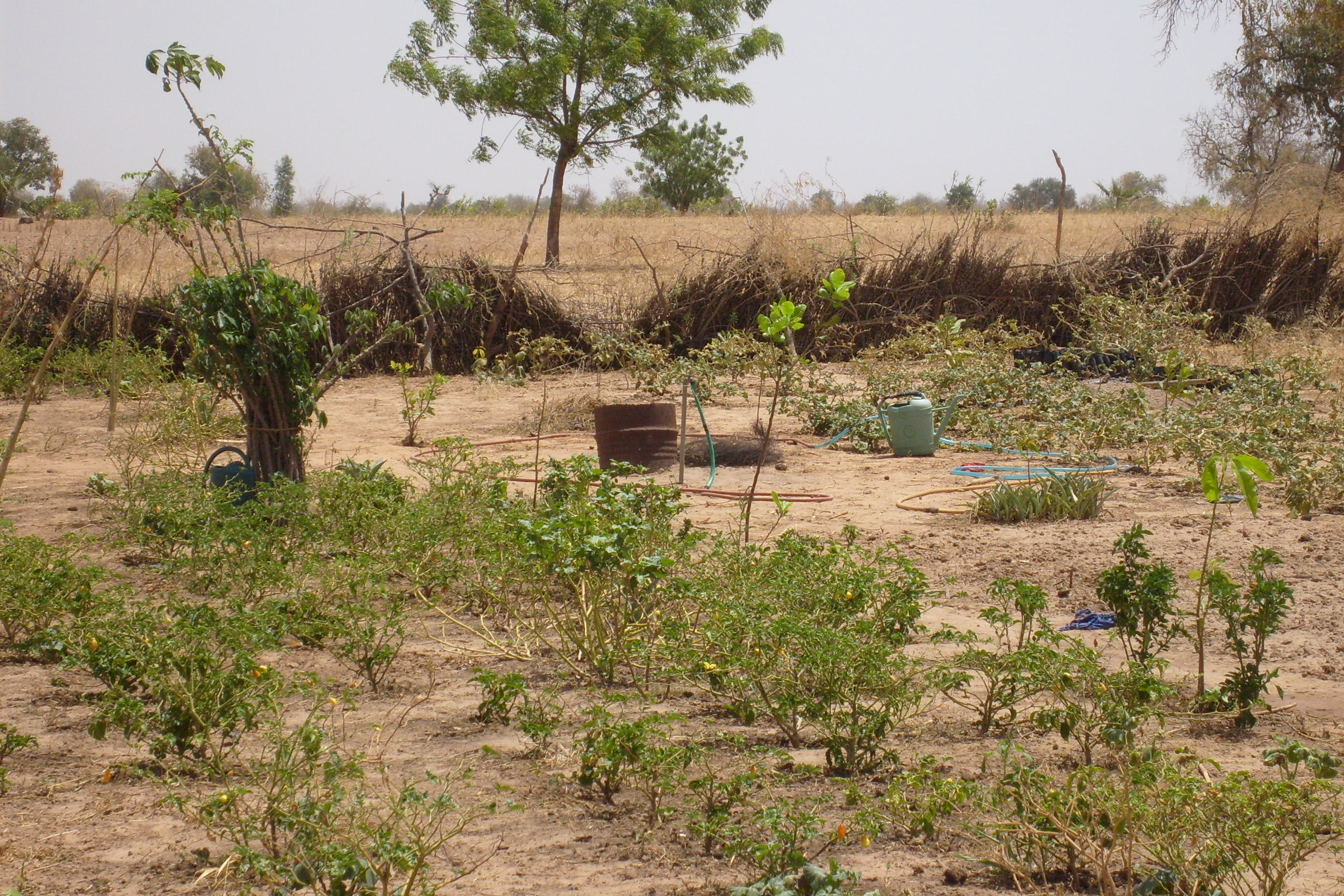

- Location within Senegal
- Coordinates: 14°07′N 15°42′W
- Country: Senegal
- Region: Kaffrine Region
- Département: Kaffrine Department

Area
  - Town and commune: 19.67 km^{2} (7.59 sq mi)

Population (2023 census)
  - Town and commune: 57,307
  - Density: 2,913/km^{2} (7,546/sq mi)
- Time zone: UTC+0 (GMT)

Kaffrine (Wolof: Kafrin) is the capital town of Kaffrine Region of Senegal.

== History ==
There are conflicting stories of Kaffrine's founding, either by a Fula man named Ngange Ka, or by the marabout Saloum Suare. There was an early Serer population in the area. Kaffrine became the capital of the historical region of Ndoucoumane, a former province of the Kingdom of Saloum.I

== Agriculture ==
Kaffrine lies in Senegal's Peanut Basin. Peanuts are the second most common crop for the people of Kaffrine, only behind Millet. Both crops are grown by over 90% of farmers in Kaffrine. Maize is the third most popular crop and grown by over 85% of farmers.

== Climate change ==
Kaffrine will be heavily affected by the changing climate as erratic rainfall will make current farming practices difficult and reduce agricultural production.

== Infrastructure ==
Kaffrine has a station on the Dakar-Niger Railway.

== Notable people ==
- Iba Der Thiam, politician and historian
- Aliou Sow, politician
