= Kaffrine department =

Coordinates: 14°07′00″N 15°42′00″W

Kaffrine
- Department
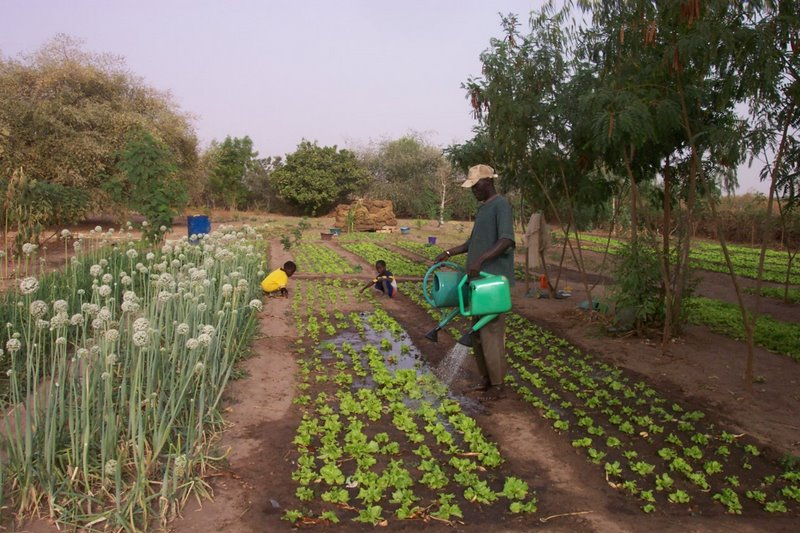

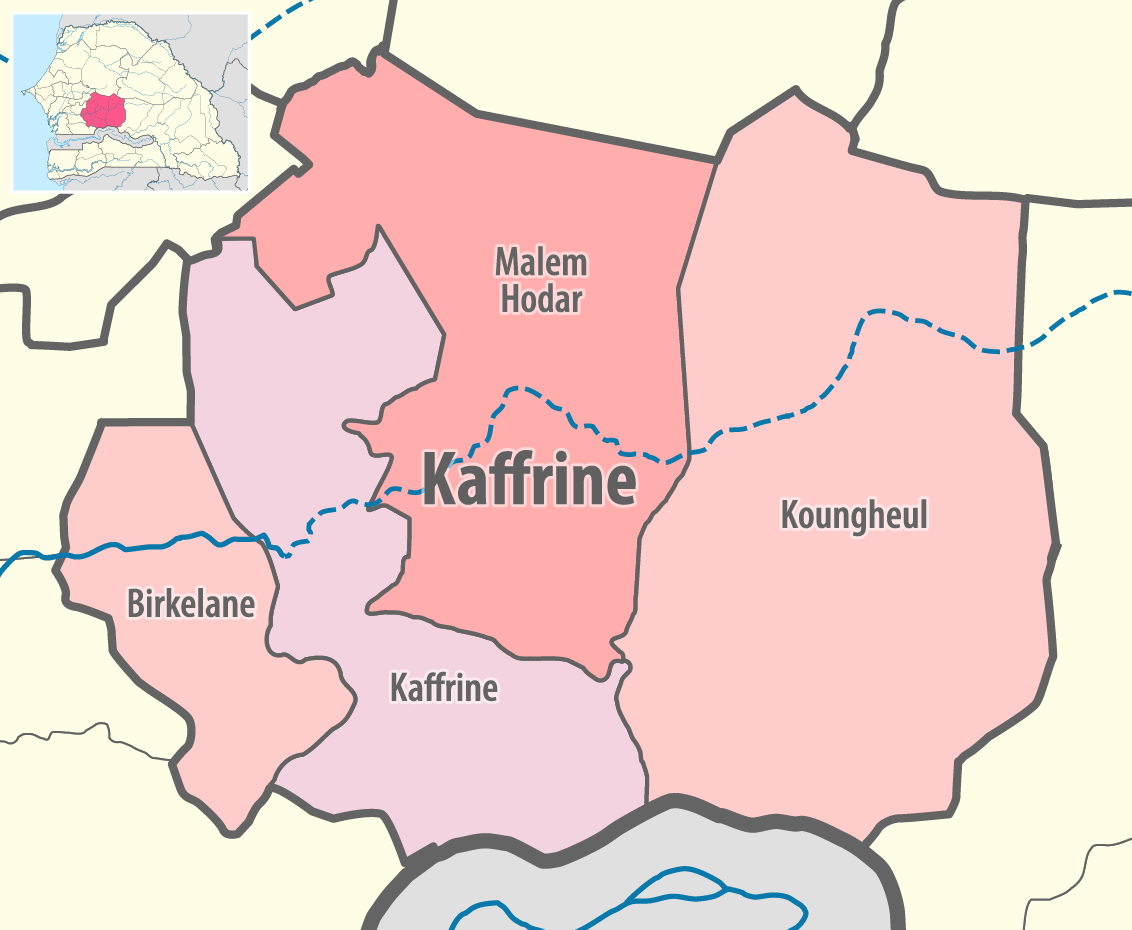
- Location in the Kaffrine Region
- Country: Senegal
- Region: Kaffrine Region
- Capital: Kaffrine

Area
  - Total: 11,102 km^{2} (4,287 sq mi)

Population (2023 census)
  - Total: 280,969
  - Density: 25.308/km^{2} (65.547/sq mi)
- Time zone: UTC+0 (GMT)

Kaffrine department is one of the 46 departments of Senegal, and is located in the Kaffrine Region, formerly part of the Kaolack Region.

The main settlements are the communes of Kaffrine and Nganda. In addition there are the rural communities (Communautés rurales) of Boulel, Diamagadio, Diokoul Mbelbouck, Gniby, Kahi, Kathiotte and Médinatoul Salam.

== Historic sites in Kaffrine department ==
Sources:

- Megalithic site of Keur Ali Ngane
- Megalithic site of Sorokogne
- Megalithic site of Keur Modi Toy
- Megalithic site of Pathé Tiangaye
- Megalithic site of Keur Ali Lobé
- Megalithic site of Kounou Mbayèn
