= Louga region =

Region of Senegal

Louga region Région de Louga (French) Diiwaanu Luga (Wolof)
- Region
- Location of Louga in Senegal

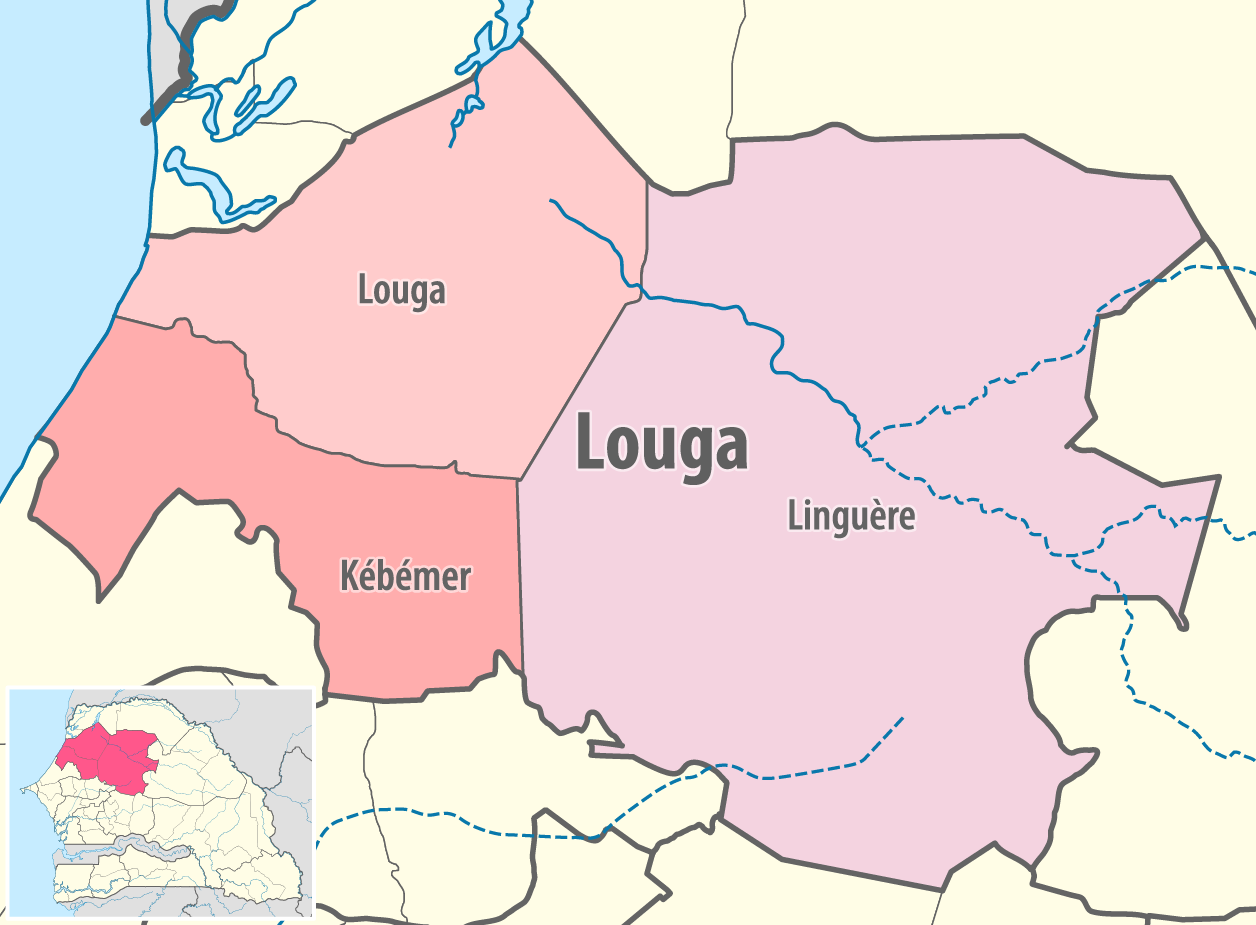
- Louga région, divided into 3 départements
- Coordinates: 15°16′N 15°31′W
- Country: Senegal
- Capital: Louga
- Départements: List: Kébémer; Linguère; Louga

Area
  - Total: 24,889 km^{2} (9,610 sq mi)

Population (2023 census)
  - Total: 1,127,119
  - Density: 45.286/km^{2} (117.29/sq mi)
- Time zone: UTC+0 (GMT)
- HDI (2017): 0.413 low

Louga is a city and region of Senegal. The region is located to the northwest part of the country and Louga city is in the northwest of the region – about 50 km inland from the Atlantic coast.

== Departments ==
Louga region is divided into 3 départements:

- Kébémer département
- Linguère département
- Louga département

== Geography ==
Louga is traversed by the northwesterly line of equal latitude and longitude.

== See also ==
- Dahra
