= Kaffrine region =

Region of Senegal

Kaffrine region Région de Kaffrine (French) Diiwaanu Kafrin (Wolof)
- Region
- Location of Kaffrine in Senegal

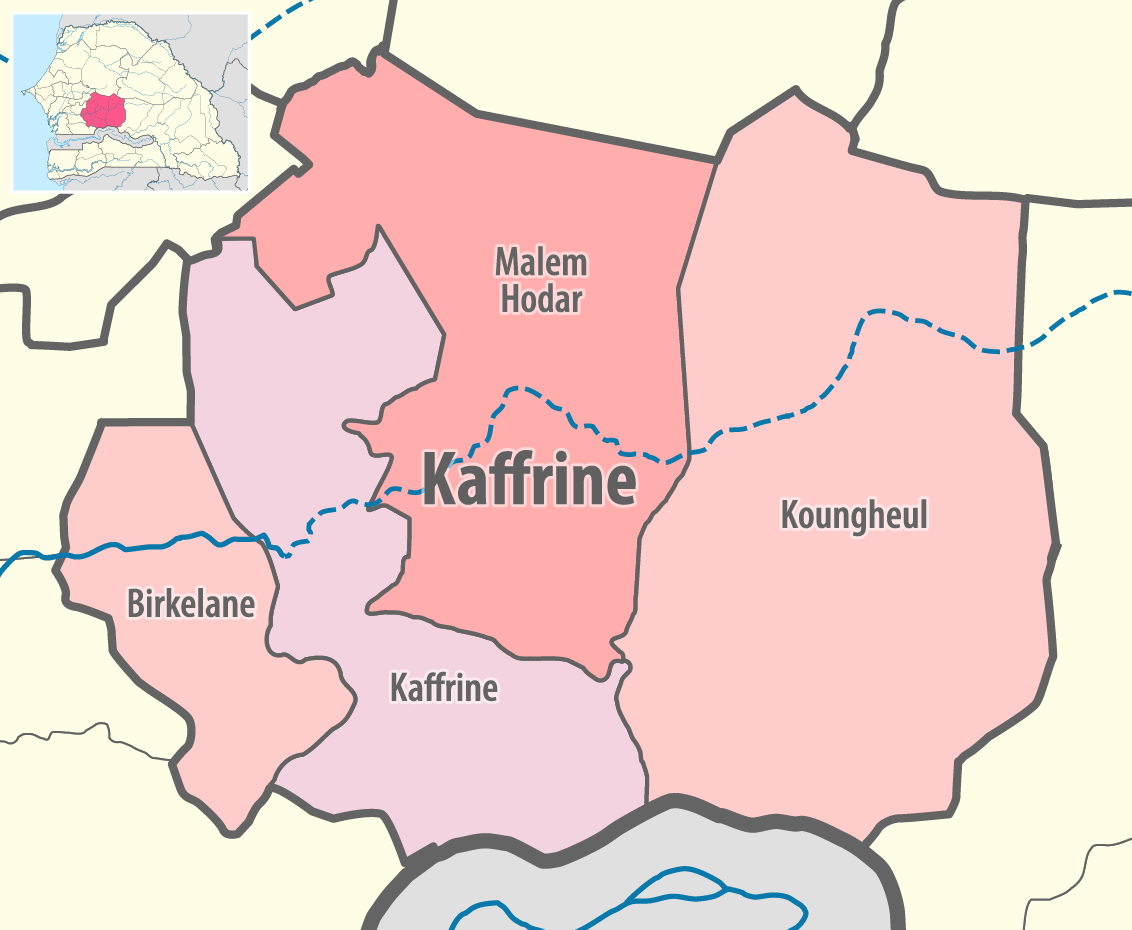
- Kaffrine région, divided into 4 départements
- Coordinates: 14°07′N 15°42′W
- Country: Senegal
- Established: 2008
- Capital: Kaffrine
- Départements: List: Birkilane department; Kaffrine department; Koungheul department; Malem Hoddar department

Government
  - Governor: Fabackry Bodian

Area
  - Total: 11,262 km^{2} (4,348 sq mi)

Population (2023 census)
  - Total: 821,287
  - Density: 72.926/km^{2} (188.88/sq mi)
- Time zone: UTC+0 (GMT)

Kaffrine region is a region of Senegal. It was created in 2008.

== Departments ==
Kaffrine Region has four departments:

- Birkilane département
- Kaffrine département
- Koungheul département
- Malem Hoddar département
