= Regions of Senegal =

Senegal is subdivided into 14 regions (French: régions, singular – région), each of which is administered by a Conseil Régional (pl.: Conseils Régionaux) elected by population weight at the arrondissement level. Senegal is further subdivided into 46 departments, 103 arrondissements (neither of which have administrative function) and by collectivités locales (the 14 regions, 110 communes, and 320 communautés rurales) which elect administrative officers. Three of these regions were created on 10 September 2008, when Kaffrine Region was split from Kaolack, Kédougou region was split from Tambacounda, and Sédhiou region was split from Kolda.

Regions of Senegal

To date, all regions take their name from their regional capitals.

Region	Capital	Area (km^{2})	Population (2023 census)
Dakar	Dakar	547	3,896,564
Diourbel	Diourbel	4,824	1,497,455
Fatick	Fatick	6,849	908,858
Kaffrine	Kaffrine	11,262	821,287
Kaolack	Kaolack	5,357	1,338,671
Kédougou	Kédougou	16,800	245,288
Kolda	Kolda	13,771	916,513
Louga	Louga	24,889	1,127,119
Matam	Matam	29,445	833,657
Saint-Louis	Saint-Louis	19,241	1,204,863
Sédhiou	Sédhiou	7,341	590,784
Tambacounda	Tambacounda	42,364	988,193
Thiès	Thiès	6,670	2,467,523
Ziguinchor	Ziguinchor	7,352	612,343

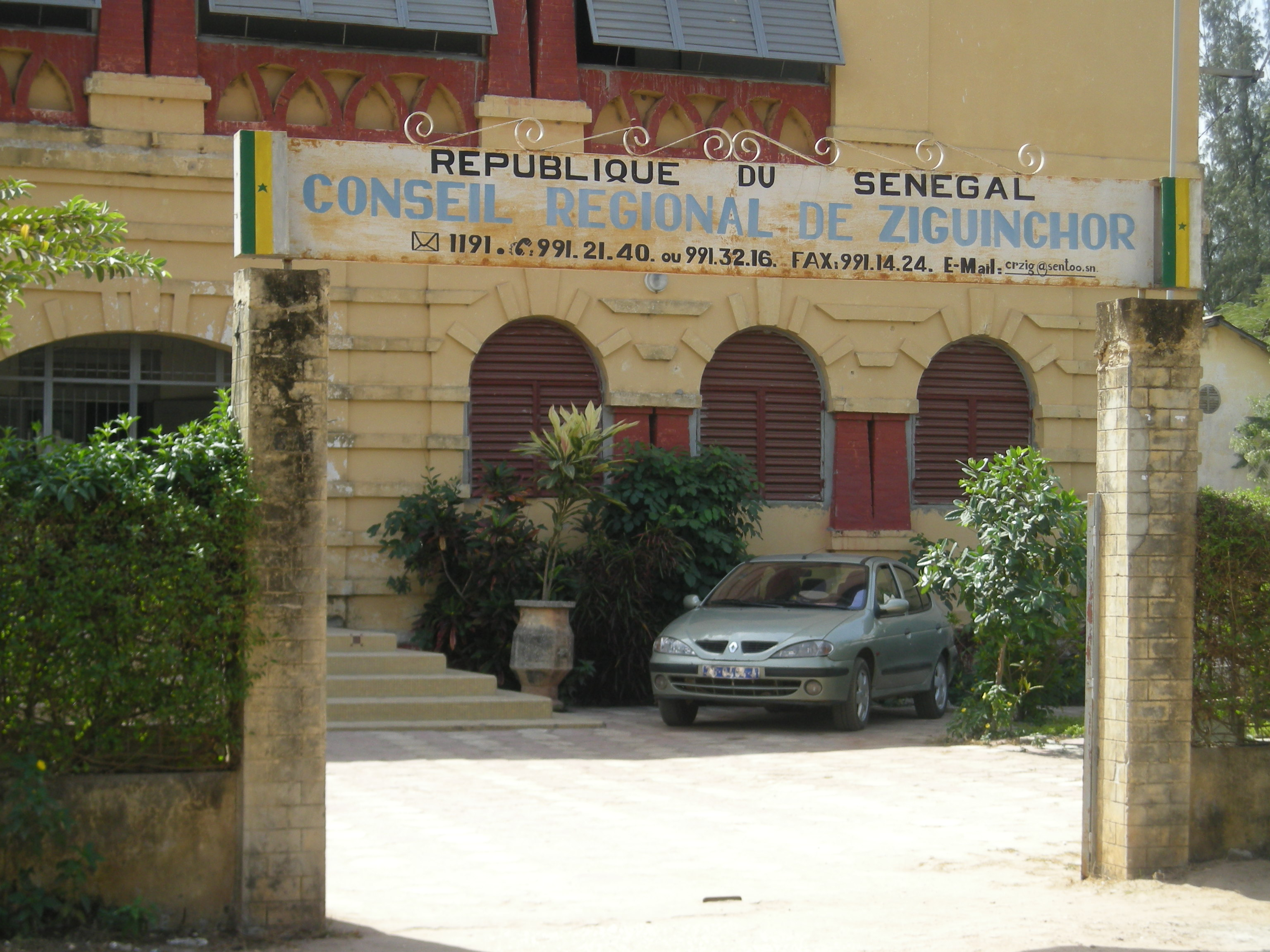
The Conseil Régional building in Ziguinchor. Regions, unlike Departments or Arrondissements (but like Communes), have defined administrative and political power in Senegal.

== See also ==
- List of Senegalese regions by Human Development Index
- Departments of Senegal
- Arrondissements of Senegal
- ISO 3166-2:SN
