= Battle of Fancá =

Battle of Fancá (1886)
- Part of Marques Geraldes's campaign against Musa Molo (1886)
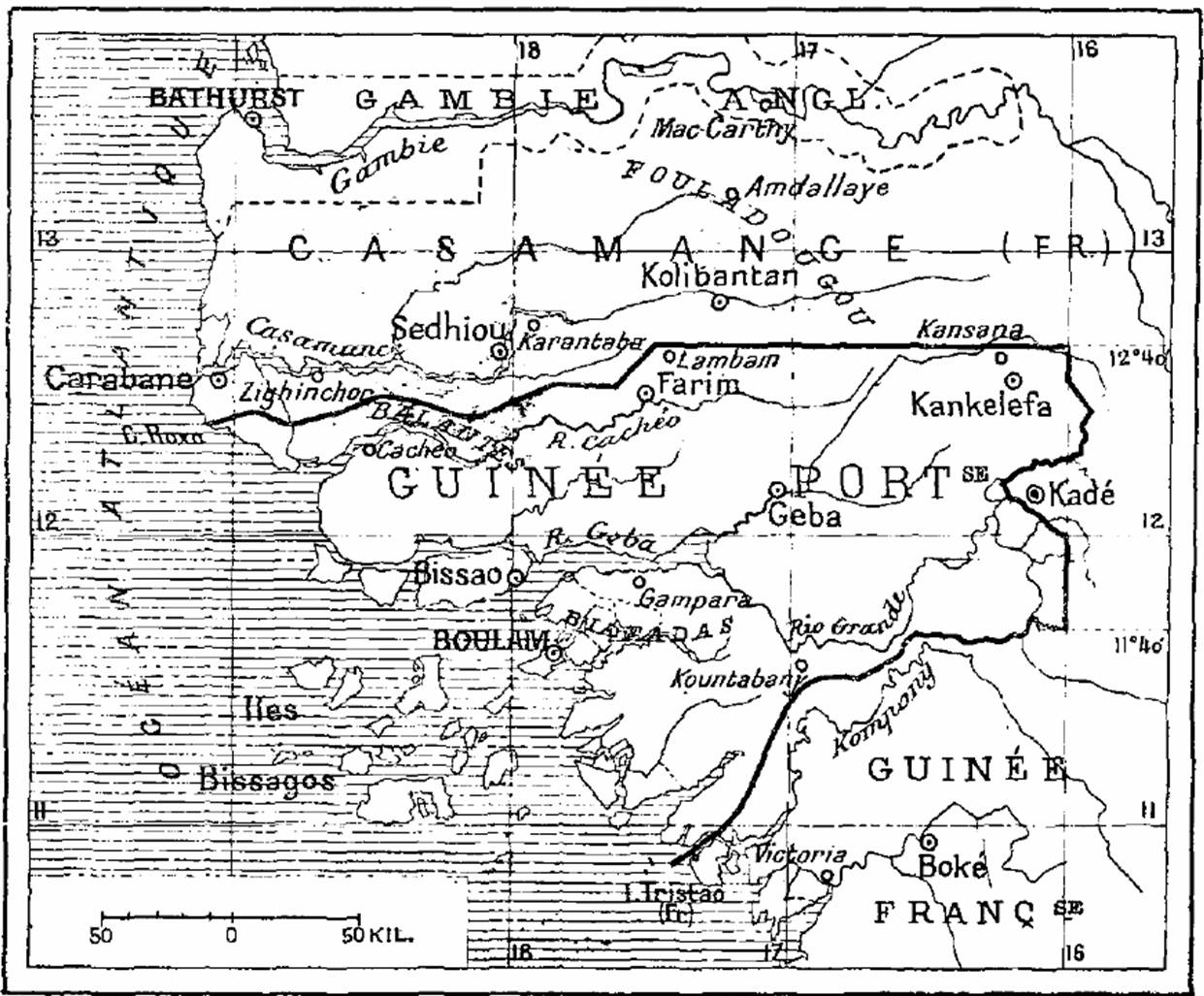
- "Fouladougou" (upper centre) on a 1906 map
Date	6 September 1886 (~3 hours)
Location	Fancá, Kingdom of Fuladu (in present day Guinea-Bissau)
Result	Portuguese-Allied victory

Belligerents
Kingdom of Portugal; Ganadu; Fulas; Mandinkas; Biafadas; Grumetes	Kingdom of Fuladu

Commanders and leaders
Marques Geraldes; Carvalho Vieira; Sebastião Casqueiro; João José Rosa; Gomes de Araújo; António Santy; Nbuku of Ganadu	Musa Molo

Strength
80 Portuguese soldiers 4,300 Fula and Mandinka allies 170 Biafadas; 120 Grumetes; 2 pieces of artillery Total: 4,670 men	Unknown

Casualties and losses
Unknown	Many dead and wounded

The Battle of Fancá (1886) was a military engagement that took place in Fancá, modern-day Gabú, Guinea-Bissau, between Portuguese colonial forces, commanded by Marques Geraldes, supported by local allies under Nbuku, and the forces of Fuladu, led by Musa Molo.

== Background ==
The Fuladu kingdom was founded by Alfa Molo in 1869, after his death in 1881, his brother, Bakari Demba, had succeeded him, and later to Musa Molo, Alfa Molo's son. In Geba, the Portuguese found themselves powerless to counter Musa Molo's demands for taxes and levies. However, by 1886, Nbuku, the ruler of Ganadu and one of Musa Molo's provincial chiefs, had grown discontented with his Musa's rule. Seizing the opportunity, the Portuguese asked the Nbuku to form an alliance against Musa Molo. This alliance was solidified, and preparations began for a coordinated military campaign.

== Battle ==
On 6 September 1886, Lieutenant Francisco António Marques Geraldes, commanding the Portuguese garrison at Geba, led a force of 80 Portuguese soldiers, supported by 4,300 Fula and Mandinka allies, 170 Biafadas, 120 grumetes, and two pieces of artillery. The coalition launched an assault on the fortified tabanca of Fancá.

The battle lasted three hours, during which Musa Molo's forces resisted fiercely but were ultimately overwhelmed. The Portuguese and allied forces forced Musa Molo and his warriors to abandon their positions. Retreating north to Casamance, Musa Molo left behind the dead and wounded.

== Aftermath ==
After their victory, the Portuguese began incorporating parts of Fuladu into the newly proclaimed province of "Guiné Portuguesa." The operations would finish on September 15, but Marques Geraldes would lead another campaign against Musa Molo in 1889–1891.
