= Serer history =

Medieval history of the Serer people of Senegambia

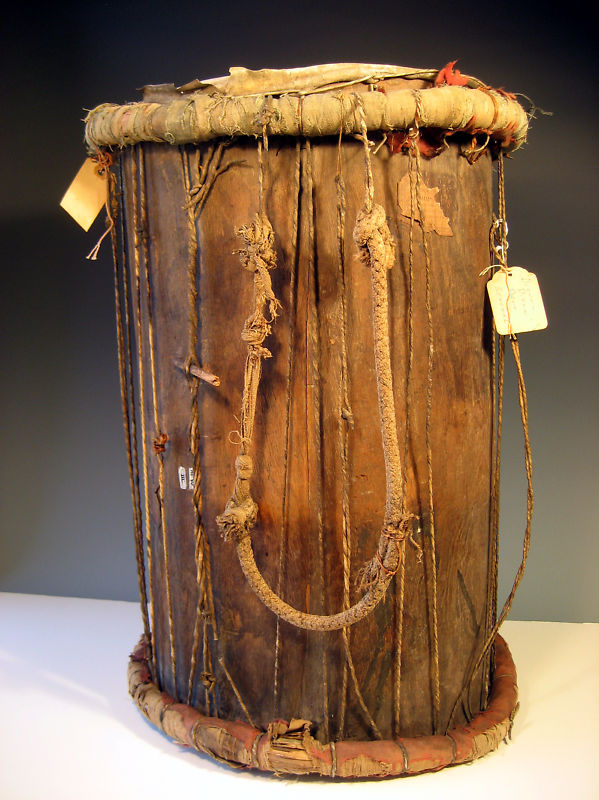
A 19th-century war and ceremonial drum called junjung from the Kingdom of Sine.

The medieval history of the Serer people of Senegambia is partly characterised by resisting Islamization from perhaps the 11th century during the Almoravid movement (which would later result in the Serers of Takrur migration to the south), to the 19th century Marabout movement of Senegambia and continuation of the old Serer paternal dynasties.

== Resistance to Islam, 11th century ==
According to Galvan (2004), "The oral historical record, written accounts by early Arab and European explorers, and physical anthropological evidence suggest that the various Serer peoples migrated south from the Fuuta Tooro region (Senegal River valley) beginning around the eleventh century, when Islam first came across the Sahara." Over generations these people, possibly Pulaar speaking herders originally, migrated through Wolof areas and entered the Siin and Saluum river valleys. This lengthy period of Wolof-Serer contact has left us unsure of the origins of shared "terminology, institutions, political structures, and practices."

Professor Étienne Van de Walle gave a slightly later date, writing that "The formation of the Sereer ethnicity goes back to the thirteenth century, when a group came from the Senegal River valley in the north fleeing Islam, and near Niakhar met another group of Mandinka origin, called the Gelwar, who were coming from the southeast (Gravrand 1983). The actual Sereer ethnic group is a mixture of the two groups, and this may explain their complex bilinear kinship system".

After the Arab invasion of North Africa, the Berbers of the north advanced Islam via the Almoravid movement, penetrating parts of Africa, Europe and Asia. After the fall of the Ghana Empire, the Serers resisted conversion and engaged in the battlefield to defend not only the Serer religion, but also their own power and wealth especially the Serer "Lamanic class" whose wealth and power was achieved through the Lamanic lineage.

The Serer earned their living from agriculture, animal husbandry, fishing, boat building (an ancient Serer tradition) and transporting people over the river.

The jihads that had affected Tekrur in the 11th century which led to the Serers of Tekrur exodus only affected those Serers living in Tekrur at the time. It did not apply to all Serer people. The Serer people are very diverse and spread throughout the Senegambia founding towns and villages, the Serer names of these towns and villages still remain today.

...the Serer traversed vast expanses of territory during pre-colonial times and saw the entire region [the Senegambia region] as their home, as their history of migration in the area clearly shows..

— Godfrey Mwakikagile,

== In Senegambia, southward migration ==
In the Senegambia region, the Serer people were ruled by Lamanes. The Serer who have migrated from Tekrur to join their distant Serer relatives created a southward migration for Mandinka migrants. Godfrey Mwakikagile proposed that the Mandinkas were either defeated in battle or incorporated into Serer society. The Serers ruled over the Wolof kingdom of Jolof. They were ruling Jolof before the Jaw, Ngom, Mengue (or Mbengue) and Njie dynasties (who were all Serers with the exception of the Mengue dynasty who were Lebou – Mengue or Mbengue is a Lebou surname). However, these Serer and Lebou rulers of Jolof (predominantly a Wolof area) became assimilated into Wolof culture.

== Migration from Kabuu to Sine ==
The actual foundation of the Kingdom of Sine is unclear, but in the late 14th century Mandinka migrants entered the area. They were led by a matrilineal clan known as the Gelwaar. Here they encountered the Serer, who had already established a system of lamanic authorities, and established a Gelwaar led state with its capital in or near a Serer lamanic estate centred at Mbissel.

Marriages between the Serer paternal clans such as Faye and Joof to the Guelwar women created the Serer paternal dynasties and a Guelowar maternal dynasty. According to Serer oral tradition a king named Maad a Sinig Maysa Wali Jaxateh Manneh (many variations in spelling: Maissa Wali, Maissa Wally also known as Maysa Wali Jon or Maysa Wali Dione) – (reigned 1350) was the first Guelowar king of Sine. Having served for several years as legal advisor to The Great Council of Lamans and assimilated into Serer culture, he was elected and crowned the firstking of Sine in (1350). His sisters and nieces were married off to the Serer nobility and the offspring of these unions where the kings of Sine and later Saloum (Maad a Sinig and Maad Saloum respectively).

Henry Gravrand reported an oral tradition describing what he called the "Battle of Troubang", a dynastic war between the two maternal royal houses of Ñaanco and the Guelowar, an off-shot and relatives of the Ñaanco (Nyanthio or Nyanco) maternal dynasty of Kaabu, in modern-day Guinea Bissau. In reporting this tradition, Henry Gravrand did not notice that this is actually a description of the 1867 (or 1865) Battle of Kansala.

== King Njaajan Njie ==
Njaajan Njie (English spelling in the Gambia; Ndiadiane/Ndiandiane Ndiaye or 'N'Diadian N'Diaye – French spelling in Senegal; or Njaajaan Njaay – in Serer; also known as 'Amudu Bubakar b. Umar is the traditional founder of the Jolof Empire.

According to Serer tradition, his father was Lamane Boukar Ndiaye (Serer proper: Buka Njaay), a Serer from Waalo, and his mother Fatoumata Sall, a Toucouleur woman, was the daughter of the Lamtoro Ambraham Sall of Takrur. The name 'Abu Bakr' whom the Wolof refer to as his father's name would have arisen as a corruption of the Serer name 'Boukar' (Serer: Buka) Historians such as Professors Cheikh Anta Diop, Egbuna P. Modum, amongst others argue that his father was of possible Serer ancestry rather than Arab, as advanced by the Wolof. The Wolof themselves, claim that their knowledge about this King are derived from Serer sources. Traditional stories of the ancestry of this leader varies. For more on that, see Ndiadiane Ndiaye.

== Defeat of Portuguese slave raiders ==
In 1446, a Portuguese caravel carrying the Portuguese slave trader - Nuno Tristão and his party attempted to enter Serer territory in order to carry out slave raiding. None of the adult passengers of that caravel survived. They all succumbed to Serer poisoned arrows except five young Portuguese (or fewer). One of them was left with the task to charter the caravel back to Portugal. Nuno was amongst those killed.

== 19th century Marabout Movement ==
The Battle of Fandane-Thiouthioune also known as The Battle of Somb was a religious war (but also partly motivated by conquest – empire building) between the Muslim Marabout movement of Senegambia and the Serer people of Sine. On 18 July 1867, the leader of the Marabouts Maba Diakhou Bâ launched a jihad in the Serer Kingdom of Sine but was defeated and killed by the forces of Maad a Sinig Kumba Ndoffene Famak Joof, King of Sine.

Maba Diakhou, a rather charismatic leader in the Marabout sect saw the propagation of Islam in Senegambia and an Islamic empire as his divine mission. Although he did not achieve an Islamic empire, he had managed to conquer several villages in Senegal and Gambia and his movement was responsible for the Islamization of many Senegambians.

== The effects of Islam ==
Although by the end of the twentieth century most Serer had converted to Islam (about 85% by the 1990s), Serer people's medieval to 19th century history in resisting Islamization has created a division between "believers" of Islam and "non-believers" such as the orthodox Serers who adhere to Serer religion. Klein notes that :

"The most important factor dividing the peoples of Senegambia was the differential impact of Islam. In this, the Serer stood out as the one group that had undergone no conversion." (Martin A. Klein)

This division is not just religious but also has an ethnic dimension. As opponents of Islam for nearly a millennium, anti-Serer sentiments are not uncommon. However, the Serer countries, especially the Sine area of Senegal, is reported to be a true bastion of the anti-Islamic.

== Present ==
At present, the Serer population is estimated to be over 1.8 million based on population figures for Senegal, Gambia and Mauritania (2011) – excluding the Serers living in the West and elsewhere. They are more numerous in Senegal than in Gambia and Mauritania. Though traditionally mixed-farmers, boat builders and land owners, the Serers are found in all major professions including politics, medicine, literature, commerce, law, agriculture, etc. Polyculture and boat building is still practiced by some Serers. Due to their Lamanic land inheritance system, they tend to have valuable land. Recently however, President Abdoulaye Wade's land reform law has affected many Serer farming communities in Senegal and they've lost their properties.

== See also ==
- Serer ancient history
- Timeline of Serer history
- Roog (Serer deity)
- Serer religion
- Serer people

== Bibliography ==
- Becker, Charles, "Vestiges historiques, trémoins matériels du passé clans les pays sereer"', Dakar, 1993., CNRS – ORS TO M
- Asante, Molefi K., "The history of Africa: the quest for eternal harmony", Routledge (2007), ISBN 0-415-77139-0
- Mwakikagile, Godfrey, "Ethnic Diversity and Integration in the Gambia: The Land, the People and the Culture", (2010), ISBN 9987-9322-2-3
- Mwakikagile, Godfrey, "The Gambia and Its People: Ethnic Identities and Cultural Integration in Africa", (2010), ISBN 9987-16-023-9
- Klein, Martin A., "Islam and Imperialism in Senegal Sine-Saloum, 1847-1914", Edinburgh University Press (1968), ISBN 0-85224-029-5
- Gravrand, Henry, "La Civilisation sereer, Cossan – les origines", vol. 1, Nouvelles Editions africaines (1983), ISBN 2-7236-0877-8
- Gravrand, Henry "La civilisation Sereer, Pangool", Nouvelles Editions africaines du Sénégal (1990), ISBN 2-7236-1055-1
- Sarr, Alioune, "Histoire du Sine-Saloum", (Sénégal), Introduction, bibliographie et notes par Charles Becker, BIFAN, Tome 46, Serie B, n° 3–4, 1986–1987
- Diouf, Niokhobaye, "Chronique du royaume du Sine", (Sénégal), Suivie de notes sur les traditions orales et les sources écrites concernant le royaume du Sine par Charles Becker et Victor Martin. (1972). Bulletin de l'Ifan, Tome 34, Série B, n° 4, (1972)
- Phillips, Lucie Colvin, "Historical dictionary of Senegal", Scarecrow Press (1981), ISBN 0-8108-1369-6
- Clark, Andrew F. & Philips, Lucie Colvin, "Historical Dictionary of Senegal", Second Edition, Scarecrow Press (1994), ISBN 0-8108-2747-6
- Institut fondamental d'Afrique noire. Bulletin de l'Institut fondamental d'Afrique noire, Volume 38. IFAN, 1976.
- Gamble, David P., & Salmon, Linda K. (with Alhaji Hassan Njie), Gambian Studies No. 17. "People of The Gambia. I. The Wolof" (with notes on the Serer and the Lebou), San Francisco 1985
- Stride, G. T., Ifeka, Caroline, "Peoples and empires of West Africa: West Africa in history, 1000-1800", Africana Pub. Corp., (1971),
- Lombard, Maurice, "The golden age of Islam", Markus Wiener Publishers (2003), ISBN 1-55876-322-8
- Page, Willie F., "Encyclopedia of African history and culture: African kingdoms (500 to 1500)", Vol.2, Facts on File (2001), ISBN 0-8160-4472-4
- Hopkins, J. F. P., Levtzion, Nehemia, "Corpus of early Arabic sources for West African history" ("al-'Umari in Levtzion and Hopkins," eds. and trans. "Corpus"), Markus Wiener Publishers (2000), ISBN 1-55876-241-8
- Hopkins, J. F. P., & Levtzion, Nehemia, "Corpus of Early Arabic Sources for West African History", Cambridge University Press (1981). (Scholar)
- Streissguth, Thomas, "Senegal in Pictures, Visual Geography", Second Series, Twenty-First Century Books (2009), ISBN 1-57505-951-7
- Ajayi, J. F. Ade & Crowder, Michael, "History of West Africa", Vol. 1, Longman (1985), ISBN 0-582-64683-9
- Holt, Peter Malcolm, "The Indian Sub-continent, south-East Asia, Africa and the Muslim West", Vol. 2, Part 1, Cambridge University Press (1977), ISBN 0-521-29137-2
- Oliver, Roland Anthony, Fage, J. D., "Journal of African history", Volume 10, Cambridge University Press (1969)
- Catchpole, Brian, Akinjogbin, I. A., "A history of West Africa in maps and diagrams", Collins Educational (1983)
- Trimingham, John Spencer, "A history of Islam in West Africa", Oxford University Press, USA (1970)
- Woodson, Carter Godwin, "The African background outlined: or, Handbook for the study of the Negro", The Association for the Study of Negro Life and History, inc., (1936)
- Ayalon, David, & Sharon, Moshe, "Studies in Islamic history and civilization: in honour of Professor David Ayalon", BRILL (1986), ISBN 965-264-014-X
- Olson, James Stuart, "The peoples of Africa: an ethnohistorical dictionary", Greenwood Publishing Group (1996), ISBN 0-313-27918-7
- Behrman, Lucy C., "Muslim brotherhoods and politics in Senegal", Harvard University Press (1970)
- Buah, F. K., "West Africa since A.D. 1000: history notes", Volumes 1–2, Macmillan
- "An introduction to the history of West Africa", p 21, CUP Archive
- Diouf, Mamadou, & Leichtman, Mara, "New perspectives on Islam in Senegal: conversion, migration, wealth, power, and femininity", Palgrave Macmillan (2009), the University of Michigan, ISBN 0-230-60648-2
- Diouf, Mamadou, "History of Senegal: Islamo-Wolof model and its outskirts", Maisonneuve & Larose (2001), ISBN 2-7068-1503-5
- "The African archaeological review", Volumes 17–18, Plenum Press (2000)
- Gregg, Emma, Trillo, Richard "Rough guide to the Gambia", Rough Guides (2003), ISBN 1-84353-083-X
- Julien, Charles André, & Le Tourneau, Roger, "Histoire de L'Afrique du Nord", vol. 2, Praeger (1970)
- Institut fondamental d'Afrique noire. Bulletin, Volumes 26–27. IFAN (1964)
- Institut fondamental d'Afrique noire. Mémoires de l'Institut fondamental d'Afrique noire, Issue 91, Part 2. IFAN (1980)
- Diouf, Marcel Mahawa, "Lances mâles: Léopold Sédar Senghor et les traditions Sérères, Centre d'études linguistiques et historiques par tradition orale (1996)
- Sonko-Godwin, Patience, "Ethnic groups of the Senegambia: a brief history", Sunrise Publishers (1988), ISBN 9983-86-000-7
- Oliver, Roland; Fage, John Donnelly, & Sanderson, G. N., "The Cambridge History of Africa", Cambridge University Press, 1985. ISBN 0-521-22803-4
- Faal, Dawda, "Peoples and empires of Senegambia: Senegambia in history, AD 1000-1900", Saul's Modern Printshop (1991)
- Galvan, Dennis C., "The state must be our master of fire: how peasants craft sustainable development in Senegal", University of California Press (2004), ISBN 978-0-520-23591-5
- Gastellu, Jean-Marc, L'égalitarisme économique des Serer du Sénégal. Volume 128, Travaux et documents de l'ORSTOM. IRD Editions (1981) ISBN 2-7099-0591-4
- Ngom, Biram, (Babacar Sédikh Diouf [in] Biram Ngom), "La question Gelwaar et l’histoire du Siin", Dakar, Université de Dakar (1987)
- Boulègue, Jean, "Le Grand Jolof, (XVIIIe – XVIe Siècle)", (Paris, Edition Façades), Karthala (1987)
- Dyao, Yoro, "Légendes et coutumes sénégalaises", Cahiers de Yoro Dyao: publiés et commentés par Henri Gaden, (E. Leroux, 1912)
- Comité scientifique international pour la rédaction d'une histoire générale de l'Afrique, "Histoire générale de l'Afrique", UNESCO (1980), ISBN 92-3-201710-5
- Innes, Gordon; Suso, Bamba; Kanute, Banna; & Kanute, Dembo, "Sunjata : three Mandinka versions", Psychology Press (1974), ISBN 0-7286-0003-X
- Gravrand, Henry, "Le Gabou dans les traditions orales du Ngabou", Éthiopiques 28 special issue No. "socialist journal of Black African culture" (1981)
- Colvin, Lucie Gallistel, "Historical Dictionary of Senegal", Scarecrow Press/ Metuchen. NJ – London (1981) ISBN 0-8108-1885-X
- Éthiopiques, Volume 2, Grande imprimerie africaine (1984)
- (Ning & Sain 1972) [in] Colvin, Lucie Gallistel, "Historical Dictionary of Senegal", Scarecrow Press/ Metuchen. NJ – London (1981) ISBN 0-8108-1885-X
- Anyidoho, Kofi, "Cross rhythms", Volume 1, "Occasional papers in African folklore", Trickster Press (1983)
- Taal, Ebou Momar, "Senegambian Ethnic Groups:" Common Origins and Cultural Affinities Factors and Forces of National Unity, Peace and Stability, (2010)
- Foltz, William J., "From French West Africa to the Mali Federation", Volume 12 of Yale studies in political science, Yale University Press (1965)
- Diop, Anta Cheikh & Modum, Egbuna P., "Towards the African renaissance: essays in African culture & development", 1946–1960, Karnak House (1996), ISBN 0-907015-85-9
- Hair, Paul Edward Hedley, "The Use of African Languages in Afro-European contacts in Guinea : 1440-1560", [in] "Sierra Leone Language Review", no. 5, (1966)
- Hair, Paul Edward Hedley, "Africa encountered: European contacts and evidence, 1450-1700", Variorum, 1997, ISBN 0-86078-626-9
- Coifman, Victoria Bomba, "History of the Wolof state of Jolof until 1860 including comparative data from the Wolof state of Walo", University of Wisconsin - Madison (1969)
- Hindson, Ed & Caner, Ergun, "The Popular Encyclopedia of Apologetics: Surveying the Evidence for the Truth of Christianity", Harvest House Publishers (2008) ISBN 0-7369-2084-6
- Ham, Anthony, "West Africa", Lonely Planet (2009), ISBN 1-74104-821-4
- Messier, Ronald A., "The Almoravids and the meaning of jihad", ABC-CLIO (2010), ISBN 0-313-38589-0
- Powell, John, "Magill's Guide to Military History: A-Cor", Salem Press, (2001), ISBN 0-89356-015-4
- Johnson, G. Wesley, "The emergence of Black politics in Senegal: the struggle for power in the four communes, 1900-1920", Stanford University Press (1971), ISBN 0-8047-0783-9
- "Research in African literatures", Volume 37. University of Texas at Austin. African and Afro-American Studies and Research Center, University of Texas at Austin, African and Afro-American Studies and Research Center, University of Texas (at Austin) (2006)
- Lipschutz, Mark R., & Rasmussen, R. Kent, "Dictionary of African historical biography", p 128, 2nd Edition, University of California Press (1989), ISBN 0-520-06611-1
- Senate (U.S) Committee on Foreign Relations, "Annual Report on International Religious Freedom", (2004), Compiled by State Dept. (U.S.), Government Printing Office (2005), ISBN 0-16-072552-6
- Grolier Incorporated, "The encyclopedia Americana", Volume 12, Grolier (2000), ISBN 0-7172-0133-3
- Azumah, John Alembillah, "The legacy of Arab-Islam in Africa:" a quest for inter-religious dialogue, neworld (2001), ISBN 1-85168-273-2
- Thiaw, Issa Laye, "La Religiosité des Sereer, Avant et Pendant Leur Islamisation", Éthiopiques, No: 54, Revue Semestrielle de Culture Négro-Africaine. Nouvelle Série, Volume 7, 2e Semestre 1991.
- Thiam, Iba Der, "Maba Diakhou Bâ Almamy du Rip" (Sénégal), Paris, ABC, Dakar-Abidjan, NEA, (1977)
- Blanchet, Gilles "Élites et changements en Afrique et au Sénégal", ORSTOM (1983)
- Ubink, Janine M; Hoekema, André J; & Assies, Willem J, "Legalising Land Rights: Local Practices, State Responses and Tenure Security in Africa, Asia and Latin America", Amsterdam University Press, 2010. ISBN 90-8728-056-4
