= Bansang =

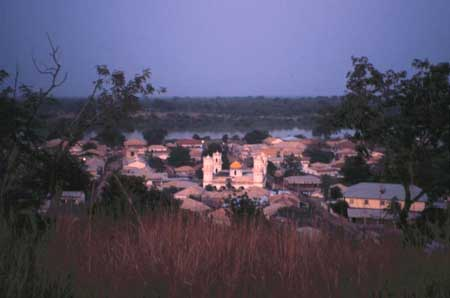

- Location in the Gambia
- Coordinates: 13°26′N 14°39′W
- Country: The Gambia
- Division: Central River Division
- District: Fulladu West
- Founded: 1262
- Re-settled: 1920s

Population (2012)
  - Total: 8,843
- Time zone: UTC+0 (GMT)

Bansang is a town in the Central River Division of the Gambia, with a population of 8,843 (2012). Although the official government center of the Division is located in Janjanbureh downstream, Bansang has better access to the more affluent coastal region of the country, and is sometimes considered the unofficial "upcountry" economic capital.

The town is a market for peanuts, rice and fish.

== History ==
According to legend, Bansang was founded as Ba-Sansango, meaning 'river tata' in the early 1260s, during Tiramakhan Traore's migration into the Gambia River valley. The area became part of the kingdoms of Jimara and Wuropana, constituent states of the Kaabu empire. In the 1860s the Fula kingdom of Fuladu rose as Kaabu declined.

By the late 19th century, Bansang was merely a wharf and river-crossing point. It became an important settlement during the colonial period as families settled there to take advantage of opportunities in the growing trade of peanuts on the Gambia River. Mandinka people were the first to resettle the place, followed by Fula and Wolof in the 20th century. The village began as a seasonally inhabited trading post, until the first compound was founded by a prosperous local trader, Bakary Darboe, in the 1920s. His family was followed by relatives of Musa Molloh Balde, former ruler of Fuladu.

== Gallery ==
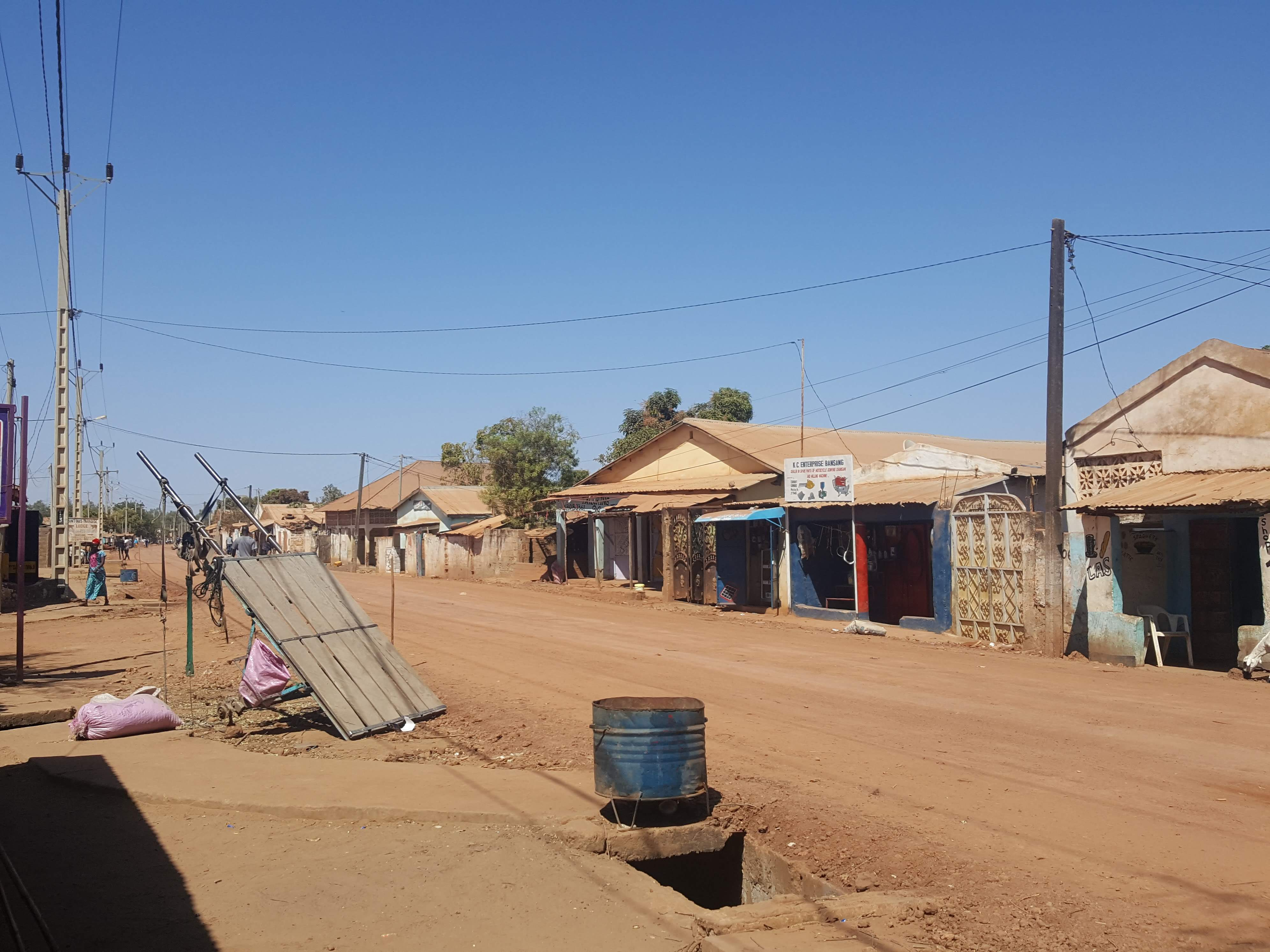
The main street in Bansang

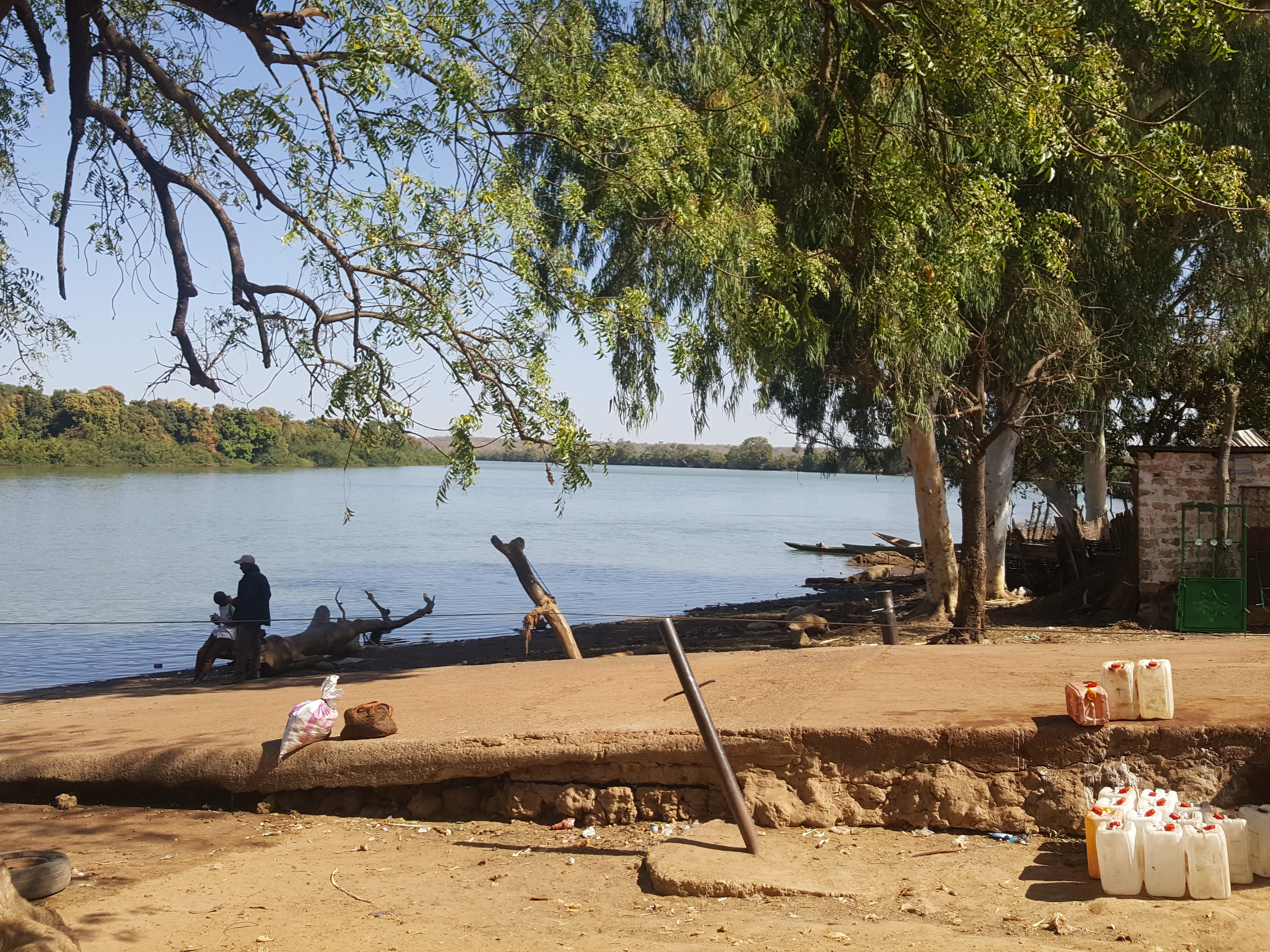
Upstream view of the River Gambia

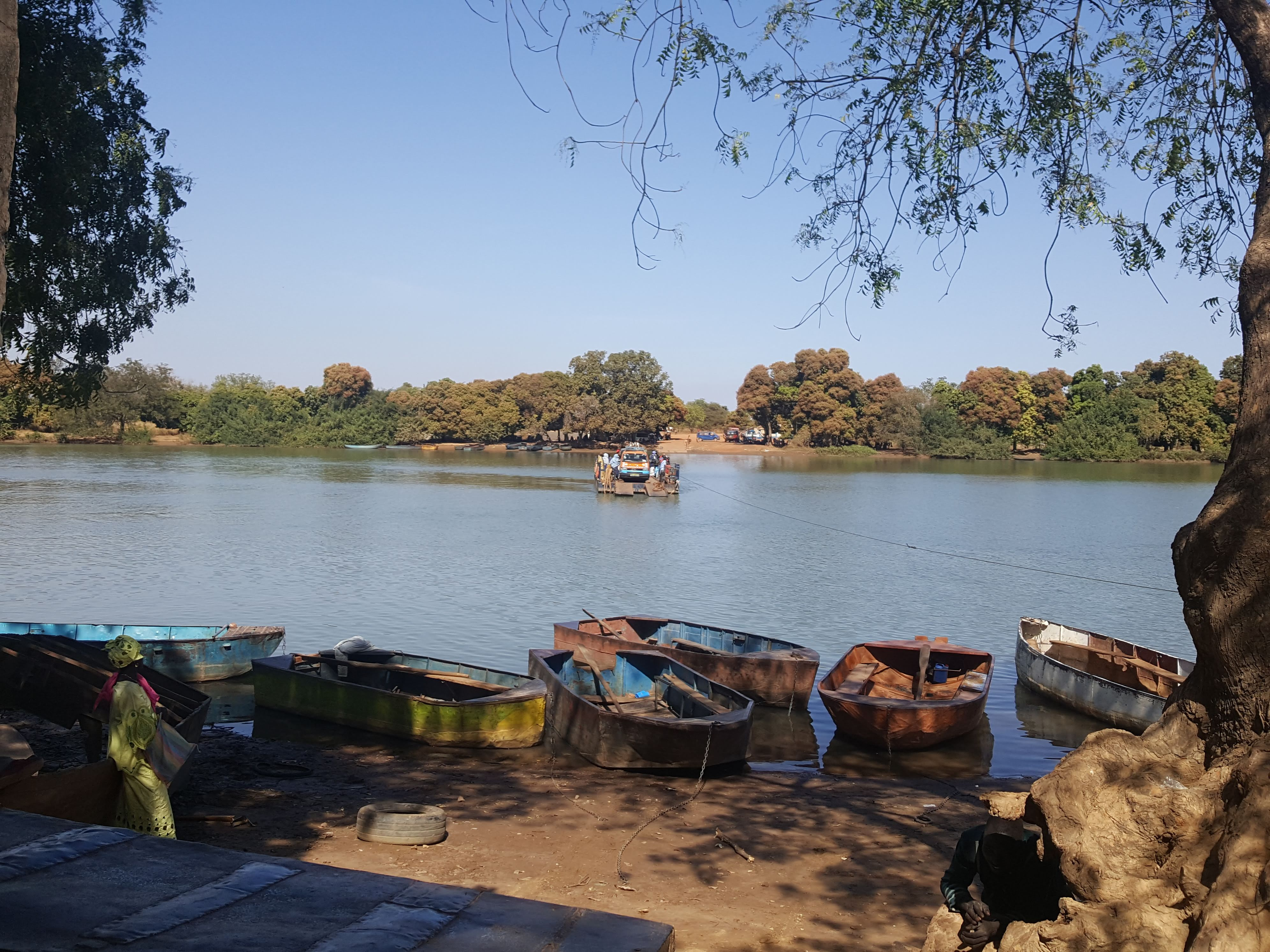
The manually-operated vehicle ferry across the river

== Sources ==
- The Atlas of the Gambia
