= Battle of Buaró =

Battle of Buaró (1886)
- Part of Marques Geraldes's campaign against Musa Molo (1886)
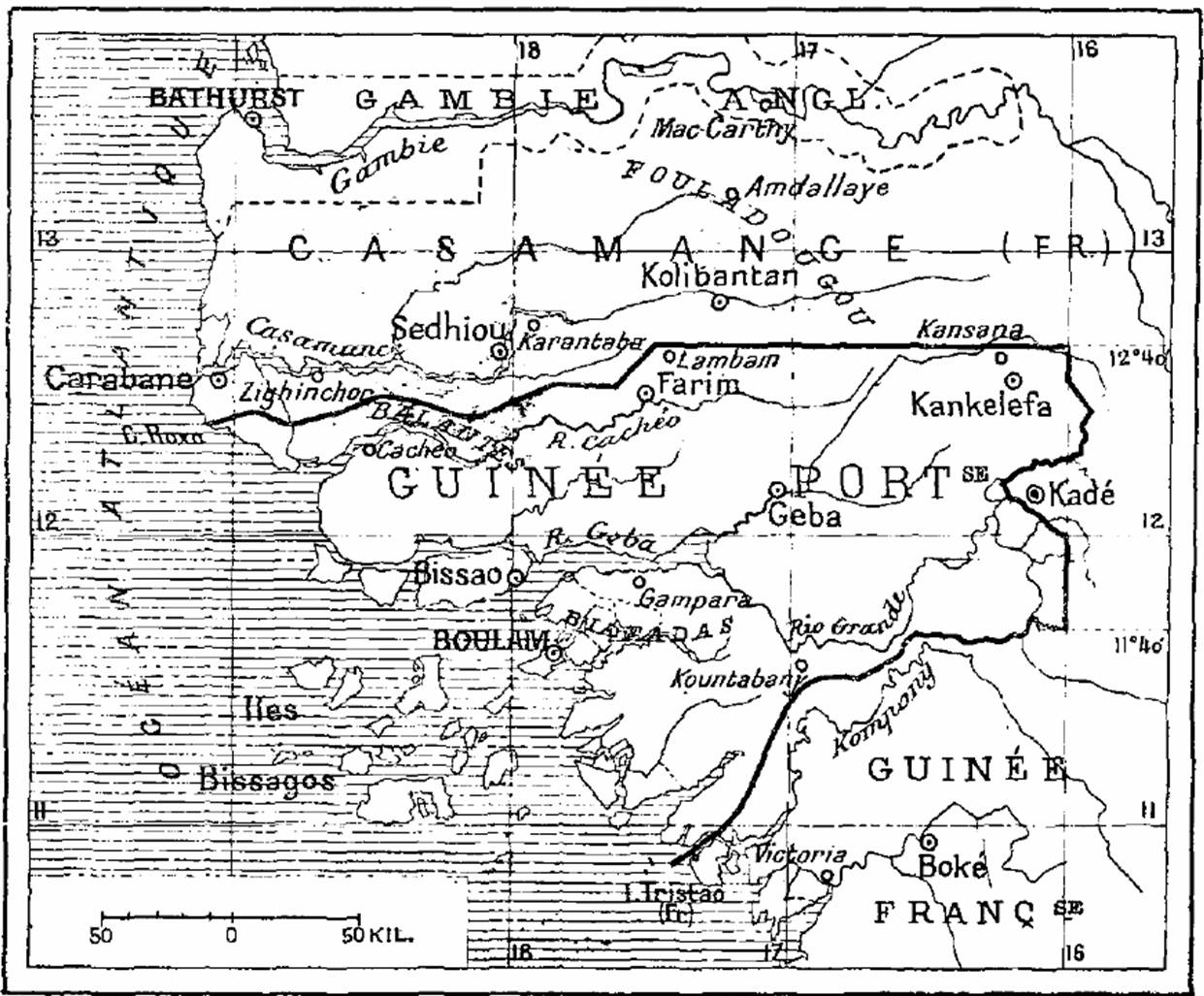
- "Fouladougou" (upper centre) on a 1906 map
Date	1886 (~4 hours)
Location	Buaró, Mansomine, Kingdom of Fuladu (in present day Guinea-Bissau)
Result	Portuguese victory

Belligerents
Kingdom of Portugal	Kingdom of Fuladu

Commanders and leaders
Marques Geraldes; Carvalho Vieira; Umbucu	Musa Molo; Musa's chiefs

Strength
910 combatants	Unknown

Casualties and losses
3 dead 5 wounded	Heavy

The Battle of Buaró (1886) was a military engagement fought in the fortified village of Buaró, Guinea-Bissau, between Portuguese colonial forces, led by Marques Geraldes, supported by Umbucu, and the forces of Fuladu, commanded by Musa Molo's chiefs.

== Background ==
Following the victory at the battle of Mansomine, Geraldes and his allies faced a risky situation. Despite the lack of reinforcements from the colonial governor, Gomes Barbosa, who refused to give support, Geraldes decided to press on. The region was tense, with the Umbucu rallying 800 auxiliaries to join 40 soldiers under Alferes Amaral Carvalho Vieira and 70 grumetes, forming a column of 910 men.

Musa Molo was accidentally wounded, so his chiefs led his force, he anticipated the expedition and fortified a stronghold at Buaró, deep within the territory of Mansomine. The location was strategically chosen, and all régulos from the region coordinated their forces to repel the Portuguese column, there vigilant enemy scouts patrolled the terrain.

== Battle ==
After setting camp at Cheuvel, Geraldes carefully planned his advance, avoiding paths prone to ambush. Guided by locals familiar with the terrain, the column approached Buaró undetected until they emerged from the jungle onto the plain where the fortified tabanca stood.

The battle began with a fierce exchange of fire as the Portuguese forces positioned their artillery on the column's left flank. An attempt to reposition the artillery closer to the enemy resulted in it being abandoned under heavy fire, with 5 grumetes severely wounded. Seizing the moment, the enemy cavalry launched an attack, forcing Geraldes to dispatch reinforcements to stabilize the line.

Returning to the abandoned artillery, Geraldes and 4 soldiers managed to recover and reposition the piece. A well aimed shot from the artillery broke through the enemy defenses, killing six defenders. The remaining forces either fled or were cut down in close combat. After four hours of intense fighting, the tabanca fell.

== Aftermath ==
The victory allowed Geraldes's forces to conduct a series of raids in the surrounding territory, destroying four tabancas over the next three days. The forces of Pata Jedé and Sambel Nhantá did not dare to offer resistance after the defeat at Buaró.
