= Battle of Mansomine =

- Part of the Campaigns of Pacification and Occupation
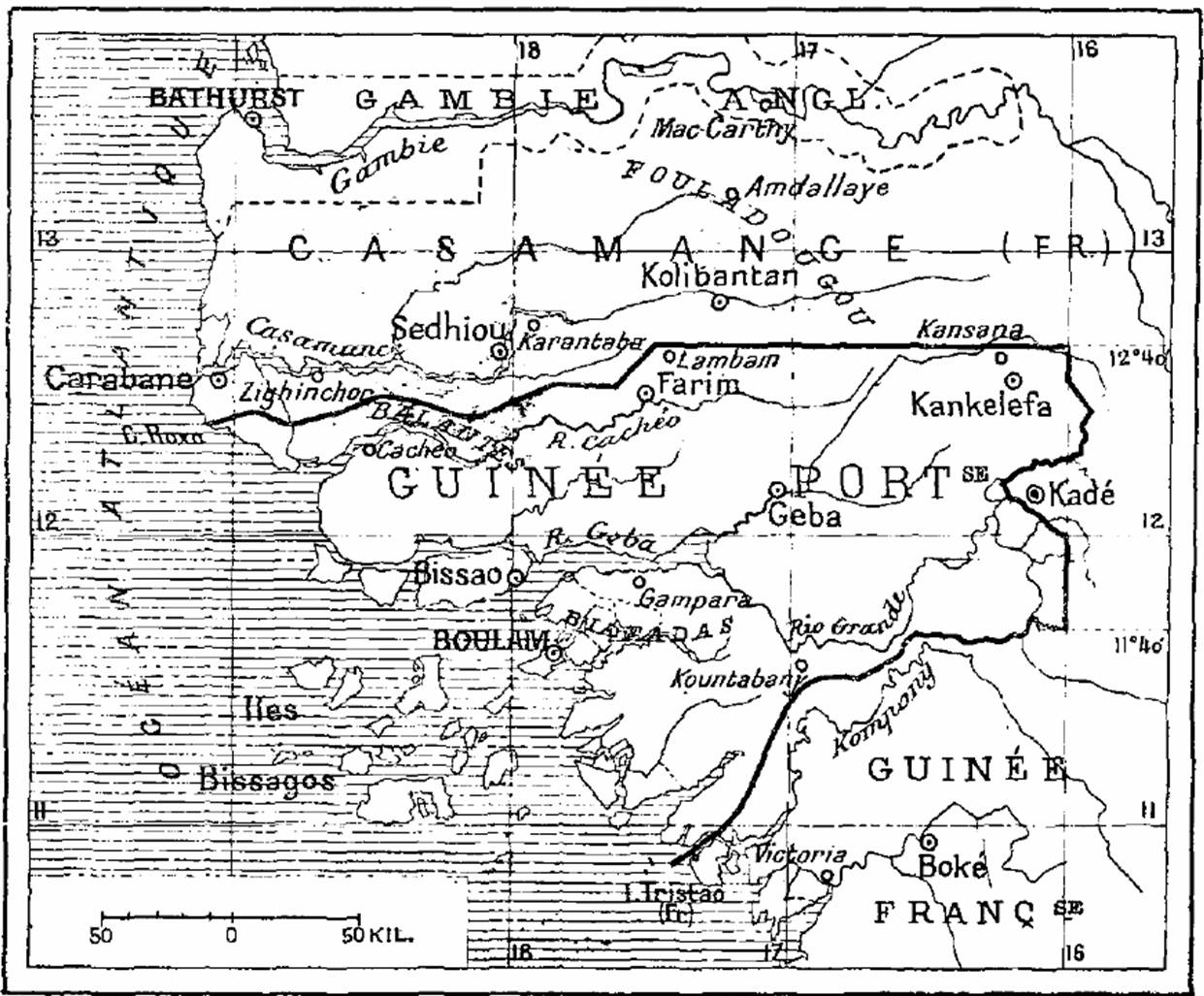
- "Fouladougou" (upper centre) on a 1906 map
Date	July 1886
Location	Mansomine, Kingdom of Fuladu (in present day Guinea-Bissau)
Result	Portuguese victory

Belligerents
Kingdom of Portugal; Fulberibe rebels	Kingdom of Fuladu

Commanders and leaders
Marques Geraldes; João José Rosa; Gomes de Araújo; Fulberibe chiefs; Umbucu	Musa Molo

Strength
180 men belonging to Umbucu; 20 atiradores 70 grumetes 5 merchants 1 artillery piece	Unknown

Casualties and losses
3 dead 5 wounded	Heavy

The Battle of Mansomine was a military engagement fought in 1886 near the village of Mansomine, Guinea-Bissau, between Portuguese colonial forces, commanded by Francisco António Marques Geraldes, supported by Umbucu, and the forces of Fuladu, led by Musa Molo.

== Background ==
The situation in the region of Mansomine, north of the Geba River, was tense, with two enemy villages resisting Portuguese expansion. Operationally, Geraldes's plan was improvised, relying on the element of surprise. He gathered a small force of 20 marksmen, 70 native auxiliaries, five traders, and a single artillery piece before marching from Geba towards Umbucu in July 1886, who commanded 180 men to defend the border.

== Battle ==
On the morning of July 1886, Geraldes and his small force set off from Geba, traveling through difficult terrain. It took them eight hours to reach the camp of their ally, Umbucu, who commanded 180 men. They arrived at 9:00 AM and prepared for an afternoon attack, scheduled for 3:00 PM, after resting and scouting the area.

The enemy's defenses were formidable. The small village of Mansomine was fortified with large tree roots forming natural walls, and a moat surrounded it. Inside, enemy marksmen were positioned behind these barriers, with small openings to observe and fire at any approaching forces. The village was the forward post of a larger palisade, located across a large lagoon.

The Portuguese began their assault by using the artillery piece to break the enemy's defenses. However, it took two hours to destroy the structure due to the artillery's limited firing capacity, only four shots could be fired due to wet gunpowder. Despite the resistance, the defenders were mostly killed.

In an effort to avoid prolonged combat within the enemy's stronghold, Geraldes implemented a clever ruse. Part of the force feigned a retreat, drawing the enemy out of their position and into the open. Meanwhile, the rest of the force, commanded by traders João José Rosa and Domingos Gomes Araújo, flanked the enemy through the woods and crossed the lagoon at a shallow point. The flanking force attacked the main palisade from the rear, setting it ablaze.

By the time the enemy realized the trap, it was too late. Overcome by the disorganized pursuit of the retreating forces, they fled in panic. Many were killed in the final hand-to-hand combat and the subsequent confusion. The Portuguese suffered three dead and five wounded, while the enemy lost a significant number of men.

== Aftermath ==
The victory at Mansomine encouraged Geraldes, who proposed a combined operation to further secure the river's trade routes. However, the Governor, Gomes Barbosa, declined support, citing a lack of troops and resources. Undeterred, Geraldes, with the support of Umbucu, continued his campaign alone.

== See also ==
- Portuguese Guinea
