= Mahmadu Lamine =

Tijani marabout

Mahmadu Lamine Drame
- Born: c. 1835; Goundiourou, Mali
- Died: December 12, 1887 near Ngogo-Soukouta, Gambia
- Occupation: marabout
- Known for: Resistance to French colonialism in western Senegal

al-Hajj Mahmadu Lamine Drame, also known as Ma Lamine Demba Dibassi, (died 9 December 1887) was a nineteenth-century Tijani marabout who led a series of rebellions against the French colonial government in what is now Senegal.

== Early life, education, and hajj ==
Mahmadu Lamine Drame was born between 1835 and 1840 at Goundiourou, near Kayes in what is now Mali. Educated in the Qur'an first by his father, a cleric, Lamine also studied at Tabajang in Casamance and Bunumbu in Kantora before later studying under Fodé-Mohammed-Saloum at Bakel. As a youth he participated in a jihad against the Tenda, but was captured, held for several years, and whipped.

Upon his release sometime after 1850 he traveled to Ségou, where he met Umar Tall and may have served him. Some time between 1864 and 1874, Lamine went on a hajj, likely leaving Ségou a while after the death of Umar Tall and returning between 1878 and 1880. Upon his return, he was imprisoned by Tall's son Ahmadu Tall. In 1885 Tall's son Madani freed him.

The political situation during Mahmadu Lamine's three rebellions

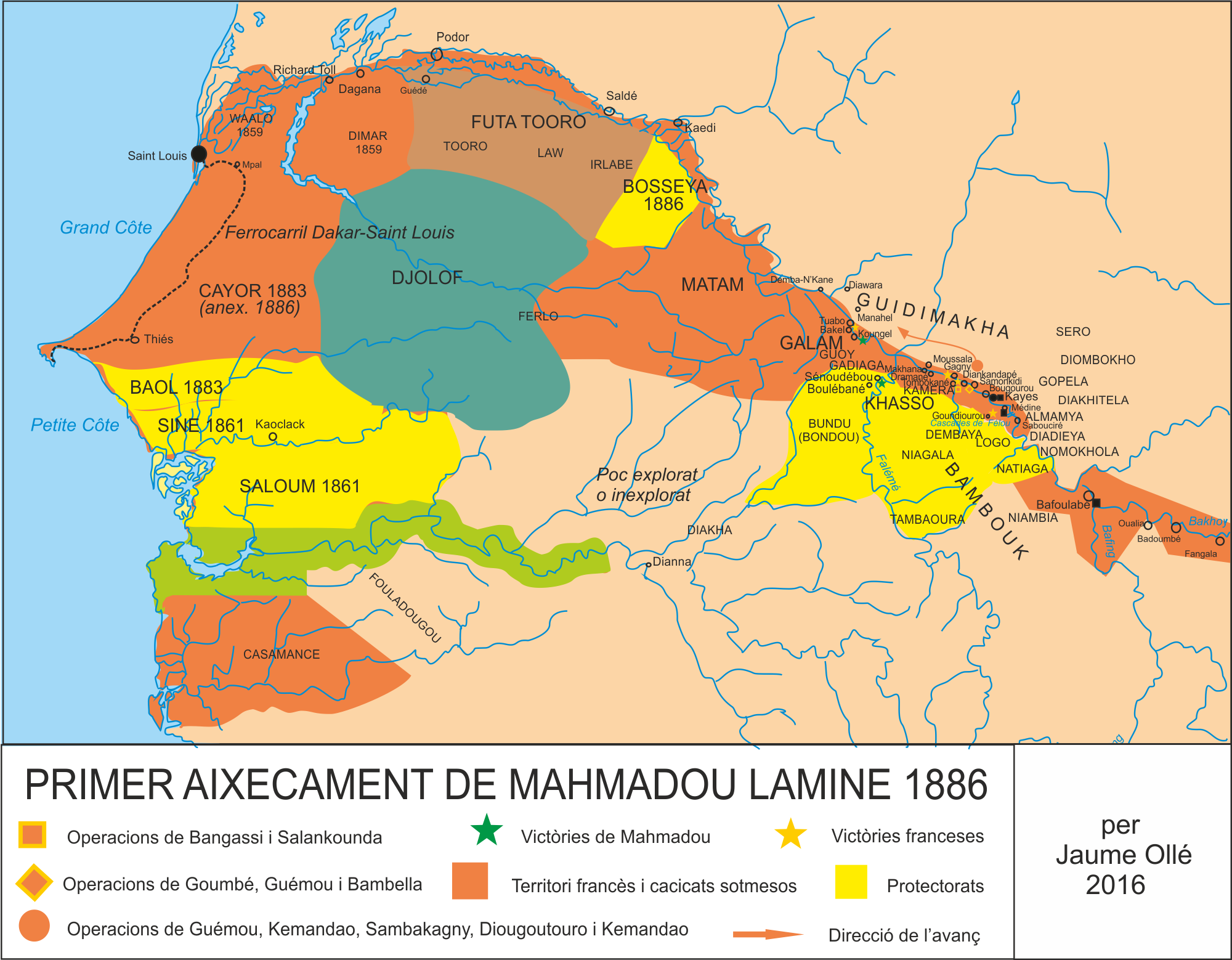
1886

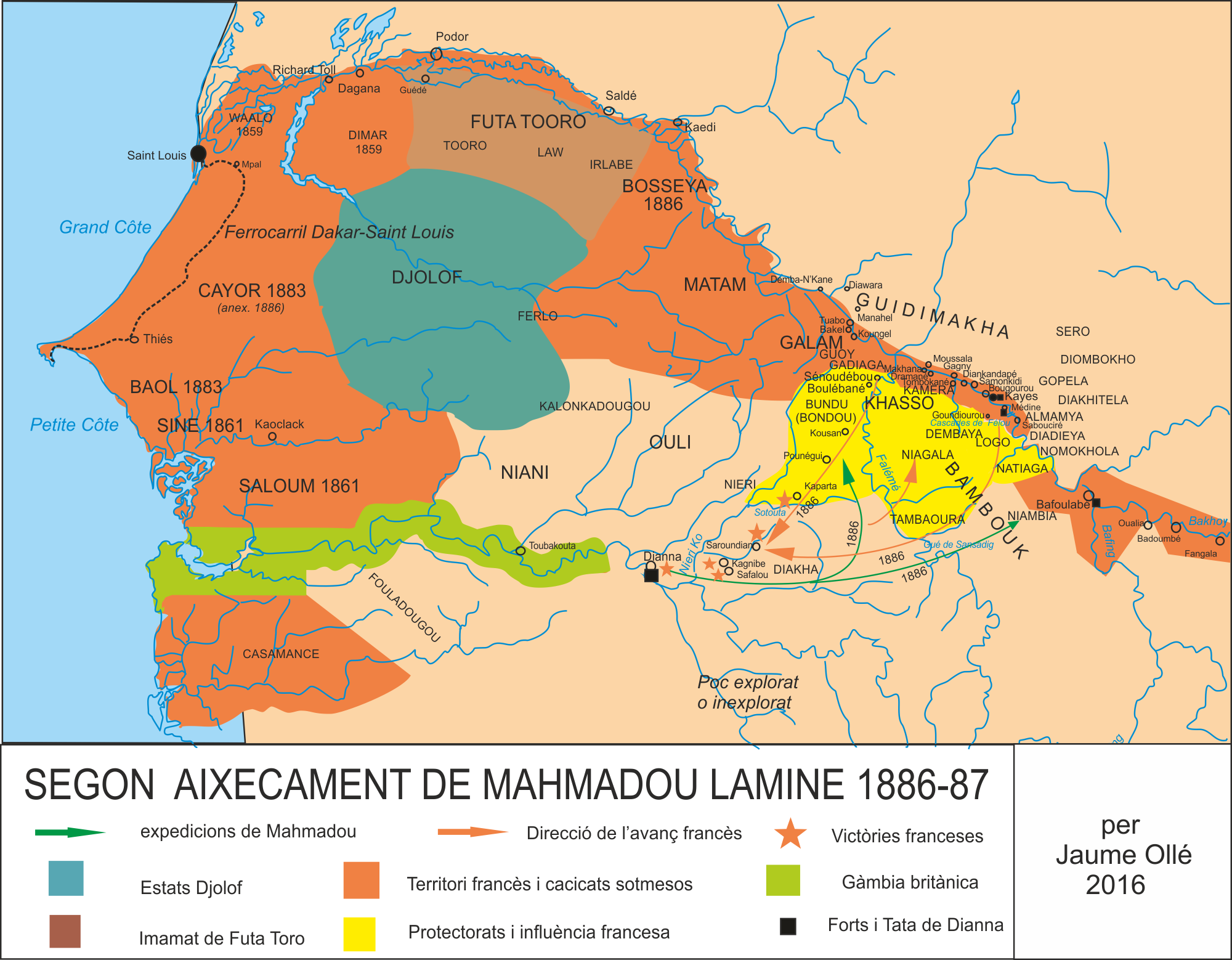
1886-1887

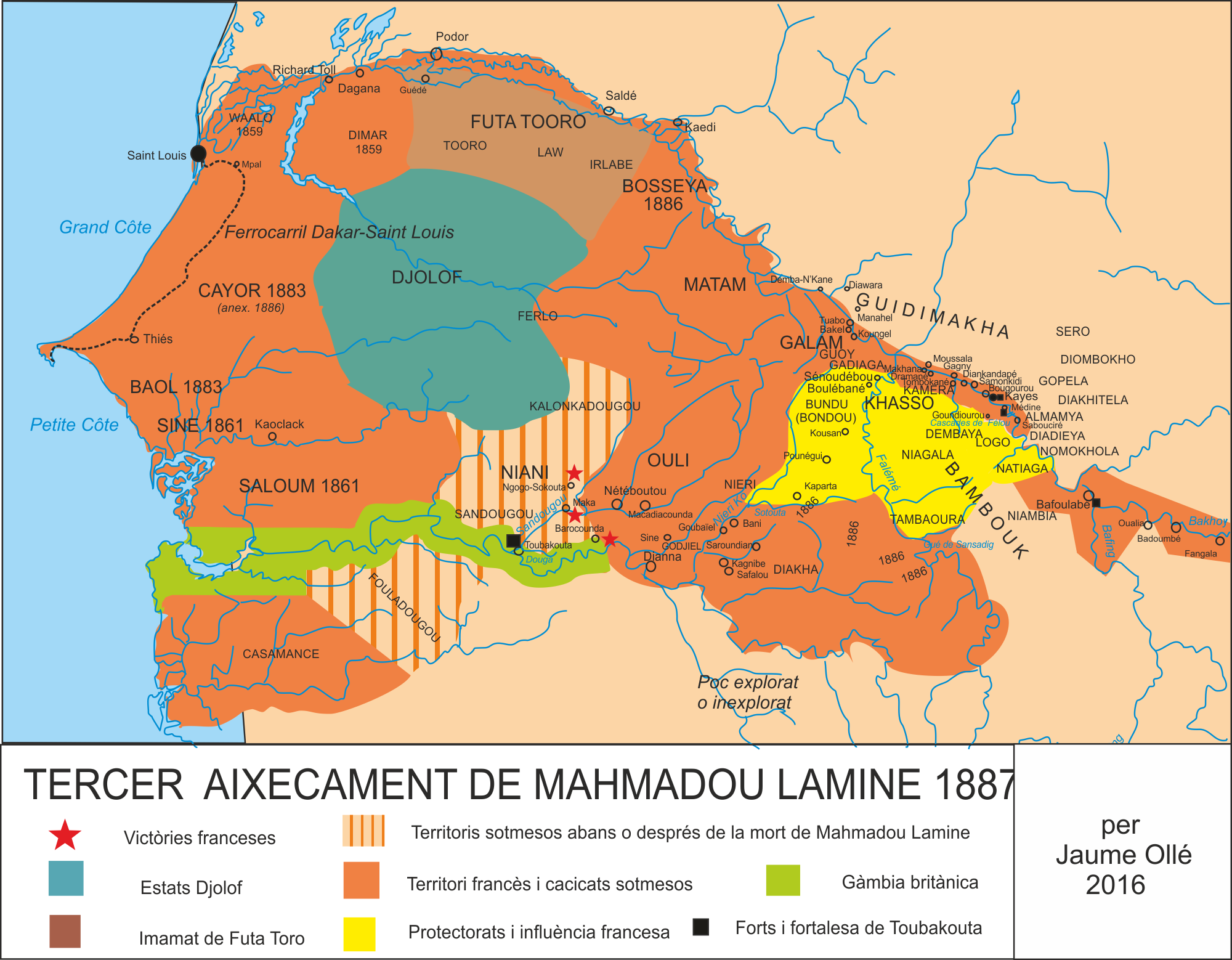
1887

== Uprising ==
Lamine returned to the Upper Senegal and began gathering followers, his claims of friendship with the French notwithstanding. He soon proclaimed a jihad against Tenda. When Omar Penda, the new French-aligned almamy of Bundu, refused him passage, Lamine captured the capital of Boulibani in February 1886. In response, the French seized his wives, children, and belongings in Goundiourou.

Between April 1 and 4, 1886, the marabout's forces besieged the French in their fort at Bakel, but the siege was broken by reinforcements coming from Kayes and he retreated south. The French, supported by Toucouleur and Moorish auxiliaries, burned a hundred villages in the area in revenge. Mahmadu Lamine's son Souaiybou, left behind to continue the fight in the Senegal River valley, where he was besieged for five months in the tata of Gori from December 1887 to March 1888 by Ahmadu Tall. When the fortress fell he fled, but the Toucouleurs eventually caught up to Souaiybou at Gouthioube and executed him. The French would later claim credit for killing the young man.

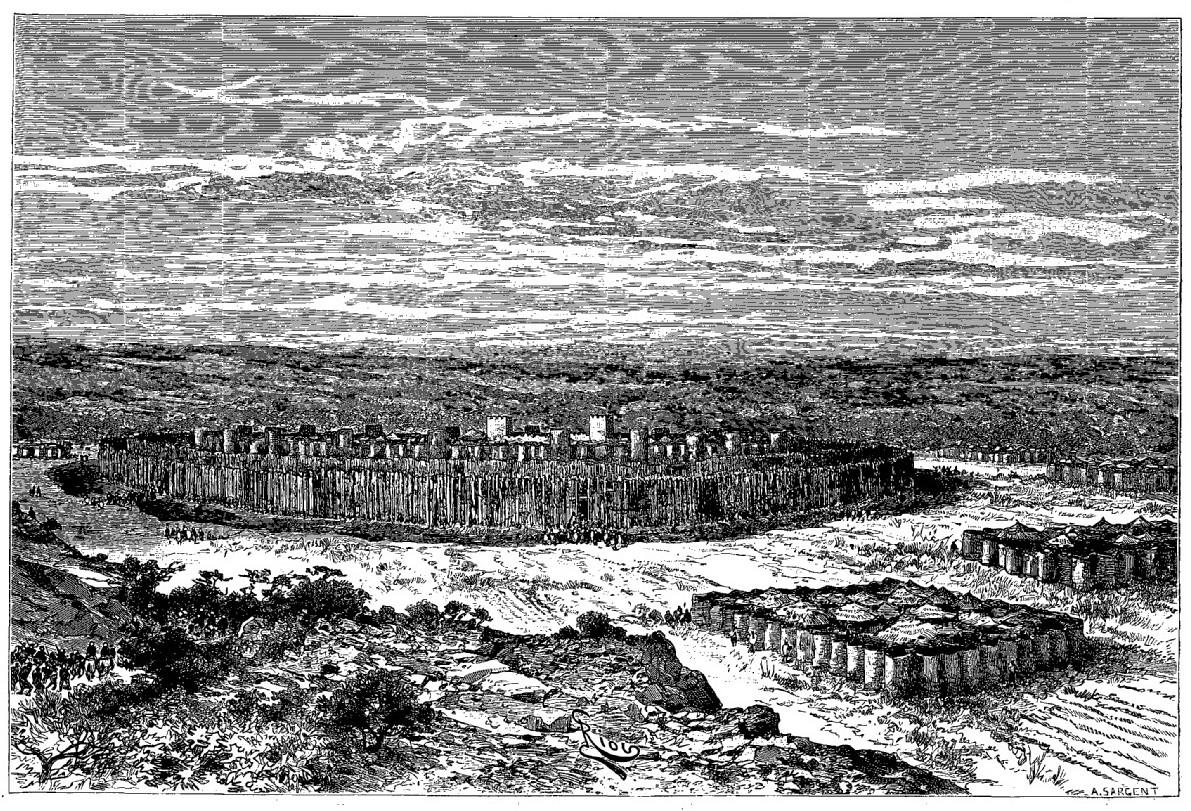
A view of the tata of Toubacouta before it fell to the French

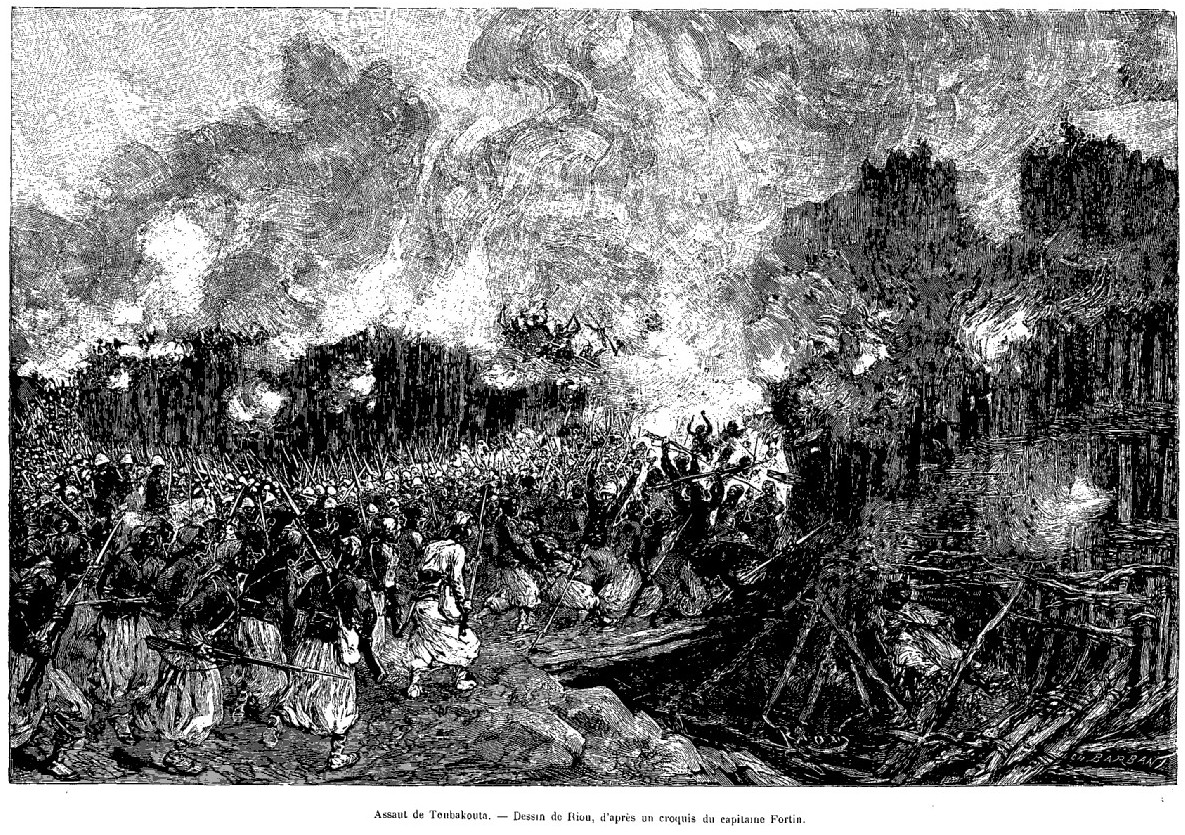
The final assault on Toubacouta, 1887

Meanwhile, Mahmadu Lamine re-established himself at Diana, in what is now the Tambacounda region. Quickly reorganizing his state, he re-invaded Bundu, killing Omar Penda on July 16, 1886. In December 1886, two French columns led by Lt. Col. Joseph Galliéni and battalion chief Vallière marched on the town. Although it was fortified by two tatas, Lamine and his troops abandoned it without a fight. On December 26 the French troops burned the town to the ground to punish the inhabitants.

Following this defeat, Lamine regrouped at Toubakouta on the border between Wuli and Sandougou, launching an attack against the former in July 1887. Galliéni seized Toubakouta on 8 December 1887. Lamine again escaped, but was tracked down and captured by the forces of Musa Molo, king of Fuladu, a key French ally. Wounded in the fight, he died on the way back to Toubakouta. His head was brought to the French, and his skull currently resides in the Musée de l’Homme.
