= Bankuba Forest Park =

- Interactive map of Bankuba Forest Park
- Location: Central River Division Gambia
- Nearest city: Bansang
- Coordinates: 13°24′N 14°34′W
- Area: 794.3 ha (1,963 acres)
- Established: January 1, 1954

Bankuba Forest Park is a forest park in the Gambia. Established on January 1, 1954, it covers 794.3 hectares.

It is located some 221 km east of Banjul, the state capital.
