= Fode Kaba Doumbouya =

Diakhanke marabout in the 19th century,

- Born: 1818; Goumbel, Boundou
- Died: March 23rd 1901; Medina, Senegal
- Occupation: Marabout
- Known for: Resistance to French colonialism

Fodé Kaba Doumbouya, also spelled Dumbuya, was a Diakhanke marabout in the 19th century, one of the leaders resisting French and British colonial expansion in Senegambia.

== Early life ==
Fode Kaba Doumbouya was born in 1818 in Goumbel in Boundou, in what is now eastern Senegal. His father, Fode Bakary, was a prominent marabout and Islamic scholar who was invited first to the court of Faranba Tamba of Kabendu and later to Kerewane, near Pata, under the aegis of the local Nyancho ruler Silati Kelefa. At some point, the young Fode Kaba served under Maba Diakhou Ba.

== Career ==
In the early 1870s, Fode Kaba rebelled against Silati Kelefa, killing him when he refused to convert to Islam, and also killing one of his key allies, a Fula marabout. The king of nearby Fuladu, Alfa Molo, set out to punish him. In 1873 he destroyed Kerewane and killed Fode Bakary, but Kaba was in Nioro du Rip looking for allies at the time. Upon his return he launched a war against the Muslim Fula and against local animists in general. In 1876 he launched a series of raids against Balanta villages near Sedhiou, until forced to withdraw by the French colonial forces stationed there. In 1877, Balde and his British allies pushed Fode Kaba west, where he massacred the people of the village of Bapikoum and rebuilt it as a large fortified tata called Medina. This would be his base for the rest of his life, from which he controlled Fogny and eastern Kiang.

In territory he controlled, Fode Kaba instituted a government based on Islamic principles, building mosques, posting talibes in conquered settlements, and banning the tapping of trees for palm wine. He frequently raided the Jola, leading to local depopulation, and would sell captives into Fuladu in exchange for horses and guns.

1890 the British wanted to rid themselves of Fode Kaba, whose raids were harming the agricultural productivity of the emerging Gambia Protectorate, but the French sheltered him. In 1891 he signed a protectorate agreement with the French, and in 1893 ceded his lands in Fogny to them.

== Downfall ==
In 1900, a dispute over some ricefields between two villages escalated. British attempts to mediate escalated to violence, and the chief involved fled to Fode Kaba, who refused to surrender him to the colonial authorities. In March 1901 a column led by Colonel Rouvel, commanding 366 Senegalese Tirailleurs, 44 Spahis, 3 cannons and 600 auxiliaries, marched on Medina. Ravel was supported by 400 cavalry under Alfa Molo's son Moussa Molo, as well as 800 men from the British West India Regiment (WIR) and the Central Africa Regiment (CAR). On the 23rd, French artillery breached the walls, and Doumbouya was killed in the ensuing assault.

== Legacy ==
Fode Kaba Doumbouya is remembered as a folk hero in much of Casamance today. The Senegalese operation to quash the 1981 coup attempt against President Dawda Jawara of The Gambia was named after him.

== See also ==
- Aline Sitoe Diatta

== Sources ==
=== Bibliography ===
- Nugent, Paul (2007). "CYCLICAL HISTORY IN THE GAMBIA/CASAMANCE BORDERLANDS: REFUGE, SETTLEMENT AND ISLAM FROM c. 1880 TO THE PRESENT". The Journal of African History. 48 (2): 221–243. doi:10.1017/S0021853707002769. hdl:20.500.11820/9d001cfe-8617-442f-ae6b-7551acde0d68.
- Roche, Christian (1971). "Portraits de chefs casamançais du XIXe siècle". Revue française d'histoire d'outre-mer. 58 (213): 451–467.

=== Further reading ===
- Christian Roche, « Les trois Fodé Kaba », in Notes africaines (Dakar), n128, October 1970, p. 107-111
- Christian Roche, « Les origines du diaxanké Fodé Kaba et ses premières campagnes (1818-1880) » (chap. 5) and « La lutte franco-britannique contre Fodé Kaba (1880-1901) » (chap. 6), in Histoire de la Casamance : Conquête et résistance 1850-1920, Karthala, 2000, p. 132-154 (Thèse Université de Paris I, remaniée) ISBN 2865371255
