= Mampatim =

- Town and commune
- Location in Senegal
- Coordinates: 12.892°N 14.331°W
- Country: Senegal
- Region: Kolda Region
- Department: Kolda
- Arrondissement: Mampatim

Area
  - Town and commune: 387.3 km^{2} (149.5 sq mi)

Population (2023 census)
  - Town and commune: 21,955
  - Density: 56.69/km^{2} (146.8/sq mi)
- Time zone: UTC+0 (GMT)

Mampatim is a town and commune located in the Kolda Region of Senegal.

Mampatim was the capital of a Bainuk kingdom whose ruler, Kikikor, was defeated by Tiramakhan Traore, founder of Kaabu. Traore may have died in Mampatim.
