= Kansala =

Former capital of Kaabu

- Location within Guinea-Bissau
- 12°32′11″N 014°11′41″W
- Cultures: Kaabu
- Satellite of: Mali Empire
- Location: Gabu Region
- Region: Guinea Bissau

History
- Built by: Mansa Sala Sane
- Abandoned: 1867

Kansala was the last capital of Kaabu, located in what is now Guinea Bissau. The town was destroyed in the 1867 Battle of Kansala.

== History ==
Kaabu was founded by Mandinka immigrants from the Mali Empire in the 13th century, and was initially its vassal. Mansa Sala Sane established Kansala to replace the old, less centrally located Bainuk capital of Mampatim. The city was also the site of the sacred grove where the mansaba of Kaabu was crowned. As the Mali empire waned, Sama Koli proclaimed independence in 1537 but maintained many of the trappings of Malian cultural heritage and established trade relations with the Portuguese on the coast.

The defenses of the city were legendary: a series of seven concentric tata, each representing one of the core territories of the empire. In the 1860s the Fula of Kaabu and its neighboring states, committed Muslims, launched the Kansala War to end animist Mandé dominance of the region. The city was besieged for eleven days, when the reigning Mansaba Janke Wali lost heart. As the Fula swarmed into Kansala, he ignited the gunpowder stores, killing all the Mandinka defenders and devastating the invading army.

== Archaeology ==
The site of Kansala was excavated for the first time by a multinational team in early 2024, focusing on the remains of the ruler's tata.
