= Geba, Guinea-Bissau =

Geba
- Location in Guinea-Bissau
- Coordinates: 12°09′26″N 14°45′37″W
- Country: Guinea-Bissau
- Admin. Region: Bafatá Region
- Established: c. 1520

Geba is a village in Guinea-Bissau, on the north bank of the eponymous Geba river.

== Etymology ==
The name 'Geba' originated from the Biafada term 'bejébi', meaning 'fresh water'.

== History ==
The Geba region was originally inhabited by the Biafada people, though they were progressively displaced by the Mandinka of the Kaabu federation. The town was established by Portuguese traders in the early 16th century, and it quickly became one of the most important ports in Portuguese Guinea, shipping thousands of slaves to the Americas every year. By the 1640s the town had become increasingly Africanized and, dominated by the Kaabu province of Ganadu, hard for Portuguese authorities to control. In 1644, they forced the town's merchants to move to Cacheu and Farim.

The decline of the slave trade and the Soninke-Marabout Wars of the 19th century dramatically curtailed trade in Geba. Efforts by the Portuguese colonial governors to sideline the powerful and independent merchants of the town also continued. The collapse of Kaabu and the rise of Fuladu further weakened Geba's commercial position. The town also became a center of creole resistance to the extension of Portuguese hegemony in the area.

By the early 1900s, the population of the town had dwindled to a few hundred. The presidio of Geba was transferred to nearby Bafatá in 1912. The catholic parish headquarters also moved in 1944, around the time Geba lost its last administrative status. Amilcar Cabral's father Juvenal taught at the Geba school.

== Culture ==
Some of the inhabitants of Geba are commonly known as 'Kriston', a term derived from Portuguese "cristão", meaning "Christian", and the town still boasts a Catholic church.
