= Alfa Molo =

First king of the Fuladu kingdom

Alfa Yaya Molo Balde
- Reign: 1867–1883
- Successor: Musa Molo
- Born: Souloubali
- Died: 1883; Dandou, Guinea-Bissau
- Consort: Coumba Oude
- Issue: Dikory Coumba, Moussa Molo, Sambel Coumba
- Molo Egue
- Religion: Islam

Alfa Yaya Molo Balde was the founder of Fuladu, a kingdom in the Casamance region of modern-day Senegal.

== Rise to Power ==
Molo Egue was born in Souloubali as a slave of a noble Fula named Samba Egue. The Toucouleur marabout El-Hajj Omar Tall supposedly visited him in 1847, inspiring him to launch a Fula rebellion against the Mandinka rulers of Kaabu that had dominated the region between the Gambia River and what is now Guinea-Bissau for centuries. He attacked a nearby Mandinka village with a few followers, but was repulsed. Over time, however, his band of raiders found increasing success, which attracted recruits and allowed Alfa Molo to build a tata in the village of Ndorna. Faced with a Kaabunke counterattack, he called for help from the Imamate of Futa Jallon.

Alfa Molo's alliance with Futa Jallon plunged Kaabu into an existential war, culminating in the 1867 Battle of Kansala. With his victory, he established the independent kingdom of Fuladu.

== Rule ==
In 1873 a conflict broke out with the marabout Fode Kaba. In 1878, allied with the British in The Gambia, Alfa Molo forced him westwards towards Fogny. In 1880, Alfa Molo's former master Samba Egue rebelled, refusing to be ruled by someone of the slave class, but was defeated and killed.

Alfa Molo died in 1883 of venereal disease and was succeeded by his son Musa Molo.
