= Koussanar =

Coordinates: 13°52′00″N 14°05′00″W

Koussanar is a town in central Senegal in Tambacounda Department, center of an arrondissement.

Koussanar was the center of a small pre-colonial state ruled by the Sane family, a sub-branch of the Kaabu ruling dynasty. From at least the 16th century they were historical rivals of the Wali dynasty of Wuli until colonization in the 20th century when they were forced to accept Wali suzerainty.

== Transport ==
Koussanar lies on the N1 highway linking Dakar to the Mali border at Kidira, and is served by a station on the Dakar-Niger Railway, which as of 2023 no longer operates.

== See also ==
- Railway stations in Senegal
