= Mussa Moloh =

Last king of the Fuladu kingdom

Moussa Molo Balde
- Reign: 1881–1903
- Predecessor: Alfa Molo
- Born: Kerewane, Senegal
- Died: 1931; Keserekunda, The Gambia
- Father: Alfa Molo
- Mother: Coumba Oude
- Religion: Islam

Mussa Moloh (mid to late 1800s-1931), also written as Musa or Moussa Molo was the last king of Fuladu in the Senegambia region. A ruthless and powerful ruler, he played different colonial powers off of each other for decades before being defeated by the French in 1903 and exiled to The Gambia. Musa Molo was the last precolonial leader to exert real territorial control in the region.

== Fuladu ==
Fuladu was founded by Musa Molo's father Alfa Molo in the aftermath of the 1867 Battle of Kansala. Alpha Molo had led a Fula rebellion against the Mandinka rulers of Kaabu that had dominated the region between the Gambia River and what is now Guinea-Bissau for centuries. Fuladu was diverse, containing the Fulbe as well as their former overlords the Mandinka and other ethnicities. There existed tensions between the different groups and the Firdu Fulbe, Alpha Molo's core base of support, who settled mostly in Tumana and Jimara, two of Kaabu's former constituent kingdoms in the Gambia river valley.

== Early life and leadership ==
Musa Molo Balde's family was descended from slaves and hailed originally from Bundu. Following Fuladu's founding, he had significant influence in his father's government. He became a great military leader as well as a political representative for Fuladu during meetings with the British.

Upon his father’s death in 1881, Mussa accepted the nominal rule of his uncle Bakary Demba, as was the custom of the time, but maintained both political and military control over a large area of what is now Senegalese region of Kolda. He came to power in his own right in 1893.

== Rule ==
While still serving as the power behind his uncle's throne, Musa brutally repressed rebellions in the south of Fuladu, killing his rivals and enslaving their families. He consolidated his rule by eliminating potential challengers within his family with support from the French He built a much more centralized governmental apparatus than his father, although weak transportation and communication networks hampered effective control. He twice invaded Kantora and dramatically expanded Fuladu's borders, becoming increasingly autocratic and imposing onerous taxes to support the wars.

Musa's harsh and arbitrary rule caused large-scale emigration by Fula and as well as minority ethnicities, often seeking the protection of European trading posts. Musa would then increase the tax burden on those who remained to compensate for the losses, pushing them to leave as well. He arrested those unable to pay taxes, enslaved people where he could, and cut off the limbs of those who angered him, particularly the Mandinka.

== Interactions with the Europeans ==
Colonial powers in the region were, from the earliest part of his reign, interested in economic access to Musa's kingdom. The British first contacted him in 1880, and the French 3 years later signed a treaty with him. These two powers, as well as the Portuguese, drew lines on maps nominally subdiving Fuladu into spheres of influence, but in practice Musa used them to bolster his own unquestioned power. By signing various treaties with the three powers, often with no intention of following the unenforceable provisions, Musa buttressed his own political and economic strength.

Increasingly, however, Musa's control of the entire area was due to assistance from the French, who considered him a powerful ally in their expansion into the Casamance. They supported him in campaigns north to the Gambia River, defeating and killing the Mandinka warlord Fode Kaba in 1901, and conquering Niani (at the expense of Mahmadu Lamine) and Kantora. But in return Musa conceded half of his tax revenue, some control over his actions, and the presence of a French resident in Hamdallaye, one of his capitals. As the 20th century dawned, colonial encroachment had diminished his independence in his own domains, particularly on the French side of the hardening borders. Musa's power was impossible to square with British and French plans, who had divided Fuladu into spheres of influence in 1900, with the British annexing their section into the Gambia Colony and Protectorate in 1902.

== Exile ==
In May 1903 the French attempted to bring Musa to heel; rather that submit, he led a group of around 3000 people (some of whom had been forced to come) to the British side of Fuladu.

Once in The Gambia, the British integrated Musa Molo into their system of indirect rule as a chief in Fulladu West with an annual stipend of 500 pounds sterling. After a local revolt in 1919, however, he was exiled again to Sierra Leone, but returned 4 years later. From the Gambia, Musa Balde could not control Fuladu by strength of arms, and so relied on marriage alliances with local notables, Fula and Mandinka alike. He spent nearly 30 years fighting and negotiating with the British, dying at Keserekunda in 1931. His son served as district chief from 1924 to 1952, and his grandson from 1964 to 1997.
