= Goundiourou =

Goundiourou Dougouba
- Village
- Location within Mali
- Coordinates: 14°24′N 11°26′W
- Country: Mali
- Region: Kayes
- Cercle: Kayes Cercle
- Elevation: 33 m (108 ft)
- Time zone: UTC+0 (GMT)

Goundiourou, sometimes spelled Gunjur, also known as Dougouba, is a village in Mali just south of the city of Kayes. It was historically an important center of trade and islamic thought, and may be the same town mentioned in the chronicle of Al Bakri under the name Ghiyaru.

== Toponymy ==
The name 'Goundiourou' comes from the Soninke term 'gunjeere' meaning a virgin forest.

== History ==
There have been multiple villages with the name Goundiourou, making historical reconstruction difficult. The first settlement presumably pre-dated the arrival of Islam in the region, and was mentioned by Al Bakri in his 11th century travelogue as a major center of trade in the orbit of the Ghana Empire. Specifically Ghiyaru, as he called it, was a densely populated area which was the source of the best gold, 12 miles from the Senegal River on the north bank. Other historians dispute this identification, placing Ghiyaru to the east on the Niger River. According to oral traditions, a second Goundiourou on the south bank was founded by Mamadu Khumba Drame in the 12th or 13th century.

While nominally a part of the Kingdom of Diarra, Goundiourou maintained a degree of legal independence as the center of a small theocracy under the rule of Qaids and Islamic judges. The king of Diarra would come to the city every year during Ramadan to pray and honor the scholars.

Goundiourou was sacked by the king of Kaarta in the early 1790s, after which it was abandoned for 20 years. A new Goundiourou, sometimes known as 'Dougouba', meaning 'big village', was eventually built on the ruins. Mahmadu Lamine Drame, a prominent marabout and resistance fighter against French colonialism, was born in Goundiourou. The French destroyed the town as punishment, although it was eventually rebuilt.
