= Tambacounda department =

Coordinates: 13°46′8″N 13°40′2″W

Tambacounda
- Department
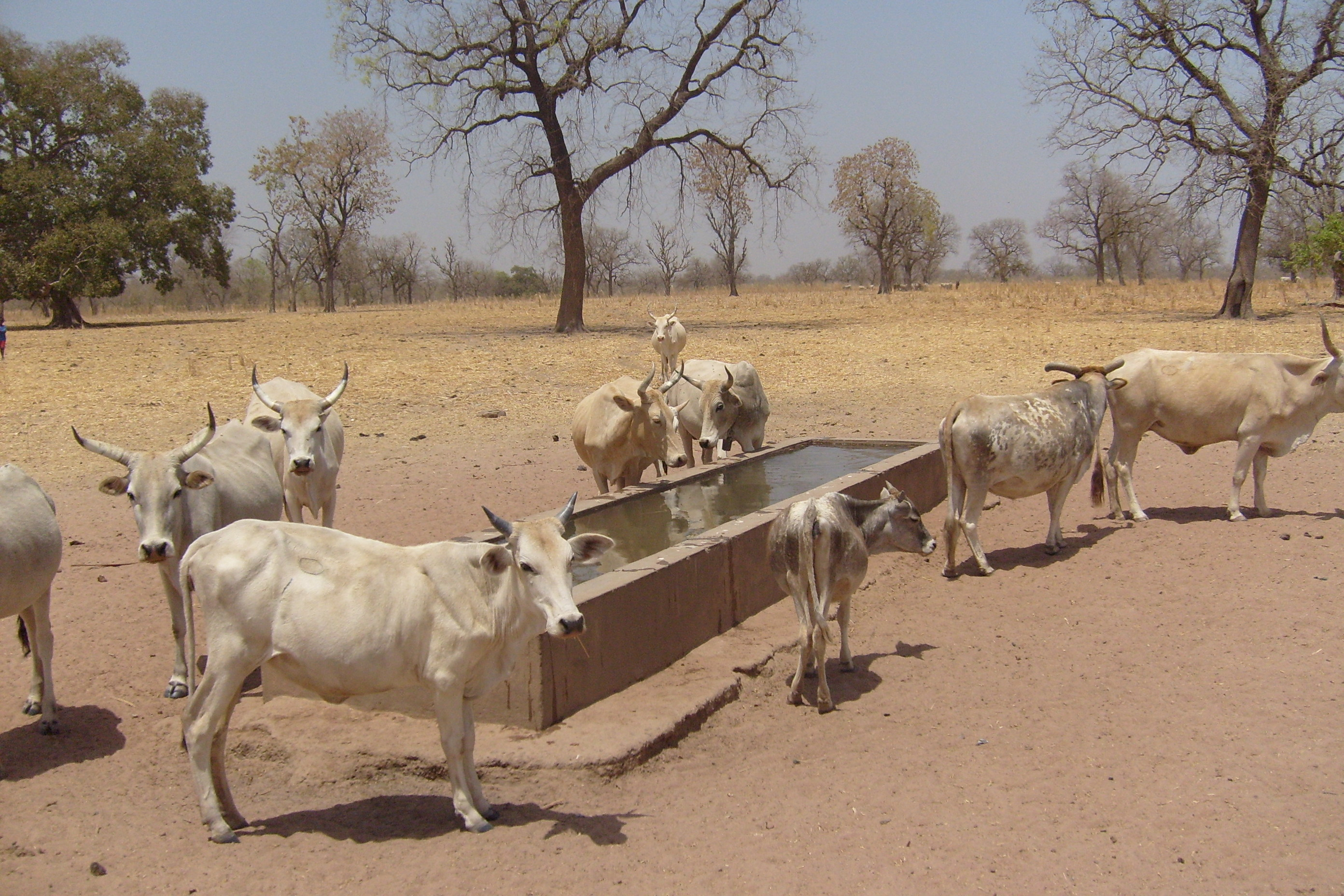

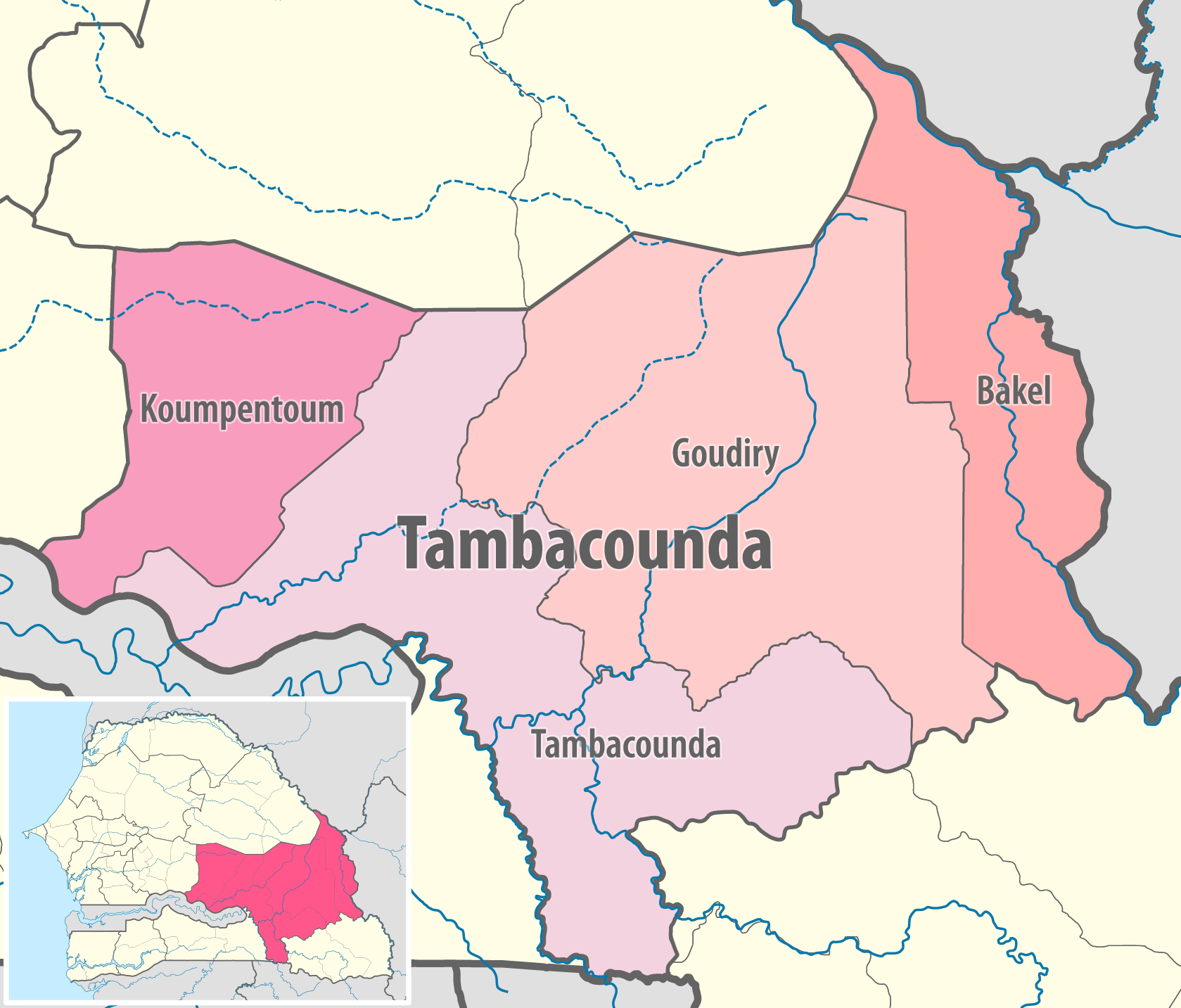
- Former location in the Tambacounda region
- Country: Senegal
- Region: Tambacounda region
- Capital: Tambacounda

Area
  - Total: 20,328 km^{2} (7,849 sq mi)

Population (2023 census)
  - Total: 427,419
  - Density: 21.026/km^{2} (54.457/sq mi)
- Time zone: UTC+0 (GMT)

Tambacounda department is one of the 46 departments of Senegal, and one of the four making up the Tambacounda region. It formerly covered an area of 20,328 km² and in 2013 had an estimated population of 283,769. However in 2005 it was reduced in size to create the new Koumpentoum department.

The department has one only urban commune, that of Tambacounda.

The rest of the department is divided into three arrondissements. In turn, they are divided into the following rural districts (communautés rurales):

- Koussanar Arrondissement:
  - Koussanar
  - Sinthiou Malème
- Makacolibantang Arrondissement:
  - Makacolibantang
  - Niani Toucouleur
  - Ndoga Babacar
- Missirah Arrondissement:
  - Dialacoto
  - Missirah
  - Néttéboulou

== Historic sites ==
- Railway Station and Railway Hotel in Tambacounda
- The building housing the Prefecture in Tambacounda
- Tata of Maba Diakhou Ba at Ndoungoussine
- Wells and historic remains at Ndoungoussine
- Megalithic site at Thiékène Boussoura
- Megalithic site at Kodiam
- Megalithic site at Saré Diouldé
- Megalithic site at Saré Sékourou
