= Nyancho =

Royal dynasty of the Kaabu Empire

- Country: Senegal; Guinea Bissau; The Gambia; Guinea
- Founded: 1240; 786 years ago (approx.)
- Founder: Tiramakhan Traore
- Final ruler: Janke Wali
- Estate: Kaabu
- Deposition: 1867

The Nyancho (also spelled Nyantio, Ñaanco, Nyanthio or Nyanco) were a royal maternal dynasty that ruled the West African empire of Kaabu.

== Origins ==
The Nyancho's legendary origins begin with a Mandinka woman named Balaba, or in some versions Tenemba. She fled the Manding region to Mampatim, at the time the center of a Bainuk kingdom, and took shelter in a cave. Pregnant at the time of her arrival, the local population took her for a djinn or sorceress as there was no man living with her. She gave birth to three daughters who were then married to the three sons of Tiramakhan Traore, who had led a powerful force to incorporate the area into the Mali Empire. The Nyancho were the maternal descendants of these three couples. They could therefore claim legitimacy through conquest, the Mandinka patrilineal inheritance system, and local Bainuk matrilineal traditions.

The term 'Nyancho' is derived from the Mandinka phrase I nyon ten, meaning 'you have no equal.

== Rule ==
Traore's three sons and their descendants ruled Kaabu's royal provinces (or constituent kingdoms) of Jimara, Pacana, and Sama, alternating the mansaya (overall kingship) between them.

The Nyancho ruling class, warrior-elites made rich war and slave raiding, were part of either the Manneh and Sanneh paternal lineages. Only those descended from Nyancho bloodlines on both sides could be elected mansa of Kaabu.

== See also ==
- Mali Empire
- Battle of Kansala
- Guelowar

== Bibliography ==
- Barry, Boubacar (1998). Senegambia and the Atlantic Slave Trade. Cambridge: Cambridge University Press. pp. 388 Pages. ISBN 0-521-59226-7.
