= Ndorna =

- Town and commune
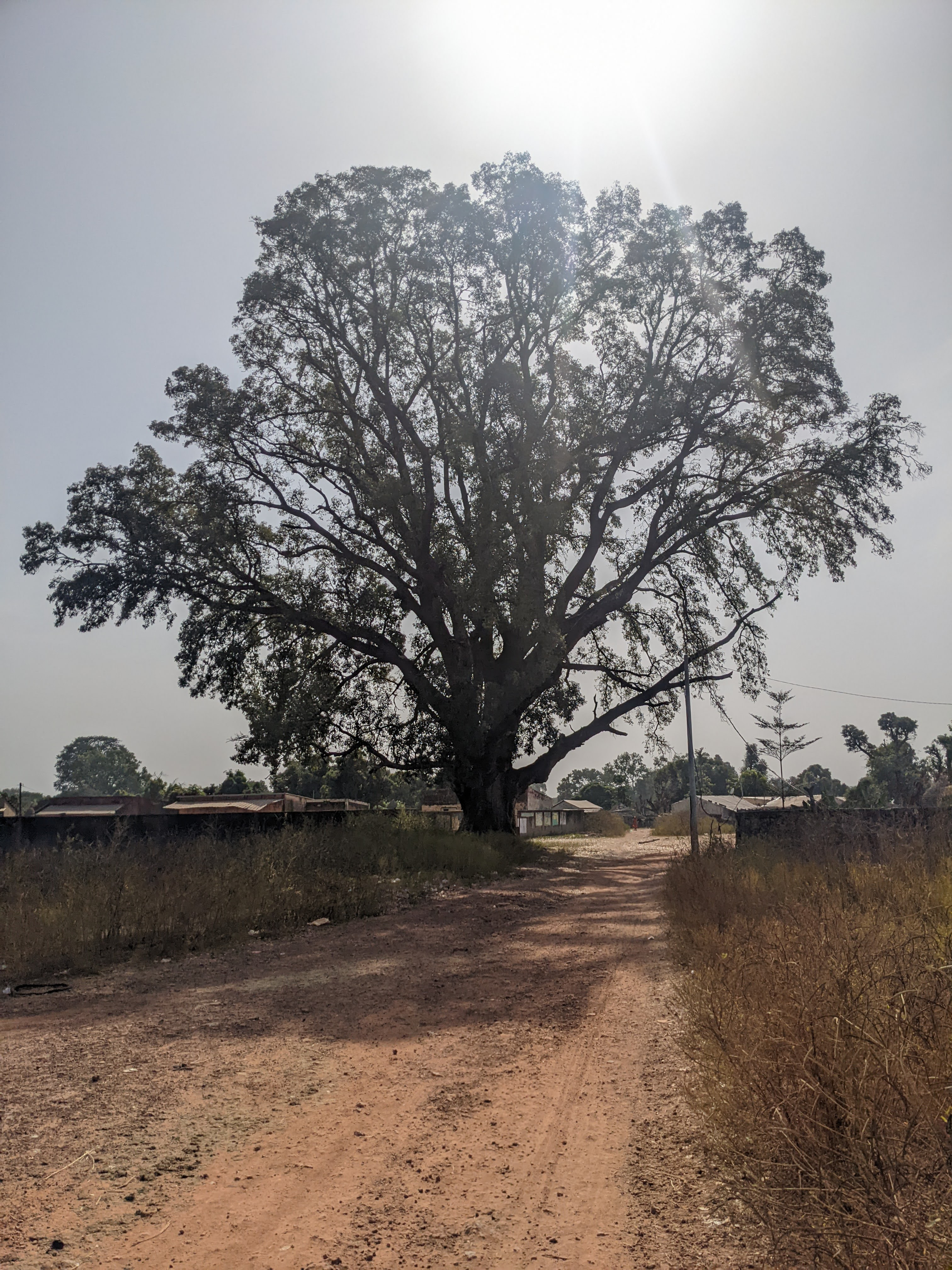
- Khaya senegalensis in Ndorna

- Location in Senegal
- Coordinates: 13.16°N 15.03°W
- Country: Senegal
- Region: Kolda Region
- Department: Medina Yoro Foula
- Arrondissement: Ndorna

Area
  - Town and commune: 77.44 km^{2} (29.90 sq mi)

Population (2023 census)
  - Town and commune: 39,955
  - Density: 515.9/km^{2} (1,336/sq mi)
- Time zone: UTC+0 (GMT)

Ndorna is a town and commune located in the Kolda Region of Senegal. From 1874 to 1903, it was the capital of Fuladu.
