= Battle of Kansala =

1867 siege in Guinea-Bissau

- Part of Soninke-Marabout Wars
Date	May 13, 1867 to May 24, 1867
Location	Kansala
Result	Victory of Futa Jallon: Destruction of Kaabu; Foundation of Fuladu

Belligerents
Kaabu Empire	Imamate of Futa Jallon

Commanders and leaders
Mansaba Janke Wali	Almamy Oumarou Jalloh Jamboria; Alfa Molo Balde

Strength
12,000	5,500

Casualties and losses
10,000 dead	1,000 dead

The Battle of Kansala or Turban Keloo (Mandinka for Annihilation War) was the siege of the capital of the Kaabu federation in 1867 by the Imamate of Futa Jallon, allied with rebellious Fula people from Kaabu itself. The battle, which saw the town completely destroyed, ended Mandinka hegemony over Africa’s Atlantic coast begun by the Mali Empire.

== Background ==
Kaabu was founded in the 13th century as a province of the Mali Empire and dominated southern Senegambia up until the 19th century. The area was ethnically diverse, though the Mandinka Nyancho lineages dominated the political system.

The power of Kaabu began to wane during the eighteenth and nineteenth centuries. In 1776, militant Islamic Torodbe clerics established a theocratic state in the Futa Djallon. With some support from Soninke and Mandinka chiefs, they launched a jihad against non-Muslim states in the region, particularly Kaabu. This holy war would culminate in the Battle of Kansala.

Some non-Muslim Fula, pushed out of the Futa Djallon by the Torodbe, settled in Kaabu and often herded the cattle of the ruling Nyancho aristocracy. Over the course of the conflict with the Imamate, however, these immigrants were seen as a potential 'fifth column', and were oppressed and extorted, creating civil conflict in the empire. The decline of the slave trade, a pillar of the economy for centuries, also pushed Mandinka elites to squeeze the peasants for taxes to replace their lost trade revenues, creating further unrest.

Oral histories record that before attacking Kansala the Fula leaders put several marabouts into retreat for forty days and nights. So great was the Kaabu Emperor's magical protection that only one of them was finally able to penetrate the shield, but it was enough. When this marabout emerged with the announcement that he had the Kaabu Emperor in his grasp, it was the signal for the waiting Futa Jallon army to march.

== Forces ==
There are conflicting reports on the sizes of the armies. According to historian Djibril Tamsir Niane, Kaabu had 25,000 soldiers, half of whom were mustered by mansaba Dianke Waali to meet the Fulani invasion at Kansala. The Fula mobilized perhaps 32,000 men, of whome 12,000 were cavalry, or 12,000 men total.

== Siege ==
Alfa Molo’s forces surrounded Kansala’s fortress for either one or three months, depending on the source. Though both sides were armed with muskets, neither would fire a shot. According to legend, Abdu Khudus, a prominent marabout from Timbo, told Alfa Molo that whichever side fired first would lose the battle. Within the Mandinka ranks, a resident marabout named Foday Barika Drammeh told Mansaba Waali the same. The Nyancho were infuriated by the mere presence of the Fula and believed that to not attack was cowardly. It is reported that on May 13, a Mandinka finally fired a shot that caused the battle to commence. The story is likely apocryphal and meant to highlight the hubris and arrogance of the Nyancho aristocrats.

== Battle ==
For eleven days, the Fula, who could not bring their cavalry to bear against the fortress walls, were kept at bay. The only cavalry casualty of the battle may have been a Mandinka named Faramba (General) Tamba of Kapentu whom marched out of Kansala with only his walking stick to drive the “haughty” Fula away. He was trampled to death by a Fula horseman. The Mandinka accounts are of the opinion that Fula took many casualties with hundreds of their infantry being decapitated as they tried to scale the wall with ladders. They failed to enter the city until Mansaba Waali, convinced that the sheer number of enemies was insurmountable, ordered the gates open. At this point, Mandinka women began committing suicide by jumping down wells to avoid slavery. Mansaba Waali ordered his sons to set fire to Kansala’s seven gunpowder stores once the city was full of the enemy. Six were successfully ignited, killing all the Mandinka defenders and devastating the invading army. Only around 4000 Fulas survived.

== Legacy ==
The fall of Kansala marked the end of the Kaabu Empire. In the aftermath Alfa Molo established the kingdom of Fuladu in the lands around the upper Gambia and Casamance rivers. From the campaign itself, Futa Jallon's army captured 15 000 slaves.

The story of the battle of Kansala remains one of the most well-known for griots in Senegambia today, particularly among the Mandinka. These stories often claim that "[no one] heard the sound of firing at Kansala". In addition, contemporary European sources do not mention the battle, and the remains of the site are relatively small. On this basis, historian George Brooks has argued that the size and importance of the Battle of Kansala has been dramatically exaggerated or fabricated in oral tradition, or conflated with another battle at Berekolong in 1851.

== See also ==
- Kaabu
- Imamate of Futa Jallon
- History of Guinea-Bissau

== Sources ==
- Bowman, Joye (1997). Ominous Transition: commerce and Colonial Expansion in the Senegambia and guinea, 1857-1919. London: Avebury. pp. 198 pages. ISBN 1-85972-154-0.
- Carpenter, N.R. (2012). Sovereignty along a west african frontier: The creation of the guinea- senegal border, 1850–1920 (History PhD). University of California, Davis. ProQuest 1234670452.
- Forrest, Joshua (2003). Lineages of State Fragility: rural Civil society in Guinea-Bissau. Athens, OH: Ohio University Press. pp. 312 pages. ISBN 0-8214-1490-9.
- Glovsky, David (2020). Belonging beyond boundaries : constructing a transnational community in a West African borderland (PhD). Michigan State University. doi:10.25335/4hjk-3y48.
- Lobban, Richard Andrew Jr.; Mendy, Peter Karibe (2013). Historical Dictionary of the Republic of Guinea-Bissau (4th ed.). Lanham: Scarecrow Press. ISBN 978-0-8108-5310-2.
- Sonko-Godwin, Patience (1988). Ethnic Groups of the Senegambia: A Brief History. Banjul, Gambia: Sunrise Publishers. pp. 65 pages. ISBN 9983-86-000-7.
- Vigh, Henrik (2006). Navigating Terrains of War: Youth and Soldiering in Guinea-Bissau. New York City: Berghahn Books. pp. 258 pages. ISBN 1-84545-149-X.
