= Kantora District =

Coordinates: 13°25′N 13°55′W

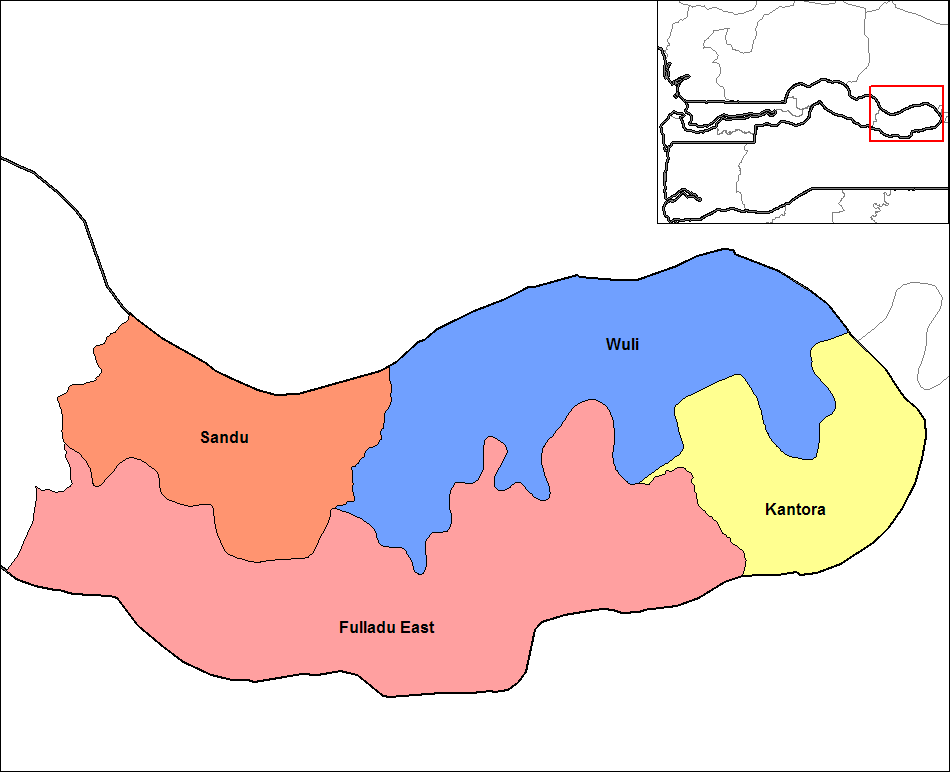
Districts of Upper River Division

Kantora District is one of the four districts of the Upper River Division of the Gambia. It is the easternmost district of the country.

The name derives from the Mandinka phrase "kana-ntoro," meaning "do not trouble me," referring to the disputes that Tiramakhan Traore's expedition struggled with there. They founded the village of Songkunda, meaning "place of agreement," to commemorate the re-establishment of peace.

The name of the area appears in written records as early as the 1456 voyage of Diego Gomes. At one point Kantora was a province of the Kabu Empire but it had different boundaries then. In particular, Duarte Pacheco Pereira noted in 1506 that Sutuco on the north bank of the river was the main trading center of Kantora. By the 1621 visit of Richard Jobson, however, the north bank was under the control of the King of Wuli.
