= Mampatim Arrondissement =

Coordinates: 12.8774°N 14.4776°W

Mapatim Arrondissement
- Arrondissement
- Interactive map of Mapatim Arrondissement
- Country: Senegal
- Region: Kolda Region
- Department: Kolda Department
- Time zone: UTC±00:00 (GMT)

Mampatim Arrondissement is an arrondissement of the Kolda Department in the Kolda Region of Senegal.

== Subdivisions ==
The arrondissement is divided administratively into rural communities and in turn into villages.
