= Patience Sonko-Godwin =

Gambian historian (born 1943)

Patience Sonko-Godwin (born 1943) is a Gambian historian.

Born in Banjul, Patience Sonko-Godwin was educated in the Gambia before going to St. Edwards Senior Secondary School in Freetown, Sierra Leone to have her sixth form education. She studied history at Fourah Bay College in Sierra Leone, and gained a masters at the University of California, Santa Barbara. Sonko-Godwin worked as a teacher at Nusrat High School until 1989, when she was appointed Principal Cultural Officer at the National Council for Arts and Culture. Executive Director of the Council from 1991 to 1998, she retired in 1998 to concentrate on her research and writing.

== Works ==
- Ethnic groups of the Senegambia: a brief history, 1985
- Ethnic groups of the Senegambia Region: social and political structures: precolonial period, 1986
- Trade in the Senegambia region : precolonial period, 1988
- Leaders of the Senegambia region: reactions to European infiltration, 19th-20th centuries, 1995
- Social and political structures in the precolonial periods: ethnic groups of the Senegambia Region, 1997
- Trade in the Senegambia region: from the 12th to the early 20th century, 2004
- Development of local industries in the Senegambia region: from pre-colonial to the colonial period, 2004
