= Tiramakhan Traore =

13th-century general in the Mali Empire

Tiramakhan Traore (variations : Toure-Makhan Traoré or Tirimakhan Trawally) was a 13th-century general in the Mali Empire who served under Sundiata Keita. In oral histories, Traore is credited with expanding the power of Mali into two very different areas: into Senegambia where he founded Kaabu, and into the region between Segou and Djenne.

A number of royal families traced their descent to Tiramakhan Traore, including the Guelowar of Sine and Saloum, the Nyancho aristocracy of Kaabu, and the Traore kings of the Kala and Bendugu provinces in what is central Mali.

== Early life ==
Traore originated from the village of Balansan, southwest of Kangaba. He is said to have been the son of a mighty hunter, Daamansa Wulading, who defeated a cannibal witch. This may be a legendary reflection of the way in which the extension of Mali sovereignty in the region overcame disorder caused by endemic raiding and a changing climate. He was an important commander at the Battle of Kirina, which took place within his lands.

== Conquest of Senegambia ==
Oral histories hold that around 1235 CE Sundiata Keita sent an expedition to the Jolof Empire to buy horses, but all their members were killed except one who was sent back to Mali with an insulting message. Traore had already been planning to move west into the sparsely inhabited but fertile lands ruled by the Bainuk people, so Sundiata sent him to avenge this insult. He led a group of 75,000 people, including 40,000 free men and woman as well as 35,000 slaves and numerous artisans, west from the traditional Manding lands. Sundiata also sent his son Mansa Wali with Traore to learn from him and as a sign of trust. The column moved slowly, taking a year to reach Wuli in what is now the eastern end of The Gambia, growing crops along the way.

Traore defeated and killed the Jolof buurba in a battle on the north bank of the Gambia River. He crossed the river at what is now Basse Santa Su, establishing the village of Kabakama there. He then fought the Bainuk in what is today the region of Sedhiou in Senegal.

A few years later, Traore marched on Mampatim and defeated Kikikor, the king of the Bainuk. He founded many new Mandinka towns, and ultimately died in Mampatim or perhaps Basse and was buried in Basse. A tree survived into the 19th century that supposedly marked Tiramakhan Traore's tomb.

== Kala and Bendougou ==
The Traore kings of Kala and Bendougou claim that Tiramakhan Traore, their ancestor, came down the river as part of the early expansion of the Mali Empire and settled in the village of Tla, later moving to Kamiamba, where he died. His descendants ruled minor kingdoms including Sibila, Kokry, Farakou Massa, N'Goa, and perhaps Dia, among others.
