= Fulladu West =

District of the Gambia

Coordinates: 13°30′N 14°45′W

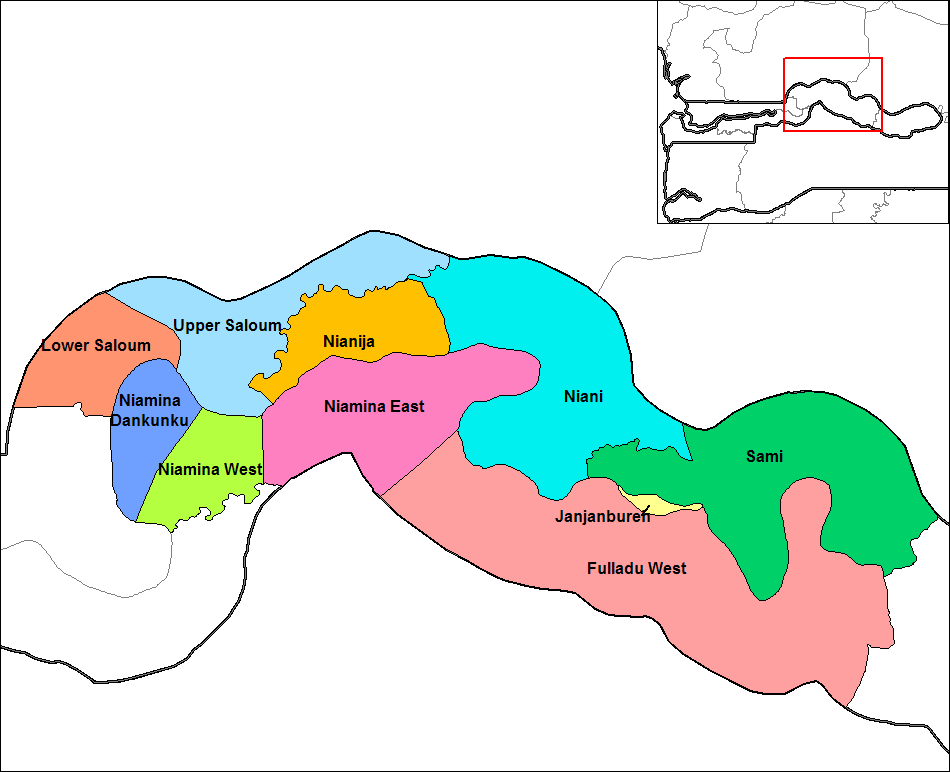
Districts of Central River Division

Fulladu West is one of the ten districts of the Central River Division of the Gambia.
