= Fuladu =

Historic region and kingdom in the Upper Casamance, in Senegal

Fulaadu
- 1867–1903
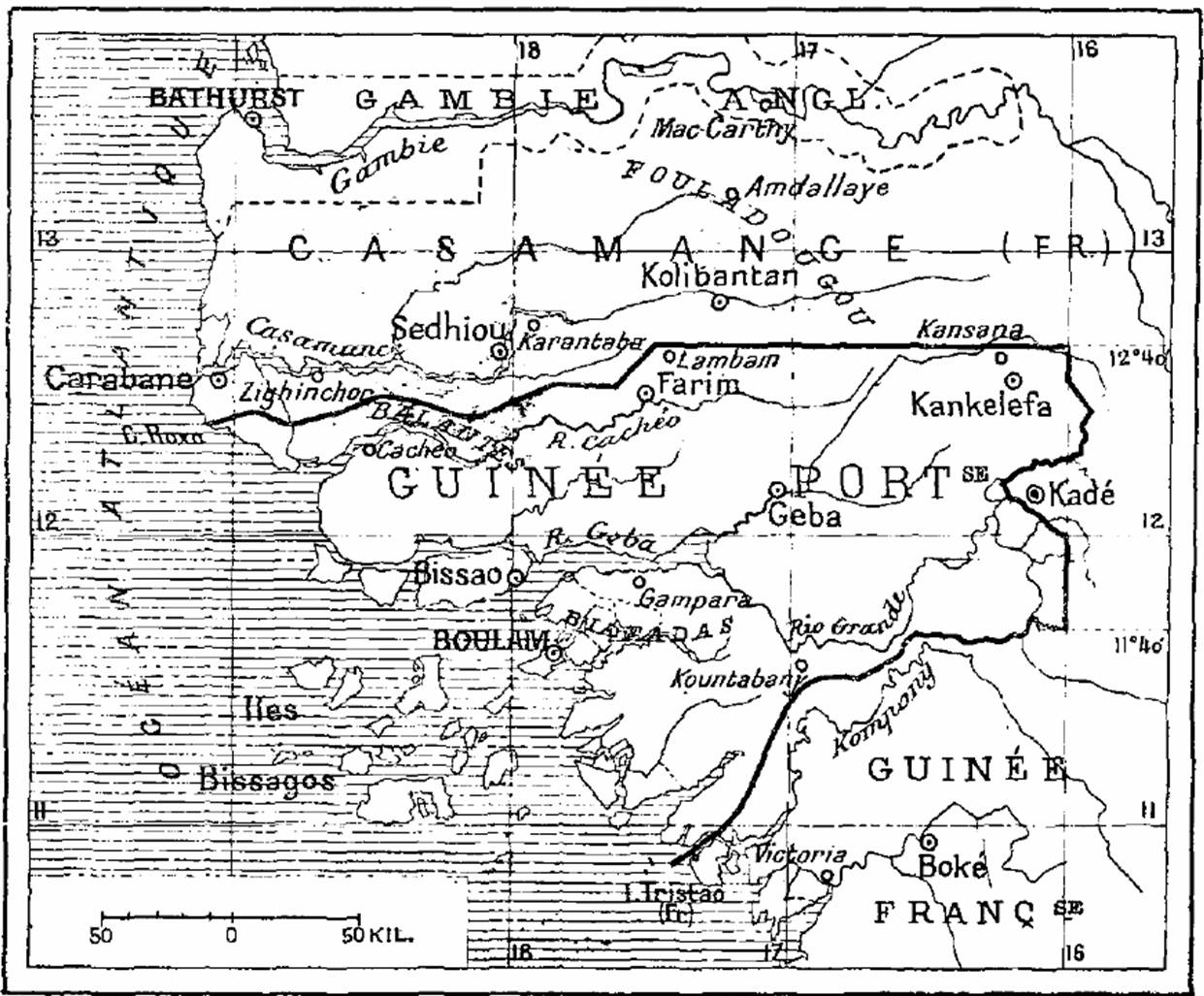
- "Fouladougou" (upper centre) on a 1906 map
- Capital: Ndorna, Hamdallaye
- Common languages: Fula
- Religion: Islam
- Government: Monarchy
  - 1865-1881: Alpha Molo Balde
  - 1881-1903: Moussa Molo Balde
- Historical era: Early Modern Period
  - Established: 1867
  - Disestablished: 1903
Preceded by
Kaabu
Succeeded by
Senegal
The Gambia
Portuguese Guinea

Fuladu (Fula: Fulaadu; French: Fouladou) or Fuladugu (French: Fouladougou) is a historic region and former Fula kingdom in the Upper Casamance, in the south of Senegal, and including certain areas in The Gambia and Guinea-Bissau. It was the last independent pre-colonial state in the area, ceasing to exist in 1903.

== History ==
=== Background ===
Before Fuladu's founding, the Mandinka controlled the region. They had established the kingdom of Kaabu as a vassal of the Mali Empire in the fifteenth century.

Nomadic pastoralists, the Fula peoples arrived in the region in a significant way in the fourteenth century, attracted by the pastureland. Other Fula people had migrated through the region before the arrival of the second wave of Fulbe, but they did not remain long; it was this second wave that lead to a permanent presence in the region. Initially, the Fula and the dominant Mandinka people had a good relationship. The Fula settled near the Mandinka in order to sell them dairy products produced by their cattle, in exchange for the agricultural products of the Mandinka. The Mandinka entrusted their own herds to the Fula, who circulated freely in Kaabu. Intermarriage between the two communities took place.

Later, however, the relationship between the Fula and the Mandinka deteriorated. The once mutually beneficial relationship (in which the Mandinka provided pasturage and protection in exchange for taxes, services, and gifts from the Fula) became more exploitative. Numerous Fula families were required to settle in the "fulakunda" established for them and to adopt agriculture in order to supply the Mandinka with tax revenue. The Fula were victims of harassment and humiliation and had to assimilate to the culture and language of the Mandinka. Many Fula fought to safeguard their language, traditions, and nomadic way of life. They revolted several times, but were defeated each time. The Mandinka justified the exactions that they practiced against the Fula as responses to these revolts.

=== Alpha Molo Balde's Revolt ===
In the mid-19th century chief Alpha Molo of Firdu led another revolt against the Kaabu Mansa. He unified the Fula of Kaabu and sought the help of the Fula Imamate of Futa Jallon. Leading an army of 35 000 men, Alpha Molo captured the Mandinka capital in the 11-day Battle of Kansala in 1867. This marked the creation of Fuladu, stretching from the upper Casamance River to northeastern Guinea-Bissau. In modern oral tradition, he is referred to as "Alpha the Liberator".

Before Alpha Molo, the Fula had followed the traditional religion, although there were some Fula marabouts. They converted to Islam in large numbers in order to win the support of Fouta Djalon for the revolt, since the Almami of Fouta Djallon were opposed to traditional religion, whether Fula, Mandinka, or other. In the course of the nineteenth century, numerous Fula Muslim states were established in this way: Bundu, Futa Toro, the Sokoto Caliphate, the Massina Empire (Diina), the Adamawa Emirate, and the Toucouleur Empire of El Hadj Umar Tall.

=== State building ===
Although he had overthrown Mandinka supremacy in Fuladu, Alpha Molo Balde based the structure of the new state on the decentralized Kaabu model. Many of the provinces of Fuladu were in fact the constituent kingdoms of Kaabu reorganized with Fulbe leaders. This transition was smoother in Alpha Molo's home region of Firdu (in modern day Senegal) than in the southern area known as Forria (now in Guinea-Bissau). Alpha consolidated control over several provinces that had once been part of Kaabu before Kansala. He promoted the Pulaar language and settled Fulas in formerly Mandinka communities. He also consolidated the forty-eight small territories into five major provinces, still with a decentralized power structure, each ruled by a loyal chief and Firdu under his direct administration. In 1874 he established his capital in Ndorna, north of Kolda.

Alpha Molo Balde died in 1881 at Dandu (now in Guinea-Bissau). He was succeeded first by his brother Bakari Demba and later by his son Musa Molo Balde.

=== Musa Molo and colonization ===
In order to win the succession dispute, Musa leaned on support from the French, though he would not prove to be a good puppet. They supported him in campaigns north to the Gambia River, defeating and killing the Mandinka warlord Fode Kaba in 1901, and conquering Niani (at the expense of Mahmadu Lamine) and Kantora. But in return Musa conceded half of his tax revenue, some control over his actions, and the presence of a French resident in Hamdallaye, one of his capitals. As the 20th century dawned, colonial encroachment had diminished his independence in his own domains, particularly on the French side of the hardening borders. Musa's power was impossible to square with British and French plans, who had divided Fuladu into spheres of influence in 1900, with the British annexing their section into the Gambia Colony and Protectorate in 1902.

In May 1903 the French attempted to bring Musa to heel; rather that submit, he led a group of around 3000 people (some of whom had been forced to come) to the British side of Fuladu. At this point Fuladu ceased to exist as an independent power, although Musa Molo continued to try to exert control by relying on marriage alliances with local notables, Fula and Mandinka alike.

Two present-day Districts of The Gambia are named Fulladu West and Fulladu East.

== Population ==
As its name suggests, the Fula form a majority of the population of Fuladu (about 55%). Most of the Fula in Fuladu are engaged in agriculture. They belong to the Fulbe Firdu group.

Minority ethnicities in Fuladu included the Mande Mandinka, Yalunka and Jakhanke people groups, as well as Wolofs, Jola, Bainuk, Balanta, and Manjacks.

Alpha and Musa Molo both promoted the Pulaar language and Fulbe culture, but were unable to impose it entirely. Culture and ethnicity were flexible and mixed in multi-ethnic Fuladu. Musa even appointed Mandinka chiefs as well as Fulbe. Still, the Mandinka population of the territory dropped precipitously as Alpha and Musa promoted Fula interests and sometimes hunted the Mandinka from territories they had formerly ruled. Upon Musa's exile, many people who had fled his harsh rule returned.

== Economy ==
Cotton is cultivated and animal husbandry is practiced. Agriculture is very profitable in the region compared to other parts of Senegal, because it is one of the best watered parts of the country. The vegetation is very rich and a wide range of fruits and legumes are cultivated, as well as rice.

== Bibliography ==
- Moustapha Barry, L'implantation des Peuls du Fouta Djalon dans le Fouladou (1867-1958), Université Cheikh Anta Diop de Dakar, 2000 (Master's thesis)
- Bellagamba, Alice. “A Matter of Trust. Political Identities and Interpersonal Relationships along the River Gambia.” Paideuma, vol. 46, 2000, pp. 37–61. JSTOR, http://www.jstor.org/stable/40341782. Accessed 4 June 2023.
- Gloria Lex, Le dialecte peul du Fouladou (Casamance-Sénégal) : étude phonétique et phonologique, Munich, LINCOM Europa, 2001, 554 p. ISBN 3895861758
- Glovsky, David (2020). Belonging beyond boundaries : constructing a transnational community in a West African borderland (PhD). Michigan State University. doi:10.25335/4hjk-3y48.
- Lobban, Richard Andrew Jr.; Mendy, Peter Karibe (2013). Historical Dictionary of the Republic of Guinea-Bissau (4th ed.). Lanham: Scarecrow Press. ISBN 978-0-8108-5310-2.
- Abdarahmane N’Gaïdé, Le royaume peul du Fuladu de 1867 à 1936 (l’esclave, le colon et le marabout), Université de Dakar, 1998, 280 p. (Thesis)
- Cl. Niang, Structures sociales et pouvoir politique traditionnel en milieu peul du Fouladou, Université de Dakar, Faculté des lettres et sciences humaines, 1982
- Mouhamadou Mustapha Sow, Colonisation et domination économique en Casamance : l'exemple de la fiscalité au Fouladou, 1895-1920, Université Cheikh Anta Diop, 2000, 127 p. (Master's thesis)
