= Kaabu =

State in the Senegambia region of West Africa (1537–1867)

Kaabu Empire Kaabu
- 1537–1867
- Kaabu around the 18th century. Associated states in lighter shade.
- Capital: Kansala
- Common languages: Mandinka
- Religion: Traditional African Religion
- Government: Monarchy
- Kaabu Mansaba
  - 13th century: Sama Koli (first)
  - 1867: Janke Waali (last)
- History
  - Kaabu Tinkuru Founded: 1230s
  - Independence from the Mali Empire: 1537
  - Battle of Kansala: 1867
- Currency: iron bars, cloth
Preceded by
Mali Empire
Succeeded by
Imamate of Futa Jallon
Fuladu
Portuguese Guinea

Kaabu (1537–1867), also written Gabu, Ngabou, and N'Gabu, was a federation of Mandinka kingdoms in the Senegambia region centered within modern northeastern Guinea-Bissau, large parts of today's Gambia, and extending into Koussanar, Koumpentoum, and the Casamance in Senegal.

It rose to prominence as an imperial military province of the Mali Empire. After the decline of the Mali Empire, Kaabu became independent. Kansala, the imperial capital, was captured by Fula forces from the Futa Jallon during the 19th century Fula jihads. However, Kaabu's successor states across Senegambia continued to thrive even after the fall of Kansala; this lasted until total incorporation of the remaining kingdoms into the British, Portuguese and French spheres of influence during the Scramble for Africa.

== Etymology ==
Scholars and oral historians have proposed various etymologies for the name Kaabu. These include it being derived from Kaba or Kangaba, Mali, the capital of the Mali Empire; from the Mandinka phrase kaa bung folo, meaning 'let's keep fighting'; or from Kambutchi, meaning 'the circumcised people' in the Bainuk language, the name of the pre-existing Bainuk kingdom.

== History ==
=== Pre-Imperial Roots and the Soce (Sose) ===
The presence of Mande-speaking populations in the Senegambia predates the Mali Empire by several centuries. These groups, referred to in Serer oral traditions as the Soos (or Sose), are believed to have migrated southward from the Western Sahara and the Tagant Plateau in present-day Mauritania. This movement was driven by the progressive aridification of the Sahara during the first millennium CE, which forced agriculturalist and pastoralist "Proto-Mande" populations to seek the more fertile lands of the senegambian coast Gambia River and Casamance basins.

At this time, these populations did not use the ethnonym Mandinka, a term that later became popularized to denote those hailing from the Manden heartland of Mali. Instead, they formed a localized, decentralized ruling class that interacted with indigenous forest-dwelling people.. These "Old Mande" or Soos communities established the linguistic and social foundations of the region, including the kingdom of kassa, long before the 13th-century unification under Tiramakhan Traore.

=== Pre-Imperial Foundations: The Jenung Dynasty ===
The region that would become Kaabu, stretching from the banks of the Gambia River to the Futa Djallon and the coast of present-day Guinea-Bissau, was characterized by a long-standing Mande-Bainuk presence. A significant political entity existed as early as the 7th century CE, known as the kingdom of Kambutchi. The earliest ruling dynasty was the Jenung (or Janung), a name of Mandinka origin, indicating that Mande linguistic and political influence predated the Mali Empire's expansion by several centuries.

While some sources suggest early Mande groups were solely immigrants, others emphasize a "gradualist" integration where Mande traders and indigenous forest-dwelling groups synthesized to form a mixed ruling class. This synthesis is personified in the figure of Gana Sira Bana, the last pre-imperial sovereign, whose reign represented the culmination of this Mande-Bainuk political structure before it was reorganized into the Kaabu Empire.

=== Ethnic Synthesis and the Bainuk Background ===
Historical and oral accounts characterize the pre-imperial population of the Casamance and Kaabu regions as a synthesis between early Mande migrants that moved in pre the Mali empire expansion and assimilated the indigenous forest-dwelling populations. These original inhabitants, often described in oral tradition as decentralized, agrarian communities, these integration formed the Bainuk political structure.

The resulting Bainunka culture represented a transitional social complex between the stateless societies of the forest and the centralized Mande political systems. The transition to the Kaabu Empire under the Nyancho elite was not a replacement of these people, but a political reorganization of an already stratified society consisting of these "older" Mande-Bainuk lineages. Bainuk legends describe a cruel king named Gana Sira Bana or Masopti Biaye, whose tyranny caused a general rebellion, and the kingdom split apart. These decentralized societies were ultimately unable to resist Mande expansion.

=== Mandinkanization and Elite Integration ===
The transformation of the Kaabu region into a Mandinka-dominated society was a process of Mandinkanization (cultural and linguistic assimilation) rather than a demographic replacement of the original population. While the expansion of the Mali Empire in the 13th century introduced a new warrior elite (the Nyancho), historical and biological evidence suggests that these migrants were absorbed into the pre-existing population.

The indigenous inhabitants primarily the Soose (the older Mande-speaking population) and the Bainuk adopted the mandinka political and social structures due to the political prestige and economic advantages of the Mali imperial system. This elite migration led to a change in the collective identity of the inhabitants of Kaabu, while the biological and ancestral makeup remained largely unchanged. Most "Mandinka" in the Kaabu region are thus the direct descendants of the older Senegambian populations who were assimilated into the Manding cultural sphere through centuries of intermarriage and social integration.

Mansa Sala Sane founded the city of Kansala to replace the old capital of Mampatim. It was more centrally located, and the location of the sacred wood where the new mansaba was crowned.

=== Independence ===
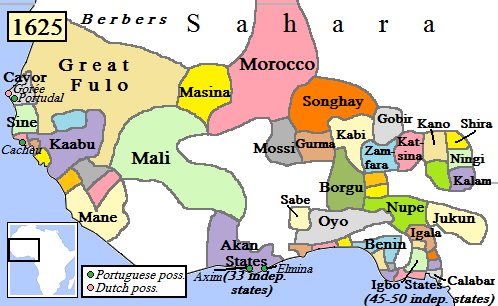
Kaabu Empire circa 1625 (in purple)

After the middle of the 14th century, Mali saw a steep decline due to raids by the Mossi to their south, the growth of the new Songhai Empire in the north, and succession disputes. Even its historically secure possessions in what is now Senegal, the Gambia, and Guinea-Bissau were cut off by the expanding power of Koli Tenguella in the early 16th century.

As Mali's authority collapsed, the Mandinka states of the region formed a federation. The number of provinces grew from three to seven, and these encompassed dozens of royal trading towns. These included among others, Firdu, Pata, Kamako, Jimara, Patim Kibo, Patim Kanjaye, Kantora, Sedhiou, Pakane Mambura, Kiang, Kudura, Nampaio, Koumpentoum, Koussanar, Barra, Niumi, Pacana etc. The kingdoms of Sine and Saloum were established in the 14th and 15th centuries respectively, ruled by Serer kings and Mandinka queens (the Guelowar dynasty).

Kaabu's many wars of expansion produced up to half of the African people sold into slavery during the 17th and 18th centuries.

According to Mandinka tradition, Kaabu remained unconquered for eight hundred and seven years. There were 47 mansas in succession.

=== Decline ===
The power of Kaabu began to wane during the 18th and 19th centuries. In 1776, militant Islamic Torodbe clerics established a theocratic state in the Futa Djallon. With some support from Soninke and Mandinka chiefs, they launched a jihad against non-Muslim states in the region, particularly Kaabu. Some non-Muslim Fula, pushed out of the Futa Djallon by the Torodbe, settled in Kaabu and often herded the cattle of the ruling Nyancho aristocracy. Over the course of the conflict with the Imamate, however, these immigrants were seen as a potential 'fifth column', and were oppressed and extorted, creating civil conflict in the empire. The decline of the slave trade, a pillar of the economy for centuries, also pushed Mandinka elites to squeeze the peasants for taxes to replace their lost trade revenues. Therefore, the war against the nyancho elites of Kaabu had ethnic, religious, and class components.

Up until the 1860s Kaabu had successfully repulsed on numerous occasions various Fula armies at the fort of Berekolong. In 1867, however, the Kaabu capital at Kansala came under siege from an army led by Alfa Omar of Labé and Alfa Molo Balde. At the climax of the eleven-day Battle of Kansala, Mansaba Janke Waali Sanneh (also called Mansaba Dianke Walli) ordered the city's gunpowder stores to be set afire. The resulting explosion killed the Mandinka defenders and 75% of the attackers. With Kansala obliterated, Mandinka hegemony in the region came to an end. The attackers could pursue their aim of conquering the entire Kaabu empire due to shortage of manpower after the battle of Kansala. As such the area called Fuladu, present day Kolda and part of Tambacounda in southern Senegal gained its independence and Alpha Molo Balde become the first king. Kansala was under Fula control until the Portuguese suppression of the kingdom around the turn of the 20th century..

However, the remains of some of Kaabu's constituent kingdoms continued to thrive, each installing their former mansa-rings answerable to the Mansaba in Kansala (Kaabu's capital city) to full-time Mansa. Among these were Nyambai, Kantora, Berekolong, Kiang, Faraba, Niani, Badibu, Wuli, Jarra and Berefet, mainly in Gambia and parts of southern Senegal. Other Nyancho-controlled areas were Sayjo (Sedhiou), Kampentum (Koumpentoum), Kossamar (Koussanar) and others in today's Senegal, until the arrival of the British and French colonialists at the turn of 20th century. To date, the influence of the Korings and Nyanchos are embedded within the sociocultural fabrics of post-independence Senegal, Gambia and Guinea Bissau.

== Government ==
Scholars disagree on whether Kaabu was a kingdom, an empire, a federation, or some mix of these. Although there was an emperor, known as the mansaba, power was decentralized and people generally were more responsive to local leaders than the distant, almost mythical, mansaba. The component kingdoms of the empire expanded, contracted, merged, split, appeared and disappeared over time.

=== The Nyancho ===
The Mansa of Kaabu was selected from among the leaders of the provinces of Jimara, Sama, and Pachana. In contrast to prevailing patrilineal traditions among the Mande, royal inheritance passed through the mother's line, respecting pre-conquest Bainuk inheritance customs. Three other provinces - Kantora, Tumana and Mana - were direct vassals of the three core areas.

The ruling class was composed of warrior-elites made rich by slaves captured in war. These ruling nobles were from two distinctive sets of clans Koring and Nyancho (or Nyantio). The Korings were from the Sanyang and Sonko clans, whilst the Nyanchos were Manneh and Sanneh. The Korings ruled the non-royal provinces, while only those descended from Nyancho bloodlines on both sides could be elected mansa. They claimed patrilineal descent from Tiramakhan Traore, founder of Kaabu, and matrilineal descent from a powerful pre-Mandinka indigenous sorceress. Thus the Nyancho claimed legitimacy through conquest, traditional Mandinka patrilineal inheritance, and local matrilineal traditions.

The principal tax, collected in cloth or pagnes, was known as the kabunko. Slaves worked large-scale cotton plantations to produce this form of currency. The nyancho warrior aristocracy used increasing tax revenue to fund more wars, thereby capturing more slaves, who produced more cloth, which financed still more wars.

== Culture ==
=== Language ===
Kaabu was a multicultural state hosting several languages, namely: Balanta, Jola-Fonyi, Mandinka, Mandjak, Mankanya, Noon (Serer-Noon), Pulaar, Serer, Sarakhule, and Wolof. Mandinka, however, was the language of the ruling class and of trade.

=== Music ===
Mandinka oral tradition holds that Kaabu was the actual birthplace of the Mande musical instrument, known as the kora. A kora is built from a large calabash cut in half and covered with cow skin to make a resonator, and has a notched bridge like a lute or guitar. The sound of a kora resembles that of a harp, yet with its gourd resonator it has been classified by ethnomusicologists such as Roderick Knight as a harp-lute. The kora was traditionally used by the griots as a tool for preserving history, ancient tradition, to memorize the genealogies of patron families and sing their praises, to act as conflict intermediaries between families, and to entertain. Its origins can be traced to the time of the Mali empire and linked with Jali Mady Fouling Diabate, son of Bamba Diabate. According to the griots, Mady visited a local lake in which he was informed that a genie who granted wishes had resided. Upon meeting him, Mady requested that the genie make him a brand new instrument that no griot had ever owned. The genie accepted, but only under the condition that Mady release his sister into his custody. After being informed, the sister agreed to the sacrifice, the genie complied, and hence, the birth of the legendary kora. Aside from oral testimony, historians propose that the kora appeared with the apogee of war chiefs from Kaabu, allowing the tradition to spread throughout the Mande area until it was made popular by Koryang Moussa Diabate in the 19th century.

=== Religion ===
Kaabu was explicitly a non-Islamic state. The most important shrine was that of the snake Tamba Dibi, set in a sacred forest of tabo trees whose fruit could supposedly protect warriors from harm.

== See also ==
- Mali Empire
- Battle of Kansala
- Imamate of Futa Jallon
- Portuguese Guinea
- History of Guinea-Bissau
- Guelowar

== Bibliography ==
- Barry, Boubacar (1998). Senegambia and the Atlantic Slave Trade. Cambridge: Cambridge University Press. pp. 388 Pages. ISBN 0-521-59226-7.
- Clark, Andrew F. & Lucie Colvin Phillips (1994). Historical Dictionary of Senegal. Metuchen: The Scarecrow Press, Inc. pp. 370 Pages. ISBN 0-8108-2747-6.
- Glovsky, David (2020). Belonging beyond boundaries : constructing a transnational community in a West African borderland (PhD). Michigan State University. doi:10.25335/4hjk-3y48.
- Lobban, Richard (1979). Historical dictionary of the Republics of Guinea-Bissau and Cape Verde. Metuchen: The Scarecrow Press. pp. 193 Pages. ISBN 0-8108-1240-1.
- Mane, Daouda (2021). "La Question des Origines et de l'Emergence de l'Etat de Kaabu". In Fall, Mamadou; Fall, Rokhaya; Mane, Mamadou (eds.). Bipolarisation du Senegal du XVIe - XVIIe siecle (in French). Dakar: HGS Editions. pp. 237–283.
- Ogot, Bethwell A. (1999). General History of Africa V: Africa from the Sixteenth to the Eighteenth Century. Berkeley: University of California Press. pp. 512 Pages. ISBN 0-520-06700-2.
- Niane, Djibril Tamsir (1989). Histoire des Mandingues de l'Ouest: le royaume du Gabou. KARTHALA Editions. pp. 221 Pages. ISBN 9782865372362.
