= Timeline of Dakar =

The following is a timeline of the history of the city of Dakar, capital of present-day Senegal.

== Prior to 18th century ==
- pre-15th century - arrival of the Lebou on the Cap-Vert peninsula.
- 1448 - Álvaro Fernandes lands on Goree island, enslaves some locals
- 1501 - During a stopover in Dakar bay, Amerigo Vespucci began to construct his "New World" hypothesis about America.
- 1549 - Battle of Danki, Cayor breaks away from the Jolof Empire
- mid-17th century - foundation of the Lebou village of Ndakaaru.
- 1677 - Capture of Goree by a French fleet led by Jean d'Estrées.

== 18th century ==
- 1786 - Dakar had around 5000 inhabitants, and was one of the largest towns of Cayor.
- 1795 -
  - Revolt of the Marabouts of Cayor.
  - Defeat of the marabout army by royalist forces at Loofe
  - Retreat and fortification of the Cap-vert peninsula
  - Repulse of the royalist attack
  - Proclamation of the Lebou Republic

== 19th century ==
- 1812 - Cayor recognizes the independence of the Lebou Republic.
- 1857
  - Gorée merchants settle in Dakar.
  - French build fort on Dakar Point.
- 1862 – "Master plan for Dakar is drafted by Émile Pinet-Laprade."
- 1863
  - Streets named.
  - Catholic Apostolic Vicariate of Senegambia established.
- 1867 - Port was opened for commerce.
- 1872 – Town becomes part of the commune of Gorée.
- 1878 – Population: 1,600.
- 1885
  - Rue Blanchot mosque built (approximate date).
  - Opening of the Dakar–Saint-Louis railway (163 miles long).
- 1887
  - Dakar commune formed.
  - Jean Alexandre becomes mayor.
- 1891 – Population: 8,737.
- 1900 – "Military seaport" built.

== 20th century ==
=== 1900s–1950s ===
- 1902 – Capital of French West Africa moved to Dakar from Saint-Louis.
- 1903 – Hann Park created.
- 1904
  - Avenue Gambetta, Avenue de la Liberté, and Boulevard de la République open.
  - Population: 18,447.
- 1905 – Brest-Dakar telegraph in operation.
- 1907
  - Government Palace built.
  - L'A.O.F. newspaper begins publication.
- 1908 – Harbor constructed.
- 1913
  - Democratie du Senegal newspaper begins publication.
  - National Archives of Senegal formed.
- 1914
  - Train station opens.
  - Bubonic plague epidemic.
- 1918
  - French West Africa School of Medicine established.
  - Population: 25,468.
- 1920 – Blaise Diagne becomes mayor.
- 1921 – Population: 32,440.
- 1924 – Dakar–Niger Railway begins operating.
- 1926 – Population: 33,679.
- 1929
  - Gorée annexed to Dakar.
  - Société des brasseries de l'Ouest africain formed.
- 1933
  - Paris-Dakar newspaper begins publication.
  - Foyer France Sénégal football club formed.
- 1934 – Armand-Pierre Angrand becomes mayor.
- 1936 – Catholic Cathédrale du Souvenir africain de Dakar inaugurated.
- 1938 - Institut Français d’Afrique Noire and museum founded.
- 1940 - Battle of Dakar.
- 1940s – Mama Casset photo studio in business.
- 1944 – Thiaroye Massacre.
- 1950 – Cours Sainte Marie de Hann founded.
- 1957 – University of Dakar established.
- 1959
  - City becomes capital of Mali Federation.
  - French Cultural Centre created.

=== 1960s–1990s ===
- 1960 – École de Dakar (art) movement active.
- 1961
  - Dakar-Matin newspaper begins publication.
  - Population: 374,700 urban agglomeration.
- 1962 – House of Slaves (Gorée) museum opens.
- 1963
  - December: Political demonstration; crackdown.
  - Borom Sarret film released (set in Dakar).
- 1964 - Dakar Grand Mosque built.
- 1966
  - Daniel Sorano Theatre opens (approximate date).
  - Amity Stadium opens (approximate date).
  - World Festival of Black Arts held.
- 1969 – Population: 581,000 urban agglomeration.
- 1970
  - Le Soleil newspaper begins publication.
  - Club Baobab opens.
- 1972 – Enda Third World and Centre Culturel Régional Blaise Senghor established.
- 1973 – Council for the Development of Social Science Research in Africa headquartered in Dakar.
- 1974 – Laboratoire Agit'Art (art group) formed.
- 1975 – Association Nationale des Bibliothécaires, Archivistes et Documentalistes Senegalais headquartered in city.
- 1978 – Dakar Rally motor vehicle race begins.
- 1984
  - Mamadou Diop becomes mayor.
  - WalFadjri newspaper begins publication.
- 1989
  - May: Meeting of the Organisation internationale de la Francophonie held in city.
  - Musée historique du Sénégal à Gorée opens.
  - Ethnic violence.
- 1990
  - Dakar Biennale begins.
  - Public library established.
  - Sét Sétal art movement develops.
  - Population: 1,405,000 (urban agglomeration).
- 1993
  - Sud Quotidien begins publication.
  - West African Research Center established.
- 1994
  - Henriette-Bathily Women's Museum opens.
  - Kermel market burns down.
- 1995 – Population: 1,688,000 (urban agglomeration).
- 1996
  - Municipal administration divided into 19 communes d'arrondissement: Biscuiterie, Cambérène, Dieuppeul-Derklé, Fann-Point E-Amitié, Gueule Tapée-Fass-Colobane, Gorée, Grand Yoff, Grand Dakar, Hann Bel-Air, HLM, Médina, Mermoz-Sacré-Cœur, Ngor, Ouakam, Parcelles Assainies, Patte d'Oie, Dakar-Plateau, Sicap-Liberté, and Yoff.^{(fr)}
  - City becomes part of Dakar Department, Dakar Region.
  - Musée des Forces Armées Senegalaise established.
- 1997
  - Media Centre de Dakar in operation.
  - Mosquée de la Divinité built.
- 1998 – Doole community exchange system established.
- 1999 – Festival international du film de quartier de Dakar begins.
- 2000 – Population: 2,029,000 (urban agglomeration).

== 21st century ==
- 2001 – Student protests.
- 2002 – Pape Diop becomes mayor.
- 2003
  - Le Quotidien newspaper begins publication.
  - West Africa Democracy Radio begins broadcasting.
  - Meeting of the Association Internationale des Maires Francophones held in city.
  - Closure of the Dakar–Saint-Louis railway, (approx date)
- 2005 – Population: 2,434,000 (urban agglomeration), 1,030,594 (city).
- 2006 – City hosts African Swimming Championships.
- 2007 – June: Economic protest.
- 2008 - Raw Material Company (art space) founded.
- 2009
  - City website online (approximate date).
  - Khalifa Sall becomes mayor.
- 2010 – African Renaissance Monument dedicated.
- 2011
  - City hosts World Social Forum and ICANN conference.
  - Google office in business.
  - Population: 3,035,000.
- 2013
  - June: U.S. President Obama visits city.
  - Air pollution in Dakar reaches annual mean of 34 PM2.5 and 141 PM10, much higher than recommended.
- 2014
  - November: Meeting of the Organisation internationale de la Francophonie held in city.
  - Statue of Léopold Sédar Senghor installed.
- 2025 – Charles de Gaulle Boulevard was renamed after former Senegalese Prime Minister Mamadou Dia.
- 2026 – 2026 Summer Youth Olympics held.

== See also ==
- Dakar history (fr)
- List of mayors of Dakar
- List of heritage sites in the Dakar Region
- Timeline of Senegal
- Timeline of Saint-Louis, Senegal

== Bibliography ==
=== in English ===
published in 20th century

- "Dakar" . Encyclopædia Britannica. Vol. 7 (11th ed.). 1910. p. 762.
- Derwent Whittlesey (1941). "Dakar and the Other Cape Verde Settlements". Geographical Review. 31 (4): 609–638. Bibcode:1941GeoRv..31..609W. doi:10.2307/210502. JSTOR 210502.
- Raymond F. Betts (April 1971). "Establishment of the Medina in Dakar, Senegal, 1914". Africa: Journal of the International African Institute. 41 (2): 143–152. doi:10.2307/1159424. JSTOR 1159424. S2CID 143324799.
- M. Diouf. (1999). "Urban youth and Senegalese politics: Dakar 1988-1994", In J. Holston, ed., Cities and Citizenship. Durham, NC: Duke University Press

published in 21st century

- Fiona McLaughlin (2001). "Dakar Wolof and the Configuration of an Urban Identity". Journal of African Cultural Studies. 14 (2).
- Dickson Eyoh and Paul Tiyambe Zeleza, ed. (2003). "Dakar". Encyclopedia of Twentieth-Century African History. Routledge. ISBN 978-0415234795.
- Kwame Anthony Appiah and Henry Louis Gates, ed. (2005). "Dakar". Africana: The Encyclopedia of the African and African American Experience (2nd ed.). Oxford University Press. p. 304. ISBN 978-0-19-517055-9.
- Kevin Shillington, ed. (2005). "Dakar". Encyclopedia of African History. Fitzroy Dearborn. ISBN 978-1-57958-245-6.
- David Nelson (2007). "Defining the Urban: The Construction of French-Dominated Colonial Dakar, 1857-1940". Historical Reflections. 33 (2): 225–255. JSTOR 41299411.
- Mamadou Diouf (2008). "(Re)Imagining an African city: performing culture, arts, and citizenship in Dakar (Senegal), 1980-2000". In Gyan Prakash and Kevin Michael Kruse (ed.). Spaces of the Modern City: Imaginaries, Politics, and Everyday Life. Princeton University Press. p. 346+. ISBN 978-0-691-13343-0.
- Simon Bekker and Goran Therborn, ed. (2011), "Dakar", Capital Cities in Africa: Power and Powerlessness, Dakar: Council for the Development of Social Science Research in Africa, ISBN 978-2-8697-8495-6
- Liora Bigon; Yossi Katz, eds. (2014). "From metropolitan to colonial planning: Dakar between garden city and cité-jardin". Garden Cities and Colonial Planning. Manchester University Press. ISBN 978-1-5261-0678-0.
- Profile of Crime Markets in Dakar, Pretoria: Institute for Security Studies, 2014 – via International Relations and Security Network
- Daniel Castillo Hidalgo (2014). "Port of Dakar: Technological Evolution, Management and Commercial Activity". In Miguel Bosa Suirez (ed.). Atlantic Ports and the First Globalisation C. 1850–1930. Palgrave Macmillan. ISBN 978-1-137-32798-7.
- Liora Bigon (2016). French Colonial Dakar: the Morphogenesis of an African Regional Capital. Manchester University Press. ISBN 978-1-78499-786-1. (Includes timeline)

=== in French ===
- Boulegue, Jean (2013). Les royaumes wolof dans l'espace sénégambien (XIIIe-XVIIIe siècle). Paris: Karthala Editions.
- Ch. Brossard, ed. (1906). "Afrique occidentale française: Senegal: Description des villes: Dakar". Colonies françaises. Géographie pittoresque et monumentale de la France (in French). Paris: Flammarion. hdl:2027/mdp.39015005579753. (+ table of contents)
- Claude Faure (1914). Histoire de la presqu'ile du Cap Vert et des origines de Dakar (in French). Paris: Emile Larose.
- Jacques Charpy (1958). La Fondation De Dakar, 1845-1857-1869 (in French). Paris. OCLC 8248635.
- Suzanne Daveau [in Portuguese] (1959). "Une enquête urbaine à Dakar". L'Information géographique (in French). 23 (5): 211–215. doi:10.3406/ingeo.1959.1940 – via Persee.fr.
- Assane Seck (1961). "Dakar". Cahiers d'Outre-Mer (in French). 14 – via Persee.fr.
- Assane Seck (1970). Dakar, metropole ouest-africaine (in French). Dakar. OCLC 813651508.
- Denise Bouche (1978). "Dakar pendant la deuxième Guerre mondiale: Problèmes de surpeuplement". Revue française d'histoire d'outre-mer (in French). 65 (240): 423–438. doi:10.3406/outre.1978.2135 – via Persee.fr.
- Alain Sinou (1993). Comptoirs et villes coloniales du Senegal: Saint-Louis, Goree, Dakar (in French). Paris.
- Thomas Saupique (2002). "L'électrification de la ville de Dakar après 1945". Outre-mers (in French). 89 – via Persee.fr.
- Abdoul Aziz Diop (2007). "Quelles centralités pour la ville de Dakar, Sénégal?". Rives nord-méditerranéennes (in French). 26 (26): 75–92. doi:10.4000/rives.921 – via Revues.org.
- "Histoire". Dakar. Le Petit Futé (in French). 2011. p. 21+.
