= Grand Dakar Arrondissement =

- Arrondissement
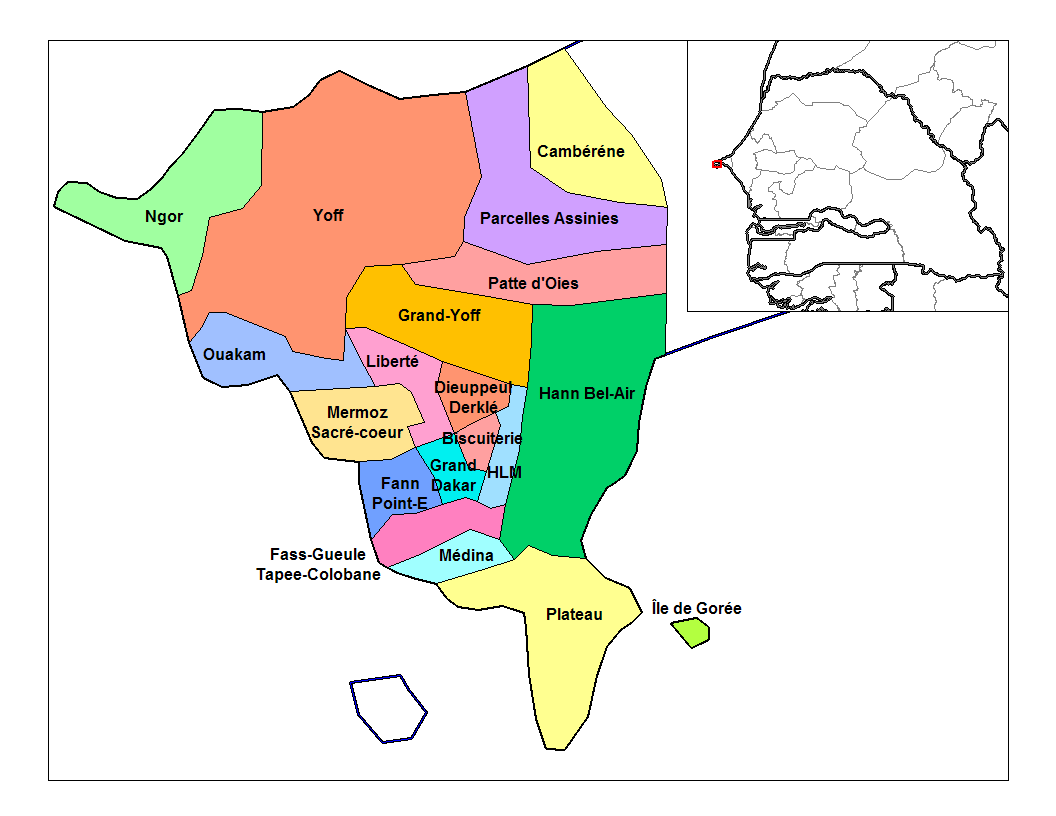
- Coordinates: 14°42′15″N 17°27′12″W
- Country: Senegal
- Region: Dakar Region
- Department: Dakar Department

Area
  - Total: 19 km^{2} (7.3 sq mi)

Population (2013 census)
  - Total: 306,728
  - Density: 16,000/km^{2} (42,000/sq mi)
- Time zone: UTC±00:00 (GMT)

Grand Dakar Arrondissement is an arrondissement of the Dakar Department in the Dakar Region of Senegal.

It is divided into 6 communes d'arrondissement: Biscuiterie, Dieuppeul-Derklé, Grand Dakar, Hann Bel-Air, H.L.M. and Sicap-Liberté.
