= Hann, Senegal =

Neighborhood in Dakar, Senegal

Coordinates: 14°43′16″N 17°26′13″W

Hann is a neighbourhood of Dakar, the capital of Senegal. It is located on the eastern side of the small south facing peninsula on which the old city of Dakar was built. Hann neighborhood sits along a crescent shaped beach called Hann Bay. Hann is part of the Hann Bel-Air commune d'arrondissement: a part of the municipal Dakar Department which covers the city of Dakar. Hann is one of the four original Lebou villages of the Cap-Vert Peninsula, along with Yoff, Ngor, and Ouakam.

== Neighbourhood ==
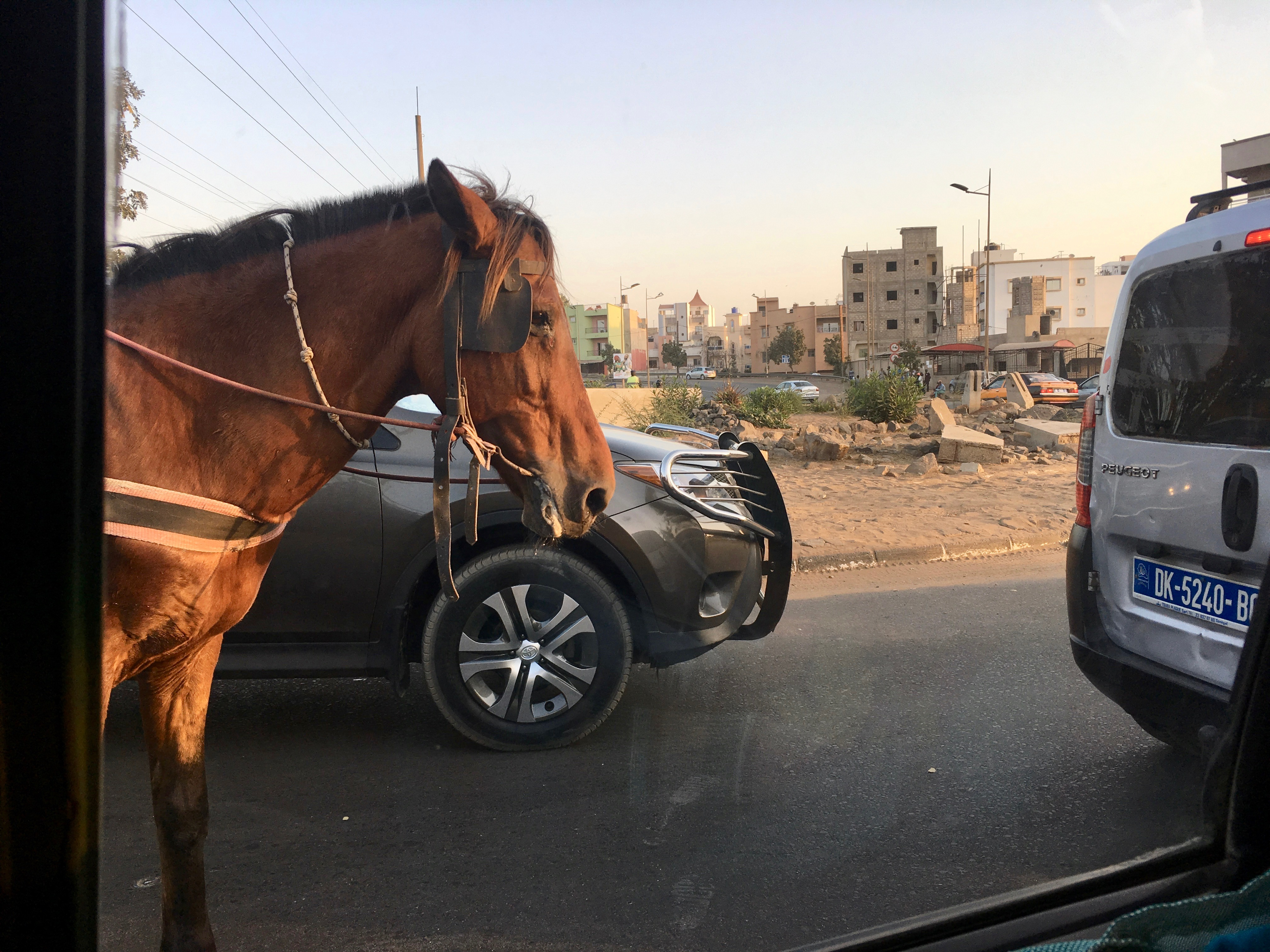
Road transport in Hann

Hann sits just north of the Bel-Air peninsula, a rocky outcropping which juts east from the Dakar Plateau. To the south is the Port of Dakar. To the west is the HLM and Grand Yoff neighbourhoods. To the north is Patte d'Oie and to the northeast, Niayes. Gently sloping from the higher plateau of the city centre, Hann forms a long crescent sand beach, also known as Yarakh.

Among the landmarks of Hann is the large park Parc Forestier de Hann, laying just northeast of the Dakar city center, the Parc Zoologique de Hann, and Cours Sainte Marie de Hann private school. The area, once a fishing village still is a launching point for the pirogues of local fishermen, is today dominated by large industrial development.

== Environmental damage ==
Hann Bay sits just north of the industrial area of the Port of Dakar. Once a small fishing village, Hann beach became a local beauty spot near the centre of Dakar. By the beginning of the 21st century, 71 factories discharging industrial effluent along the Hann shore had given the area the nickname "Trash Bay." In January 2009, the Senegalese government announced a €50m loan from France and the European Investment Bank to fund a Senegalese National Office for Decontamination (ONAS) project to clean up Hann Bay. It would be Senegal's first large scale industrial cleanup project. The plan was to clean the area and create an industrial canal to divert effluent to a new waste treatment plant. A cleanup project was launched in 2018, but has not had significant impact.

== Transport ==
Since 2006, the terminus of the Dakar–Niger Railway has been cut back to Hann.

In 2016, construction of the Train Express Regional started.

== See also ==
- Hann Bel-Air: the subdivision of Dakar in which Hann is located.
- Railway stations in Senegal
