= Parcelles Assainies Arrondissement =

- Arrondissement
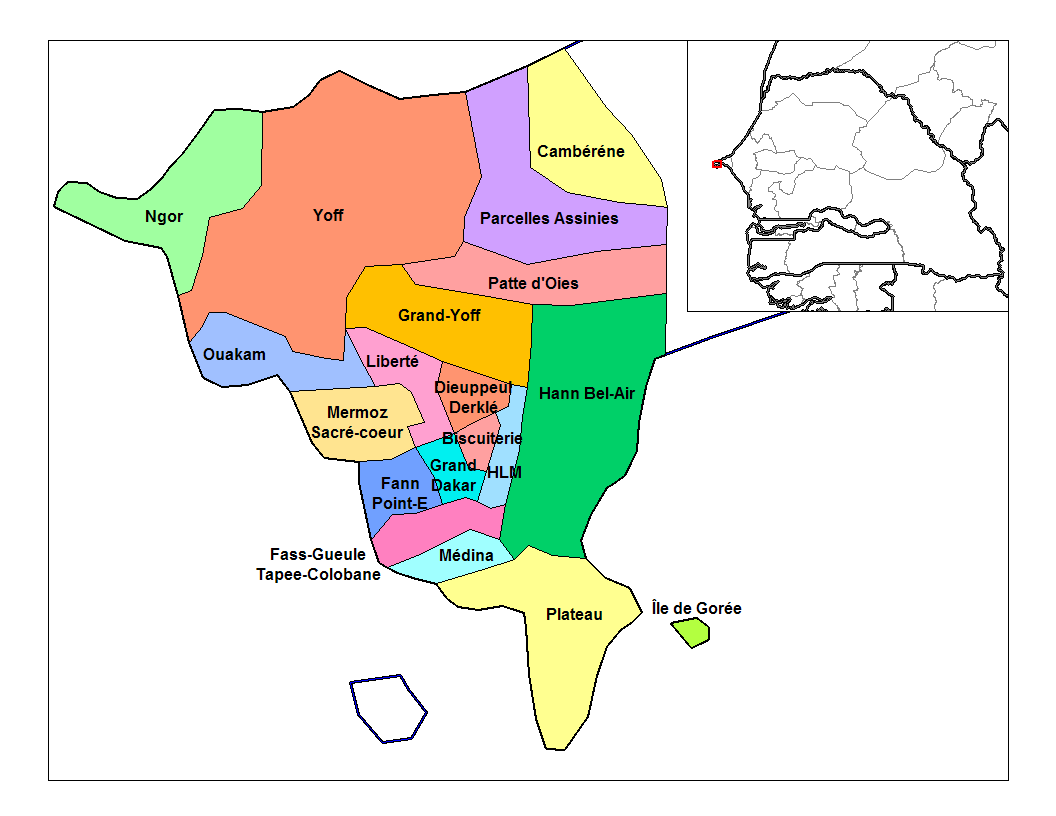
- Country: Senegal
- Region: Dakar Region
- Department: Dakar Department

Area
  - Total: 15 km^{2} (5.8 sq mi)

Population (2013 census)
  - Total: 438,527
  - Density: 29,000/km^{2} (76,000/sq mi)
- Time zone: UTC±00:00 (GMT)

Parcelles Assainies Arrondissement is an arrondissement of the Dakar Department in the Dakar Region of Senegal.

It is divided into 4 commune d'arrondissements; Cambérène, Grand Yoff, Parcelles Assainies and Patte d'Oie.
