= Almadies Arrondissement =

- Arrondissement
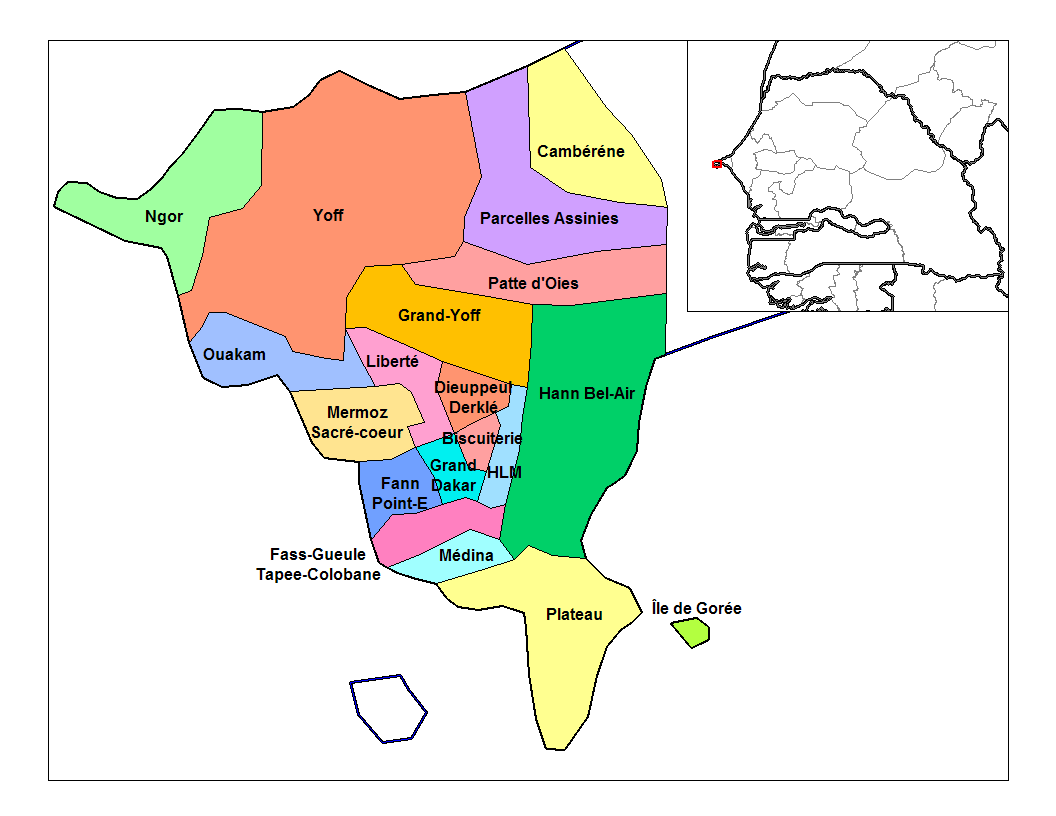

- Location within Senegal
- Coordinates: 14.725°N 17.4833°W
- Country: Senegal
- Region: Dakar Region
- Department: Dakar Department

Area
  - Total: 30 km^{2} (12 sq mi)

Population (2013 census)
  - Total: 211,315
  - Density: 7,000/km^{2} (18,000/sq mi)
- Time zone: UTC±00:00 (GMT)

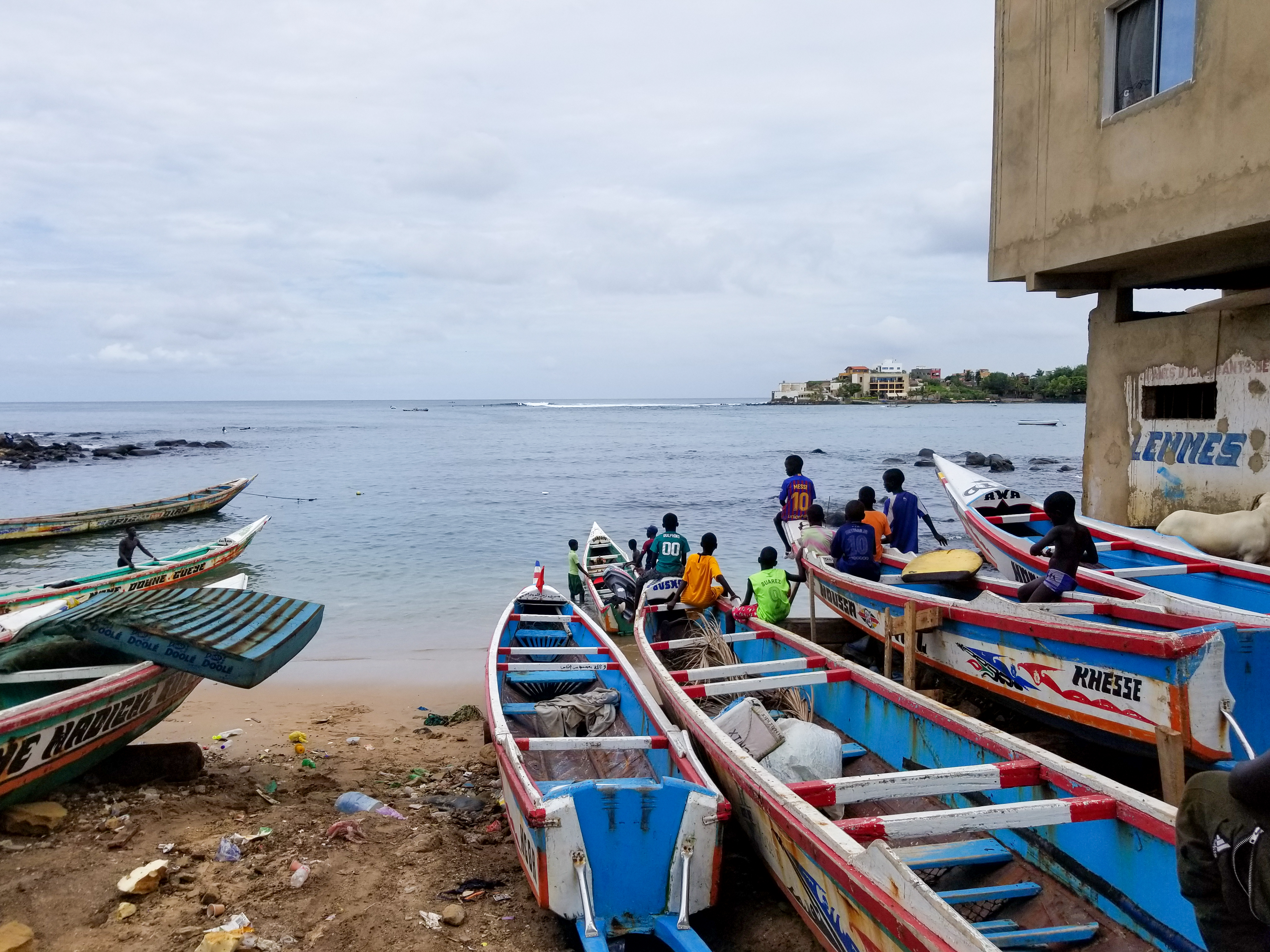
Boys in Ngor village

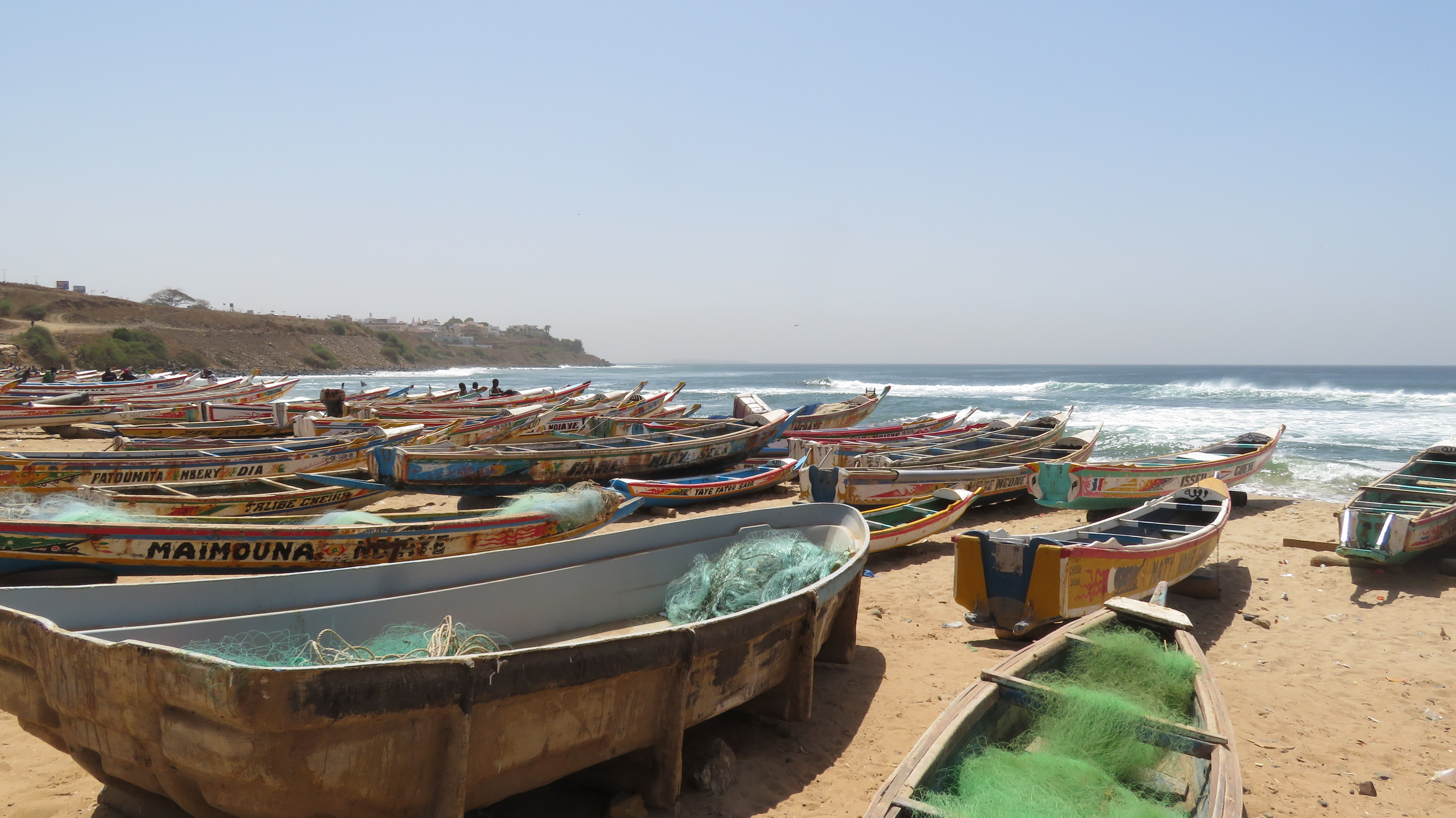
Fishing boats on Ouakam beach

Almadies Arrondissement is an arrondissement of the Dakar Department in the Dakar Region of Senegal. Almadies is considered the most upmarket residential neighbourhood in Central & Western Africa and it holds the residences of numerous foreign Ambassadors and expatriates. It is also considered one of the most expensive and premiere neighbourhoods in Africa. It also holds numerous Embassies and agencies of the UN.

Located at the western end of the peninsula of Cape Verde, it is dominated by the two hills of Mamelles.

It is divided into 4 communes d'arrondissement; Mermoz-Sacré-Coeur, Ngor, Ouakam and Yoff.
