= Hann Bel-Air =

Coordinates: 14°42′37″N 17°26′06″W

- Commune d'arrondissement
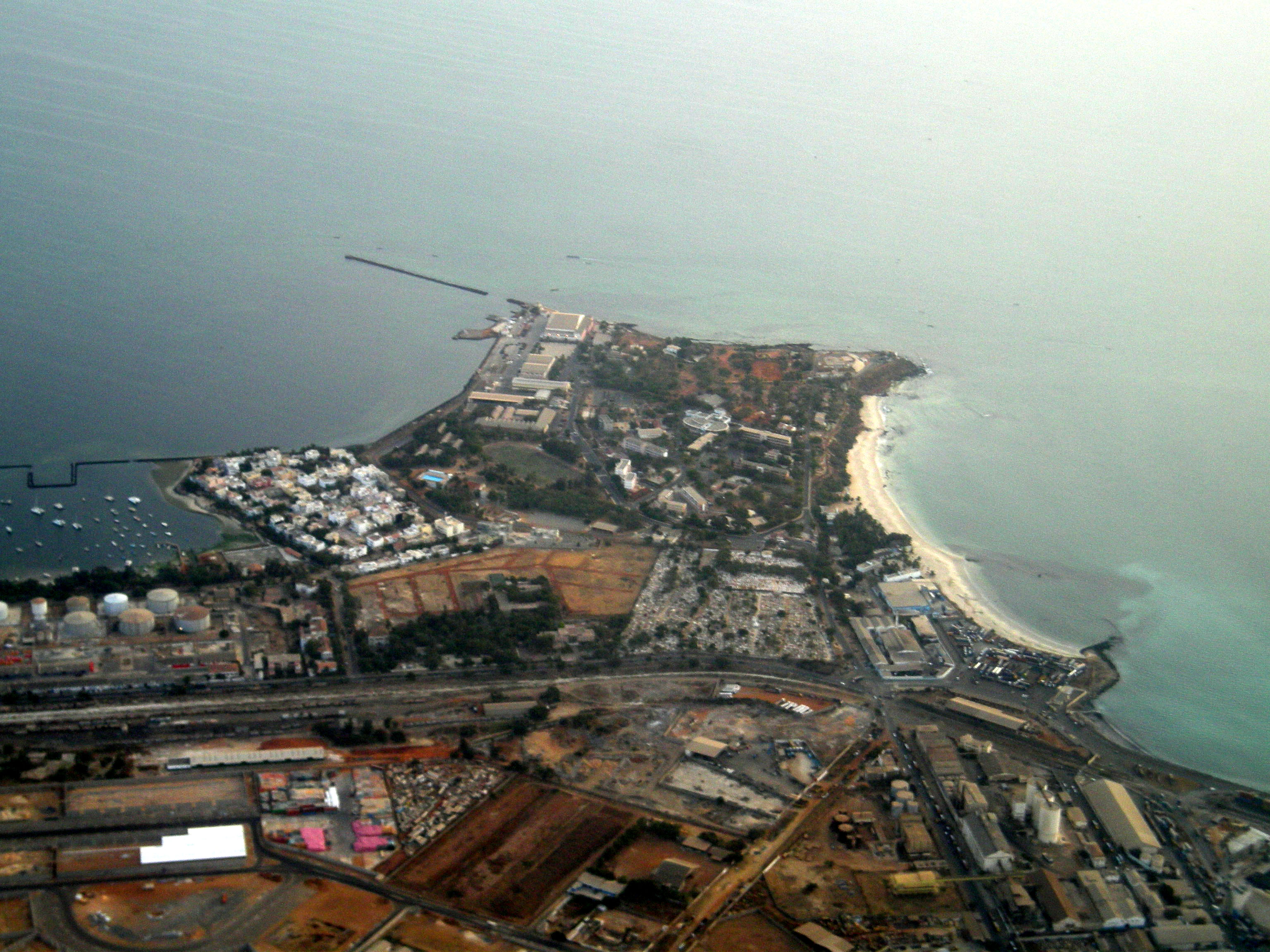
- Looking east: Bel-air peninsula, with Hann Bay beginning to the left.

- Hann Bel-Air location
- Country: Senegal
- Region: Dakar Region
- Department: Dakar Department

Area
  - Total: 12 km^{2} (4.6 sq mi)

Population (2013)
  - Total: 67,962
  - Density: 5,700/km^{2} (15,000/sq mi)
- Time zone: UTC+0 (GMT)

Hann Bel-Air is a commune d'arrondissement of the city of Dakar, Senegal.

== Neighbourhoods ==
The Arrondissement comprises both the neighbourhoods of Bel-Air and Hann. Bel-Air, to the south, is the rocky plateau which juts east into the bay away from the city centre. It lies directly north of the Port of Dakar. Hann, a crescent of low beach as Cap Vert turns to the east, was a fishing village that has become a major industrial site. It also includes Hann Park and Zoological gardens.

== Location ==
It is situated to the south of the Dakar city center, Dakar Plateau, and the Port of Dakar. To the west is the HLM and Grand Yoff neighbourhoods. To the north is Patte d'Oie and to the northeast, Niayes. As of 2013, the arrondissement had a population of 67,962.

== See also ==
- Dakar
- Hann, Senegal
