= Rufisque Arrondissement =

- Arrondissement
- Interactive map of Rufisque Arrondissement
- Country: Senegal
- Region: Dakar Region
- Department: Rufisque Department
- Time zone: UTC±00:00 (GMT)

Rufisque Arrondissement is an arrondissement of the Rufisque Department in the Dakar Region of Senegal. The principal town is Rufisque.
