= Mamadou Diop (politician) =

Senegalese politician

Mamadou Diop (9 May 1936 – 26 March 2018) was a Senegalese politician, and a member of the central committee of the Socialist Party of Senegal. Diop was the mayor of the capital city of Dakar for 18 years between 1984 and 2002.

He was a member of the Lebou ethnic group.

== See also ==
- List of mayors of Dakar
- Timeline of Dakar
