= Vehicle registration plates of Senegal =

Senegal
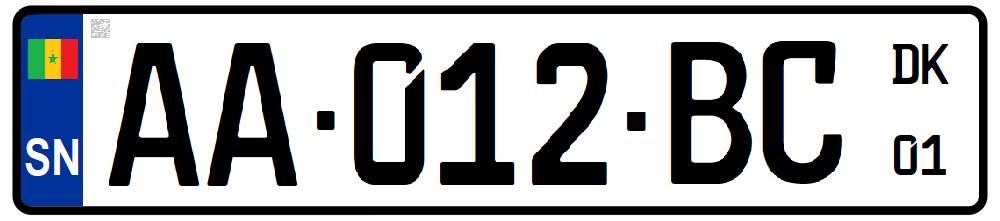
- Current regular legal standard number plate from Senegal.
- Country: Senegal
- Country code: SN

Current series
- Size: 520 mm × 110 mm 20.5 in × 4.3 in
- Serial format: AB-123-CD
- Colour (front): Black on white
- Colour (rear): Black on white

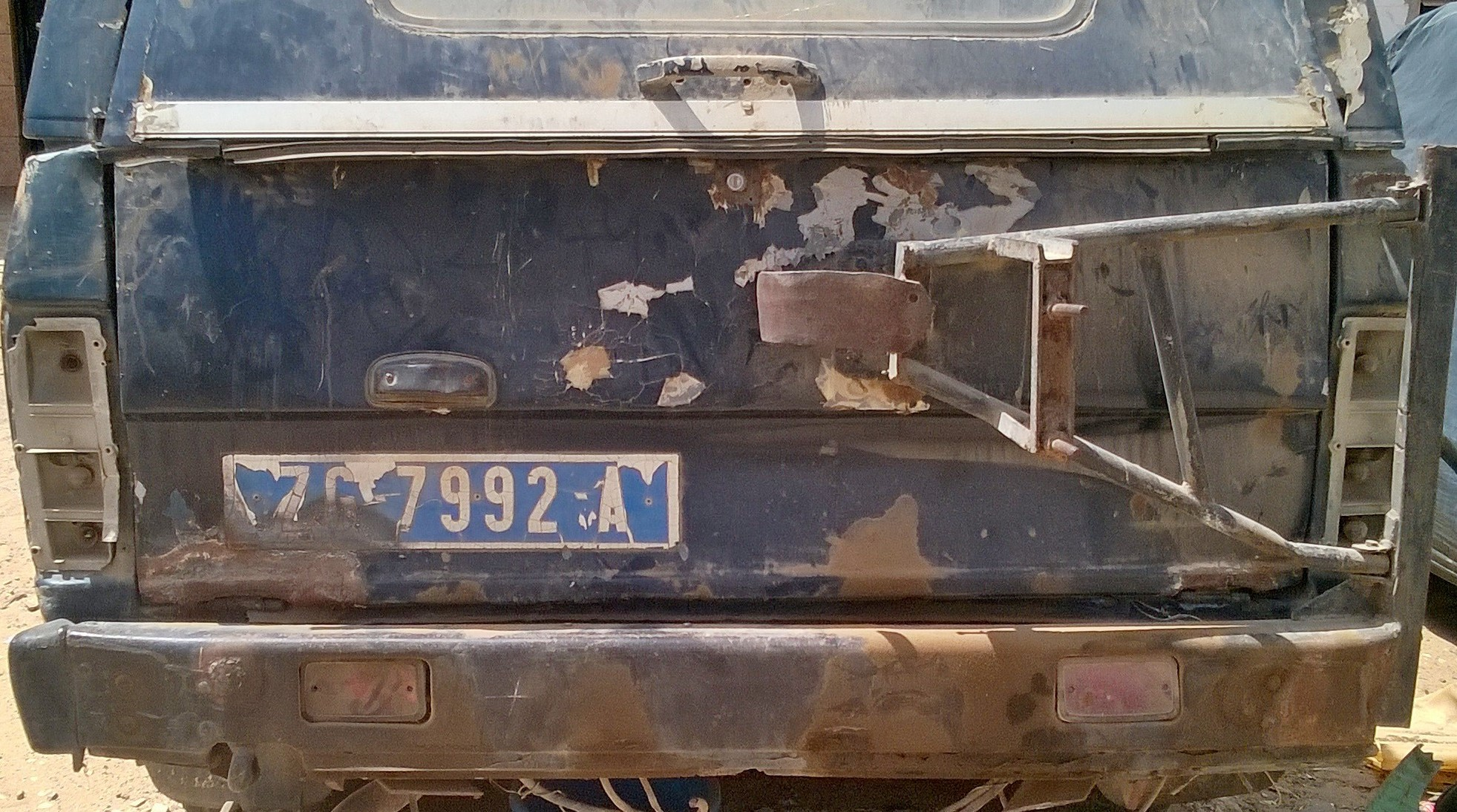
Pre 2009 License plate from Ziguinchor Region

Senegal requires its residents to register their motor vehicles and display vehicle registration plates.

Dates issued	Image	Vehicle Type	Design	Serial format	Notes
1989-2019		Passenger Vehicles, Trucks, and Buses	52 cm x 11 cm White on Blue. Some versions from 2000s included a country strip as well	XX-1234-A; XX-1234-AB	XX indicates the two-letter regional code. DK indicates Dakar Region for example.
2019-Present		Passenger Vehicles, Front of Trucks, and Front of Buses	52 cm x 11 cm Text height 7.5 cm Black on White, with a blue Country Strip, including Flag and country-code SN.	AA-123-BC [XX/##]	XX indicates the two-letter regional code. DK indicates Dakar Region for example. ## indicates the two-letter department code within each region.
2019-Present		Rear of Trucks, and Rear of Buses	32 cm x 20 cm Text height 7.5 cm Black on White, with a blue Country Strip, including Flag and country-code SN.	AA-123-BC [XX/##]	XX indicates the two-letter regional code. DK indicates Dakar Region for example. ## indicates the two-letter department code within each region.
2019-Present		Motorcycles	24 cm x 13 cm Text height 4.5 cm Black on White, with a blue Country Strip, including Flag and country-code SN.	AA-123-BC [XX/##]	XX indicates the two-letter regional code. DK indicates Dakar Region for example. ## indicates the two-letter department code within each region.

== Regional Codes ==
Code	Subdivision name (fr)
DK	Dakar
DB	Diourbel
FK	Fatick
KA	Kaffrine
KL	Kaolack
KE	Kédougou
KD	Kolda
LG	Louga
MT	Matam
SL	Saint-Louis
SE	Sédhiou
TC	Tambacounda
TH	Thiès
ZG	Ziguinchor
