= Sakho =

Sakho is a surname of Senegalese origin. Notable people with the surname include:

- Diafra Sakho, Senegalese footballer
- Diogal Sakho, Senegalese musician
- Jordan Sakho, Congolese basketball player
- Lamine Sakho, Senegalese footballer
- Mamadou Sakho, French footballer
- Mamadou Sakho (wrestler), Senegalese wrestler
- Mohamed Sakho, Guinean footballer
- Sandro Sakho, Portuguese footballer
