= Plateau/Gorée Arrondissement =

- Arrondissement
- Interactive map of Plateau/Gorée Arrondissement
- Country: Senegal
- Region: Dakar Region
- Department: Dakar Department

Area
  - Total: 15 km^{2} (5.8 sq mi)

Population (2013 census)
  - Total: 189,486
  - Density: 13,000/km^{2} (33,000/sq mi)
- Time zone: UTC±00:00 (GMT)

Plateau/Gorée Arrondissement is one of the four arrondissements of the Dakar Department in the Dakar Region of Senegal. It contains the communes d'arrondissement Fann/Point E/Amité, Gueule Tapée/Fass/Colobane, Médina, Dakar Plateau, and Gorée.
