= Patte d'Oie (Dakar) =

Coordinates: 14°44′42″N 17°26′03″W

- Commune d'arrondissement
- Patte d'Oie location
- Country: Senegal
- Region: Dakar Region
- Department: Dakar Department

Area
  - Total: 3 km^{2} (1.2 sq mi)

Population (2013)
  - Total: 41,106
  - Density: 14,000/km^{2} (35,000/sq mi)
- Time zone: UTC+0 (GMT)

Patte d'Oie is a commune d'arrondissement of the city of Dakar, Senegal.
