= West African Research Center =

Senegalese-based research institute

The West African Research Center (WARC, French: Centre de recherche ouest-africain) is the overseas research center for the United States–based West African Research Association (WARA). It is located in Dakar, Senegal. WARC is a center for academic exchange between American and West African scholars that encourages research on the region of West Africa. The idea for the overseas center came about in May 1992 and was implemented in the fall of 1993. Since its inception, WARC has grown both in terms of staff and influence as it continues to connect researchers in the USA with researchers in the region of West Africa interested in common issues. Currently, WARC is headed by Dr. Ousmane Sene. It is located in the Fann-Point E-Amitié neighborhood of Dakar.

The center is a member of the Council of American Overseas Research Centers.

== Objectives ==
WARC promotes scholarly research on West Africa and the Diaspora and works to foster cooperation between American and West African researchers, students and artists, and seeks active participation of both West African and American scholars, WARC specifically aims to:

- Encourage collaborative research through a program of research fellowships and the organization of colloquia, seminars, and workshops on topics of both general and scholarly interest.
- Make available to West African and visiting researchers a research library, computer facilities, and a computer network.
- Provides a forum for local and foreign researchers.
- Promote interdisciplinary approaches and considerations of gender in the study of West Africa and the African Diaspora.
- Gathers, catalog, and disseminate the results of research on West Africa.

== Facilities ==
The West African Research Center has a conference, seminar, and round-table room. The Center also makes available for the West African Research Association members and other researchers, computer rooms with printers and access to the Internet, a Restaurant, a Library, and a research room.

The library was named after the late Dr. Mouhamed Moustapha Kane and was opened on February 7, 1998, by the Faculty of Arts's Dean, Mr. Oumar Kane in the presence of the late Moustapha Kane's family. It is composed of two reading areas and a reception/orientation office. In support of WARC's research dimension, one of the reading areas has been specifically reserved for researchers to allow them access to certain publications such as dissertations, periodicals, magazine reviews, etc. The second reading area is open to students and the public. Presently, the library has at its disposal over 3,000 volumes divided specially in the files Africa and Diaspora. It also has many collections of scientific magazines and memoirs.

Its sources of funding include Donations from essentially American or African researchers, students or institutions (American Cultural Center, Michigan State University Library, Late Moustapha Kane's family, African Studies from Columbia University/

== See also ==
- University of Dakar
