= Council of American Overseas Research Centers =

Organization

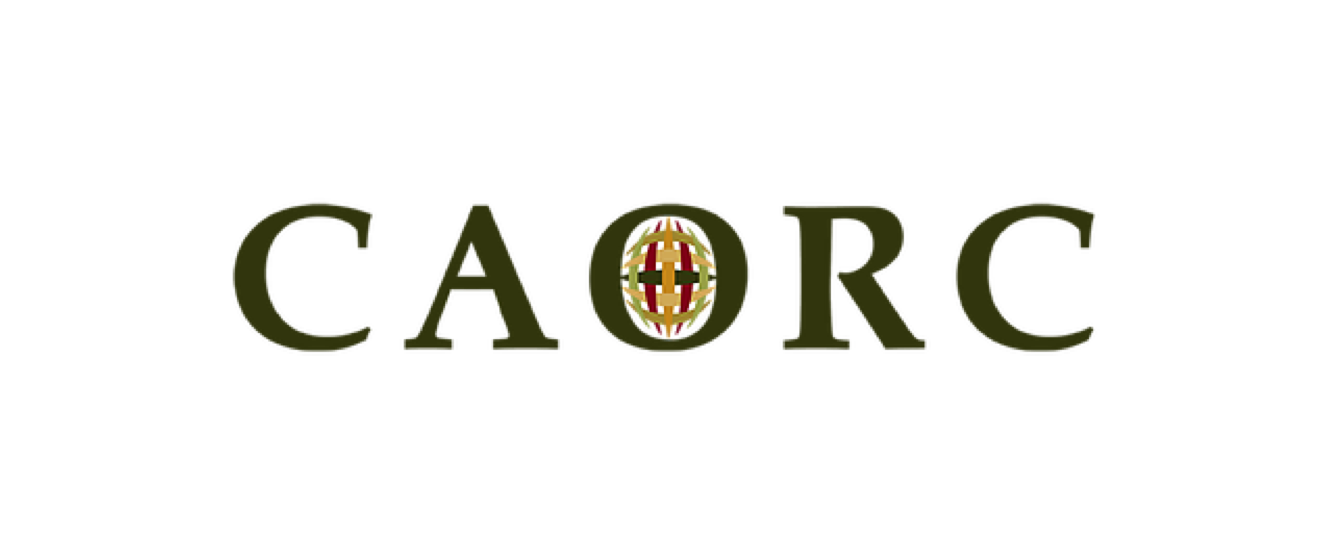
- Formation: 1981
- Type: NGO
- Headquarters: Washington, D.C., U.S.
- Key people: Mary Ellen Lane
- Website: caorc.org

The Council of American Overseas Research Centers (CAORC) founded in 1981, is a private not-for-profit federation of independent overseas research centers that promotes advanced research, particularly in the humanities and social sciences, with a focus on the conservation and recording of cultural heritage and the understanding and interpretation of modern societies.

== Funding ==
The council is funded in part by the United States Department of State's Bureau of Educational and Cultural Affairs, the Smithsonian Institution, the Andrew W. Mellon Foundation, the Carnegie Corporation of New York, as well as through fees paid by members.

== Fellowships ==
CAORC offers two fellowship programs, the NEH Research Fellowship and Multi-Country Research Fellowship. Member centers offer a number of fellowships, webinars, lectures, publications and a variety of opportunities, which can be found on their individual websites.

The CAORC – NEH Research Fellowship supports advanced research in the humanities for US scholars and scholars who have been resident in the US for at least three years. This program is funded by the National Endowment for the Humanities under the Fellowship Programs at Independent Research Institutions (FPIRI) .

== West African Acquisitions Pilot Project (WAAPP) ==
CAORC, in collaboration with the West African Research Center (WARC) in Dakar, Senegal, launched an initiative with the Library of Congress in 2010 to expand the collection of scholarly resources for U.S. and West African universities and institutions by collecting, documenting and digitizing published material and ephemera in eleven countries, including: Benin, Burkina Faso, Côte d'Ivoire, the Gambia, Guinea Conakry, Mali, Niger, Chad, Senegal, Sierra Leone and Togo.

The project is headquartered at the West African Research Center in Dakar, Senegal, and the collective activities are carried out by Bibliographic Representatives, who are librarians and archivists in their respective countries.

The West African Acquisitions Project provides access to an area of the world where it can often be difficult to obtain tangible and digital materials. The collection activities include acquiring materials published in the region that help showcase daily life, culture, social and political movements of West African countries. Examples of materials include newspapers, public health flyers and announcements throughout the pandemic, comics, monographs, maps, and e-books.
