= Biscuiterie =

Coordinates: 14°42′36″N 17°26′59″W

- Commune d'arrondissement
- Biscuiterie location
- Country: Senegal
- Region: Dakar Region
- Department: Dakar Department

Area
  - Total: 1 km^{2} (0.39 sq mi)

Population (2013)
  - Total: 68,547
  - Density: 69,000/km^{2} (180,000/sq mi)
- Time zone: UTC+0 (GMT)

Biscuiterie is a commune d'arrondissement of the city of Dakar, Senegal, part of the arrondissement of Grand Dakar. It is located in the centre-southern area of the city. As of 2007, it had a population of 56,932.

== Overview ==
La Biscuiterie owes its name to the eponymous "Biscuiterie" (also known as "Biscuiterie de Medina", "Biscuit factory of Medina"), a former biscuit factory that has been restructured into an exhibition venue. Among other art, craft, and urban culture exhibitions and events, la Biscuiterie has hosted the 2010 edition of the World Festival of Black Arts.
