= Diogal =

Senegalese singer and musician

- Born: January 1, 1970 (age 55); Ngor
- Occupation: Singer

Diogal Sakho (born 1970, Ngor, Dakar) is a Senegalese singer and musician.

He was born in a small Lebou community. He is a self-taught guitarist and composed his first songs when he was a child. He was discovered by Loy Ehrlich in 1996. He currently lives in France.

== Discography ==
- Samba alla, (Celluloïd/Mélodie), 2002
- Liir, (Celluloïd/Mélodie), 2004
- Li lan la, (D. Sakho/Wasia, 2008
