= Sébikhotane =

- Commune
- Location in Senegal
- Coordinates: 14°44′49″N 17°08′12″W
- Country: Senegal
- Region: Dakar Region
- Department: Rufisque Department

Area
  - Commune: 20.11 km^{2} (7.76 sq mi)

Population (2023 census)
  - Commune: 42,839
  - Density: 2,130/km^{2} (5,517/sq mi)
- Time zone: UTC+0 (GMT)

Sébikhotane is a town and urban commune in the Dakar Region of western Senegal. It is located in the Rufisque Department. The population in 2023 was 42,839.

Sébikotane is located 45 km east of Dakar. The village was founded by Sébikotane Sereres in 1736. A Catholic seminary was founded in 1911. It was the seat of a rural community from 1984 to 1996. The town received commune status in 1996. The population is mainly composed of farmers and farm workers.

== History ==
During the Holocaust, some Jews in Senegal were taken by the colonial Vichy administration to an internment camp in Sébikhotane for forced labor. The location of the internment camp has been found, but the functions of the buildings have not yet been identified. 2 Jewish refugees who had escaped Europe were captured in Dakar and temporarily taken to the Sébikhotane internment camp and then transferred to the Office du Niger, a large cotton farm in Mali where the French colonial authorities used slave labor. Centuries earlier, the Jewish community in Serer country were protected by the Serer kings and people, and allowed to practice their religion in peace. The Serer people are an ethnoreligious group who had resisted islamisation for one thousand years, and faced religious and ethnic persecution for centuries.
