= List of mayors of Dakar =

The following is a list of mayors of the city of Dakar, Senegal. Senegal was under French colonial rule until April 1960.

- Jean Alexandre, circa 1887
- Charles De Margueritte Monfort, circa 1892
- Jean Alexandre, circa 1896
- Fernand Marsat, 1898-1908
- Edmond Teisseire, circa 1903-1906
- André Masson, circa 1908
- Lavie, circa 1919
- Blaise Diagne, 1920-1934
- Jules Sergent, circa 1921
- Armand-Pierre Angrand, 1934-1939
- Martine, circa 1939
- Alfred Goux, 1943-1945
- Lamine Guèye, 1945-1961
- Joseph Gomis, 1961-1964
- Samba Guèye, 1964-1978
- Lamine Diack, 1978-1979
- Amadou Clédor Sall, 1979-1984
- Mamadou Diop, 1984-2002
- Pape Diop, 2002-2009
- Khalifa Ababacar Sall, 2009 to 2018
- Soham El Wardini, 2018 to 2022
- Barthélemy Dias, 2022 to 2024(Revoked)^{[5]}

== See also ==
- Timeline of Dakar
- Quatre Communes
- List of mayors of Saint-Louis, Senegal

== Bibliography ==
- Henri Jacques Légier (1968). "Institutions municipales et politique coloniale: les Communes du Sénégal". Revue française d'histoire d'outre-mer (in French). 55. doi:10.3406/outre.1968.1473 – via Persee.fr.
