= Mermoz-Sacré-Cœur =

Coordinates: 14°42′00″N 17°28′01″W

- Commune d'arrondissement
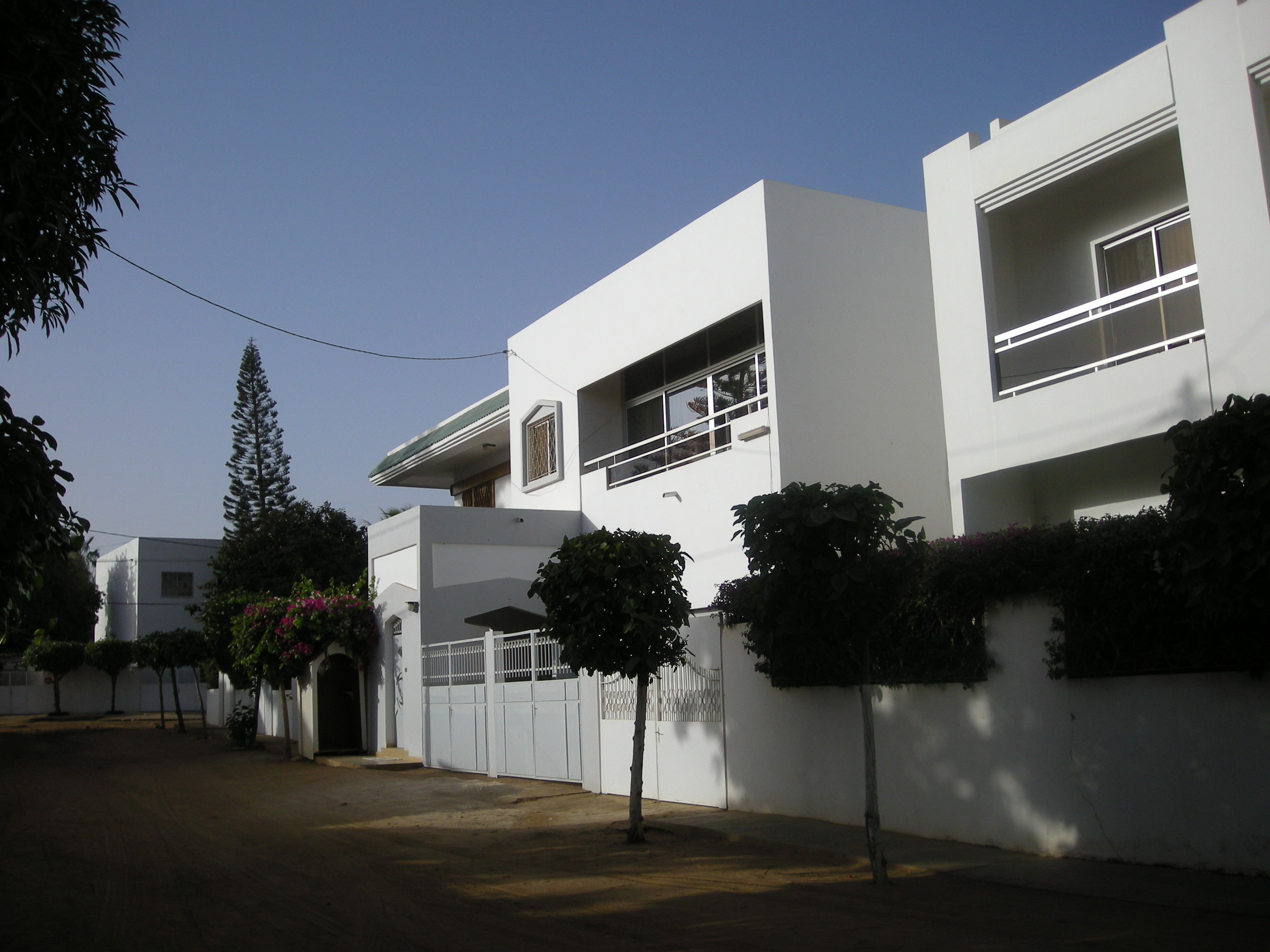

- Mermoz-Sacré-Cœur location
- Country: Senegal
- Region: Dakar Region
- Department: Dakar Department

Area
  - Total: 6 km^{2} (2.3 sq mi)

Population (2013)
  - Total: 29,798
  - Density: 5,000/km^{2} (13,000/sq mi)
- Time zone: UTC+0 (GMT)

Mermoz-Sacré-Cœur is a commune d'arrondissement of the city of Dakar, Senegal. It is located on the western coast of the Cap-Vert peninsula. As of 2013, it had a population of 29,798.

== Geography ==
Mermoz borders the Atlantic Ocean to the west. It also borders Ouakam to the north, Fann-Point E-Amitié to the south, and Sicap-Liberté to the northeast.

== History ==
The neighborhood is named after Jean Mermoz, a French pilot.

== Religion ==
There many mosques throughout the neighborhood. These include Grande mosquée de Mermoz, Mermoz Rawane Mbaye, Sacré-Cœur 3, Sacré-Cœur VDN, and Sicap Karak.

== Economy ==
The headquarters for Sonatel, a telephone company is located in the Cité Keur Gorgui neighborhood within Mermoz-Sacré-Cœur. Dakar Dem Dikk, a public transit company, is also based out of Mermoz-Sacré-Cœur.

== Sports ==
The AS Dakar Sacré-Cœur Football club is based out of Mermoz-Sacré-Cœur.

== Images ==
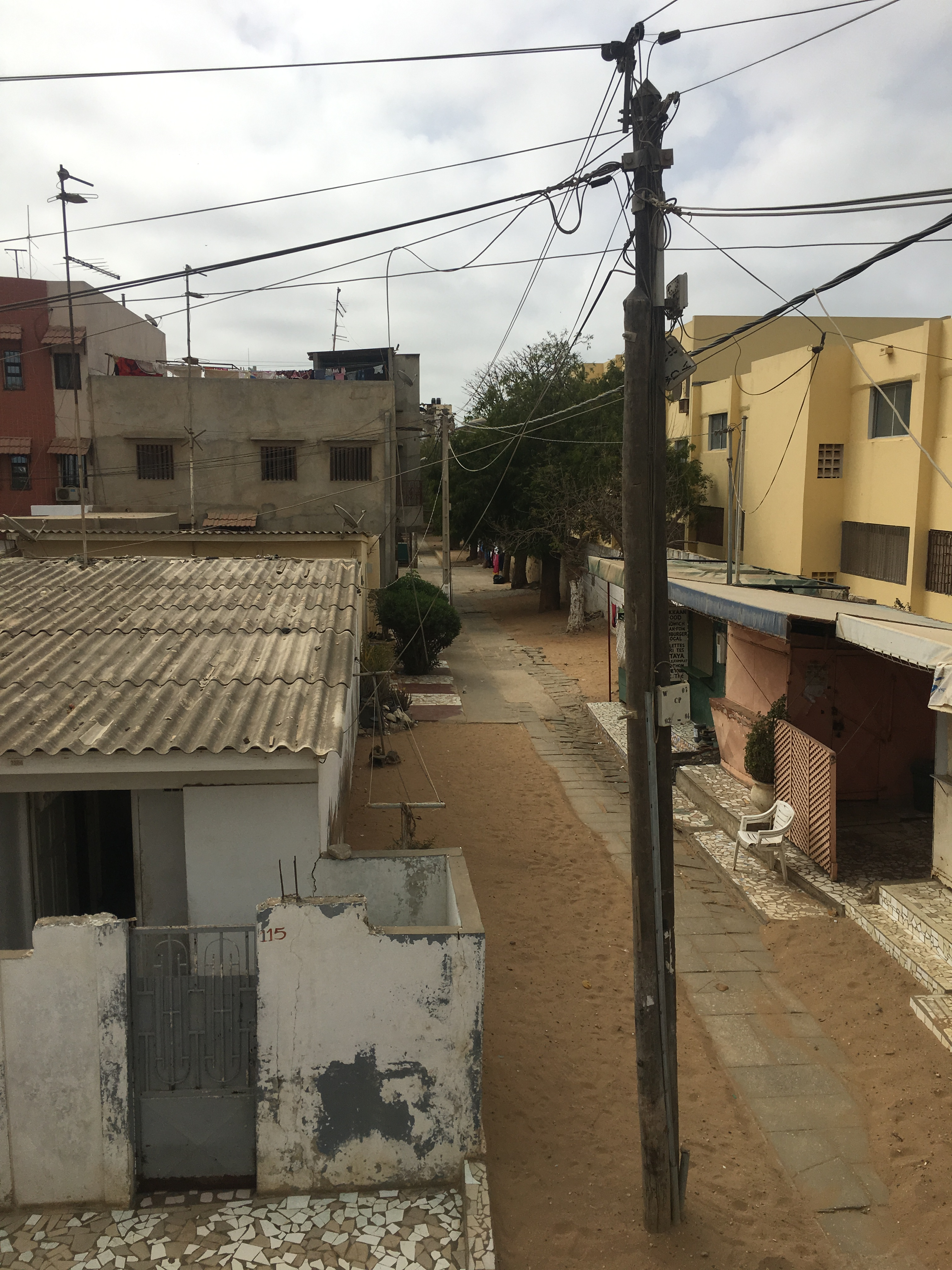
Mermoz Street View
