= Dakar-Plateau =

Coordinates: 14°40′31″N 17°25′13″W

- Commune d'arrondissement
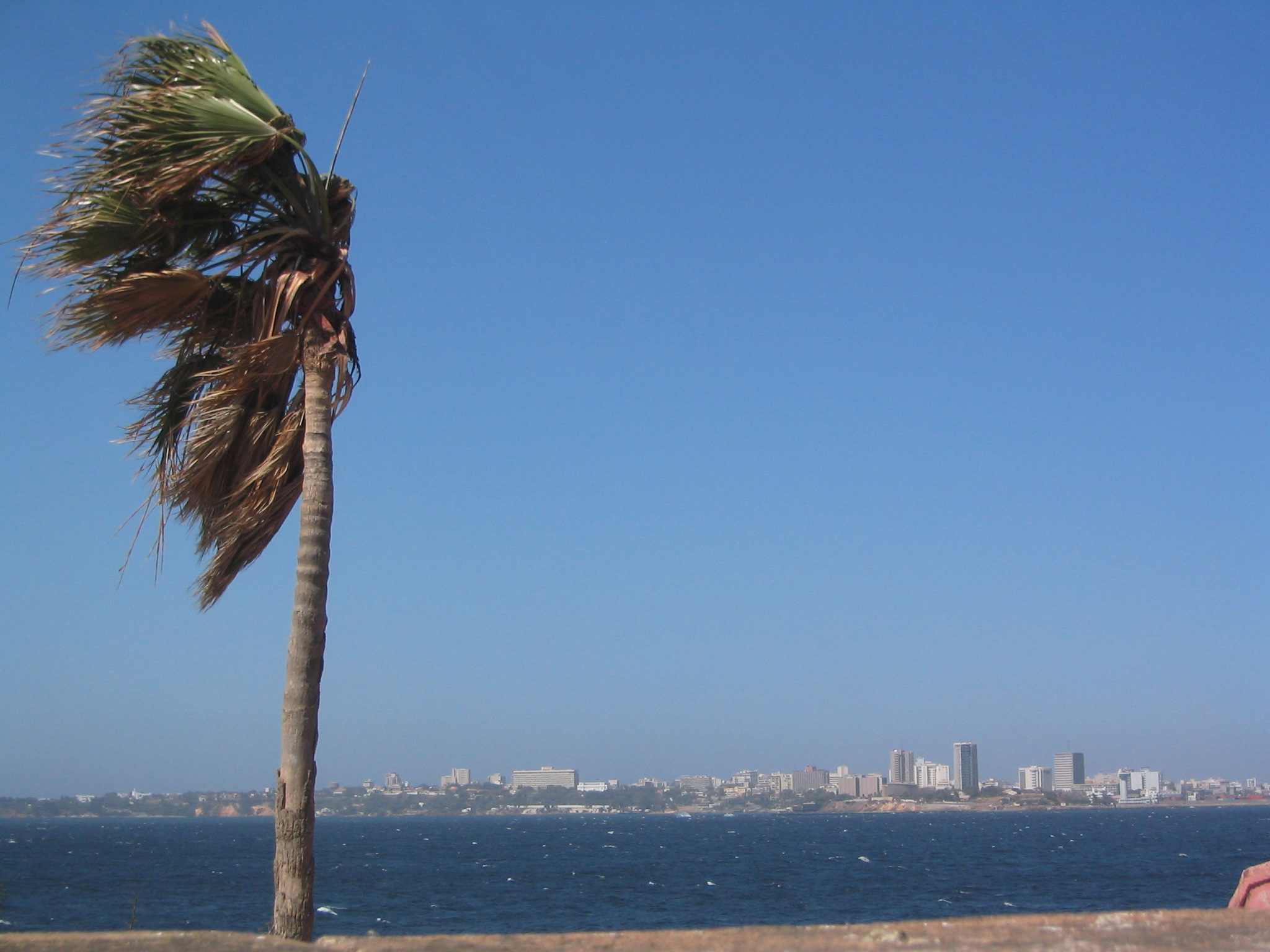

- Dakar-Plateau location
- Country: Senegal
- Region: Dakar Region
- Department: Dakar Department

Area
  - Total: 5 km^{2} (1.9 sq mi)

Population (2013)
  - Total: 34,713
  - Density: 6,900/km^{2} (18,000/sq mi)
- Time zone: UTC+0 (GMT)

Dakar-Plateau is an arrondissement in the Dakar Department, and forms the central district of the city of Dakar.

== Overview ==
Senegalese arrondissements are quite different from the arrondissements of Paris, being merely local administrative structures of the central state, like the Senegalese départements, and are thus more comparable to French departmental arrondissements.

In 1996, a massive reform of the administrative and political divisions of Senegal was voted by the Parliament of Senegal. The commune of Dakar, whose population approached 1 million inhabitants, was deemed too large and too populous to be properly managed by a central municipality, and so on August 30, 1996 Dakar was divided into 19 communes d'arrondissement.

These communes d'arrondissement were given extensive powers, and are very much like regular communes. They have more powers than the arrondissements of Paris, and are more akin to the London boroughs. The commune of Dakar was maintained above these 19 communes d'arrondissement, and it coordinates the activities of the communes d'arrondissement, much as Greater London coordinates the activities of the London boroughs.

There are five communes d'arrondissement in Dakar-Plateau: Plateau/Gorée, Médina, Fass-Gueule Tapée-Colobane, Fann Point-E, and Île de Gorée.

The sous-préfet of the arrondissement is in charge of controlling the activities of the communes d'arrondissement in his arrondissement.

The commune d'arrondissement of Plateau/Gorée (34,626 inhabitants), in the arrondissement of Dakar-Plateau, is the historical heart of the city, and most ministries and public administrations are located there. The densest and most populous commune d'arrondissement in the arrondissement of Dakar-Plateau is Médina (136,697 inhabitants), while the smallest is the commune d'arrondissement of Île de Gorée (1,034 inhabitants).

Since the administrative reforms of 1996, the régions of Senegal, which until then were merely local administrative structures of the central state, have been turned into full-fledged political units, with democratically elected regional councils, and regional presidents. They were given extensive powers, and manage economic development, transportation, or environmental protection issues at the regional level, thus coordinating the actions of the communes below them.

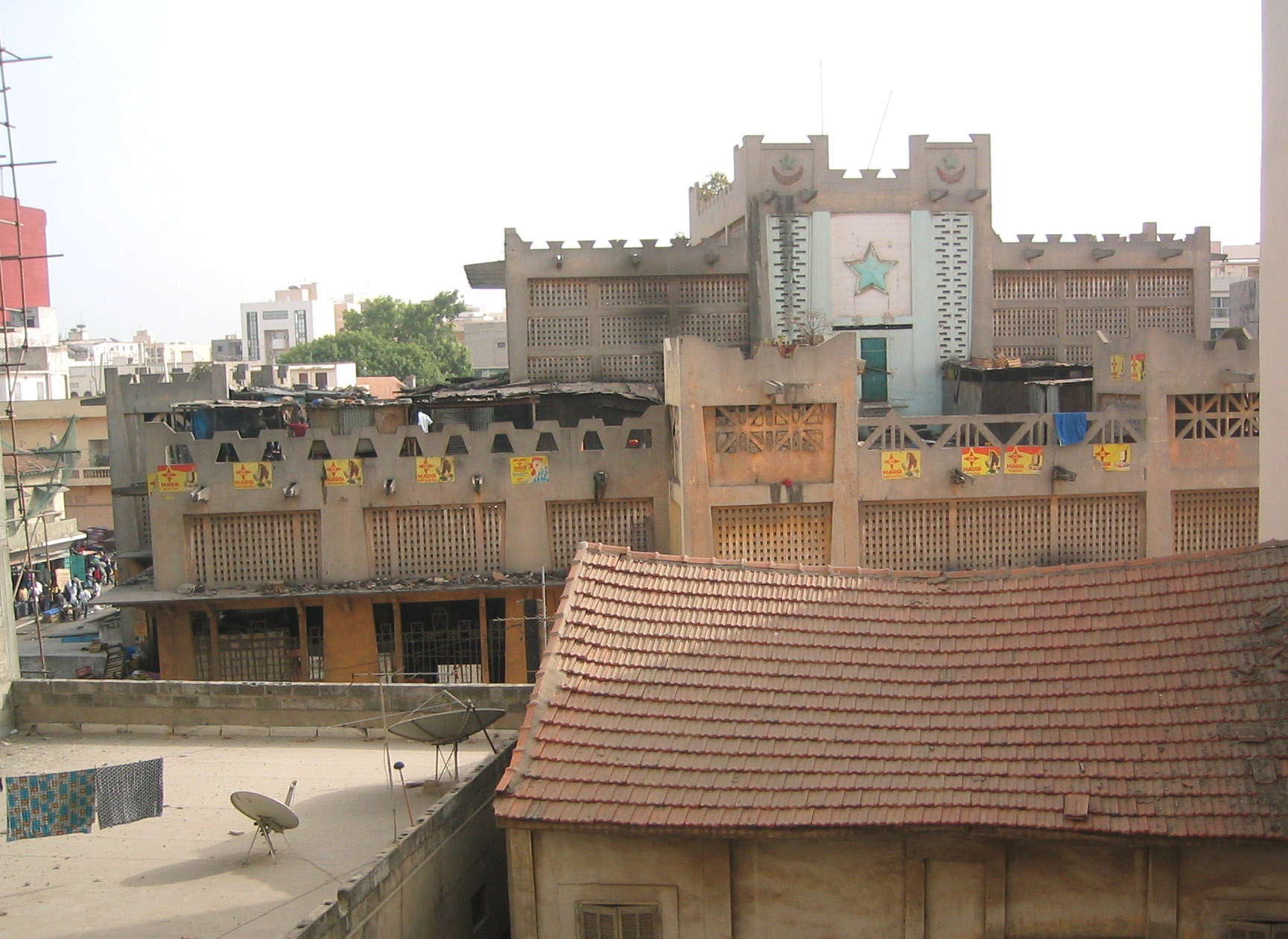

== See also ==
- Arrondissements of Senegal
