= Gueule Tapée-Fass-Colobane =

Coordinates: 14°41′08″N 17°27′11″W

Colobane Gossas
- Commune d'arrondissement
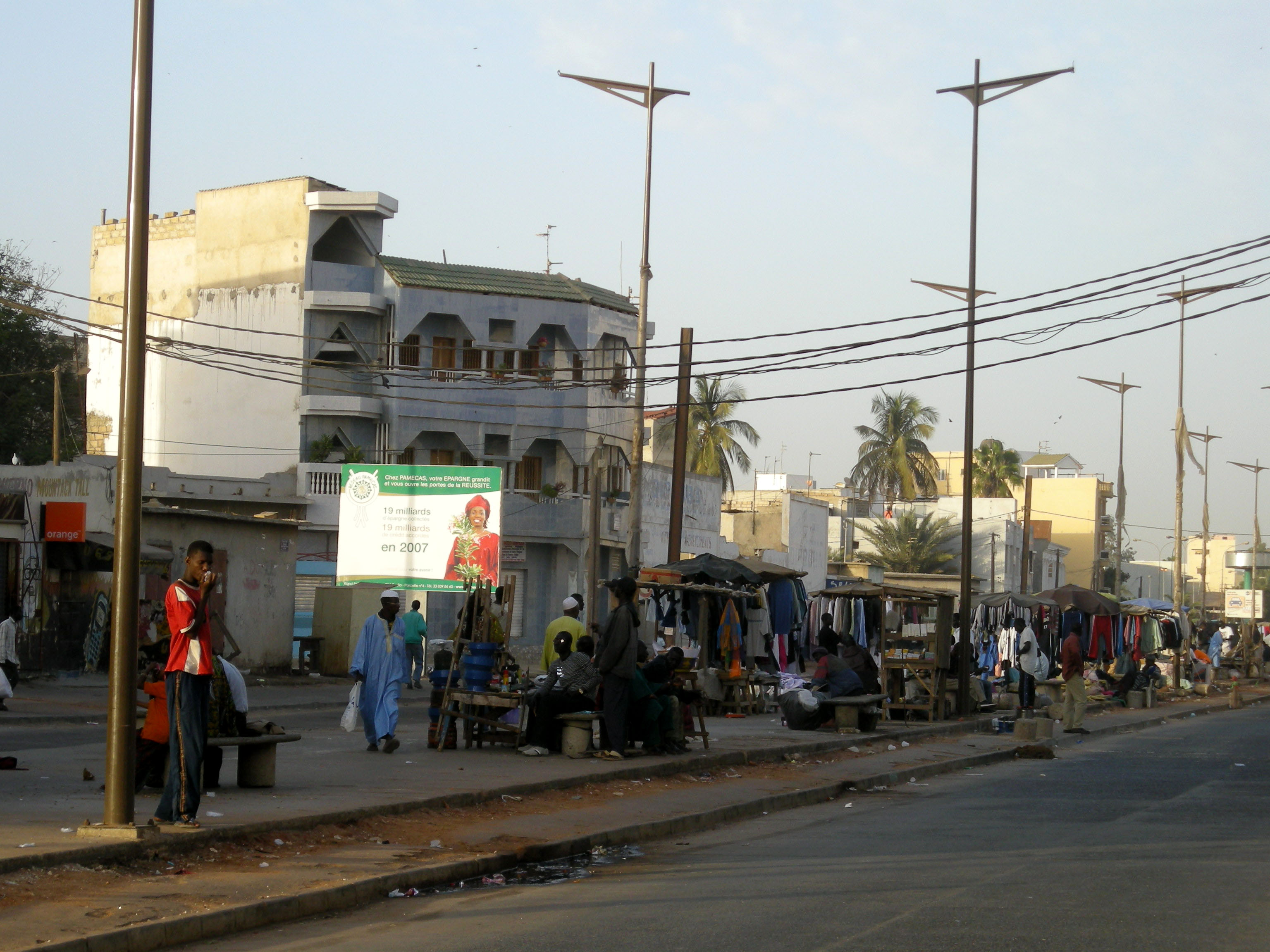

- Gueule Tapée-Fass-Colobane location
- Country: Senegal
- Region: Dakar Region
- Department: Dakar Department

Area
  - Total: 2 km^{2} (0.77 sq mi)

Population (2013)
  - Total: 52,270
  - Density: 26,000/km^{2} (68,000/sq mi)
- Time zone: UTC+0 (GMT)

Gueule Tapée-Fass-Colobane is a commune d'arrondissement of the city of Dakar, Senegal. As of 2013 it had a population of 52,270.

== Notable people ==
- Djibril Diop Mambéty (1945-1998) - film director
