= Ngor, Dakar =

Coordinates: 14°44′37″N 17°30′53″W

Ngor
- Commune d'arrondissement
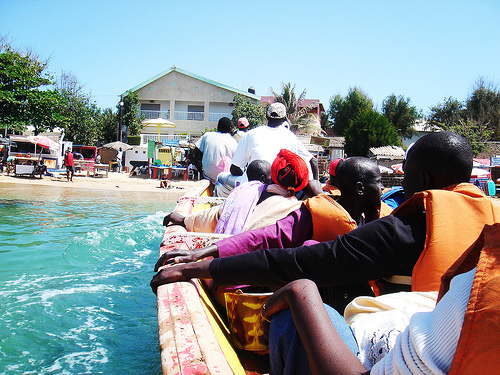

- Location of Ngor within Dakar
- Country: Senegal
- Region: Dakar Region
- Department: Dakar Department

Area
  - Total: 4.5 km^{2} (1.7 sq mi)
- Elevation: 5 m (16 ft)

Population (2013)
  - Total: 17,383
  - Density: 3,900/km^{2} (10,000/sq mi)
- Time zone: UTC+0 (GMT)
- Website: http://sip.sn/ngor/commune.htm

Ngor (or Ngoor meaning "a virile man" in Serer sometimes denoting an honourable man, from the Serer term kor (man)) is a commune d'arrondissement of the city of Dakar, Senegal. As of 2013 it had a population of 17,383. The westernmost point of the country and the mainland African continent is located in Ngor. Ngor is one of the four original Lebou villages of the Cap-Vert Peninsula, along with Yoff, Hann, and Ouakam. It includes the small island of Ngor.

Ngor's recorded history dates back to 1550, when migrants from the interior of Senegal including the Walo, Cayor, Jolof (also as Djolof or Wolof) and Baol came into the Cap-Vert peninsula.

== Sports club ==
The most notable football club is Olympique de Ngor. The club once played at the First Division of Senegal and later Ligue 1 (Premier League) and was relegated in 2016 to Ligue 2 where they currently play. Another club named Almadies who once played in the First Division up to around the 1970s was also based in Ngor.

== Notable people ==
- Diogal Sakho, musician
