= Cours Sainte Marie de Hann =

School in Dakar, Senegal

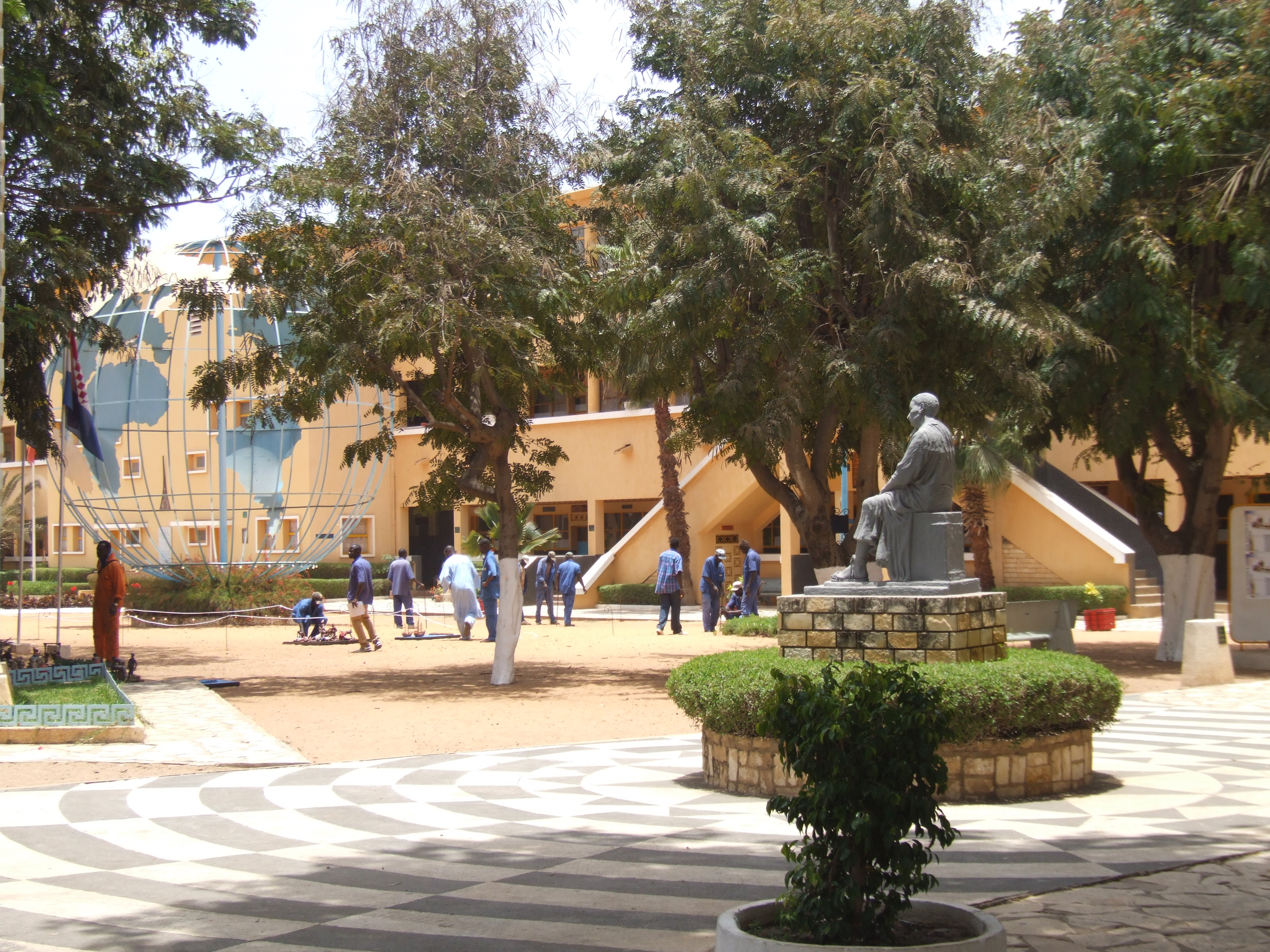

Cours Sainte Marie de Hann is a school for different group of ages ranging from Kindergarten to high school in Dakar, Senegal. It was founded in 1949–1950 and belongs to a group of private schools in the Dakar Diocese of the Catholic Church.

In 1991 it was awarded the UNESCO Prize for Peace Education.
