= HLM (Dakar) =

Coordinates: 14°42′00″N 17°26′44″W

- Commune d'arrondissement
- HLM location
- Country: Senegal
- Region: Dakar Region
- Department: Dakar Department

Area
  - Total: 2 km^{2} (0.77 sq mi)

Population (2013)
  - Total: 39,126
  - Density: 20,000/km^{2} (51,000/sq mi)
- Time zone: UTC+0 (GMT)

HLM is a commune d'arrondissement of the city of Dakar, Senegal. As of 2013 it had a population of 39,126. HLM stands for Habitations à Loyer Modéré (Homes for moderate rents).
