= Rufisque department =

Coordinates: 14.717°N 17.267°W

Rufisque
- Department
- Location in the Dakar Region
- Country: Senegal
- Region: Dakar Region
- Capital: Rufisque

Area
  - Total: 372 km^{2} (144 sq mi)

Population (2023 census)
  - Total: 822,105
  - Density: 2,210/km^{2} (5,720/sq mi)
- Time zone: UTC+0 (GMT)

Rufisque department is one of the 46 departments of Senegal and one of the four which make up the Dakar region.

There are six urban communes within the department: Bargny, Sébikotane, Diamniadio, Jaxaay-Parcelle-Niakoul Rap, Sangalkam and Sendou. The rest of the department is divided into two arrondissements.

- Rufisque Arrondissement is subdivided into three communes de arrondissement: Rufisque Est, Rufisque Nord and Rufisque Ouest.
- Bambylor Arrondissement is subdivided into three rural districts (communautés rurales);
  - Yéne
  - Bambylor
  - Tivaouane Peulh-Niaga

== Historic sites ==
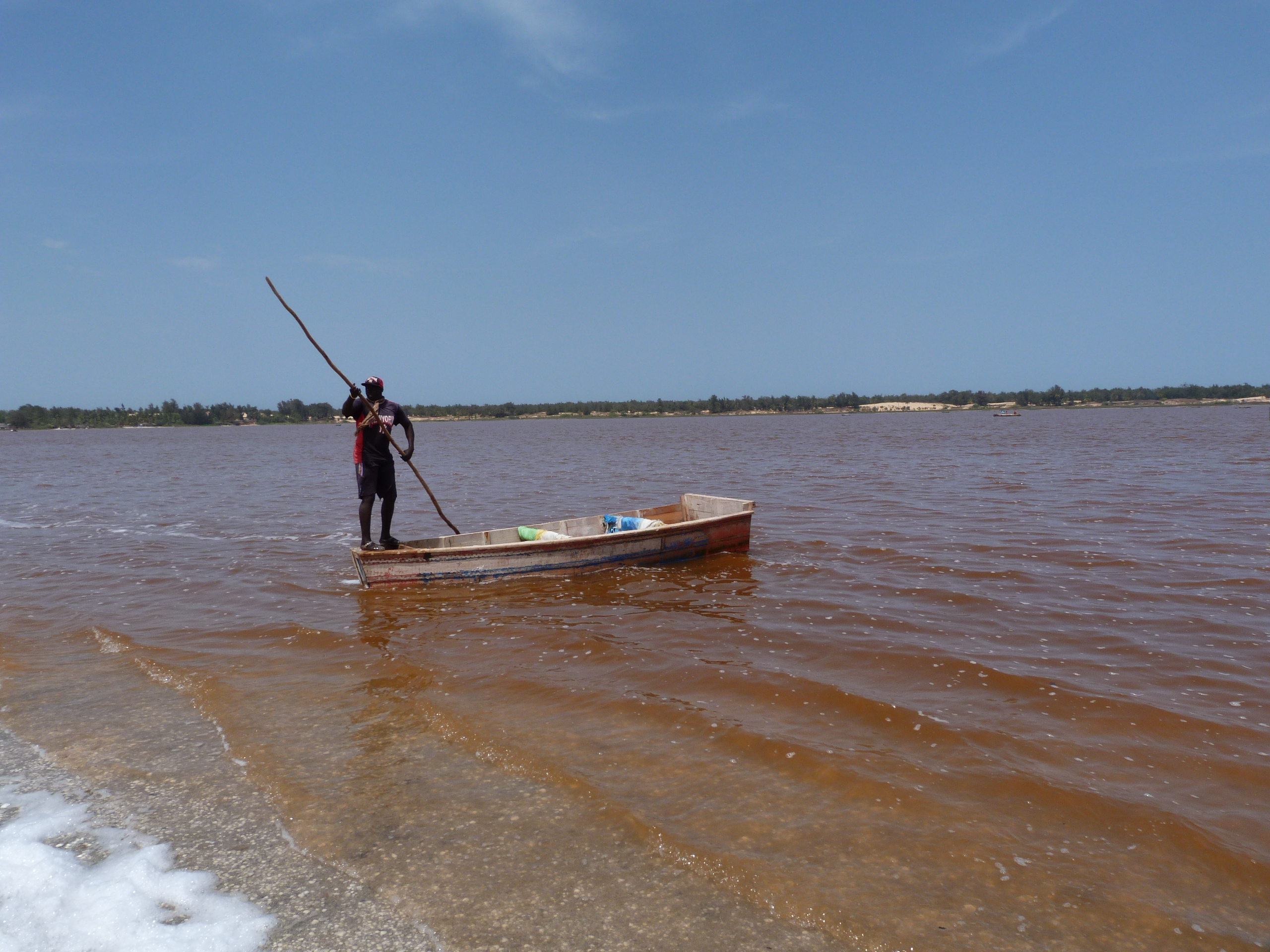
The Rose Lake

- The historic centre or Old Rufisque, lying between the East Canal, the West Canal, the railway line and the seafront.
- National printworks
- Former William Ponty school at Sébikotane
- Ancient dunes at Kounoune, Neolithic site
- Lake Retba, The Rose Lake or Pink Lake (coloured pink by algae)
