= Parcelles Assainies =

Coordinates: 14°45′25″N 17°26′05″W

- Commune d'arrondissement
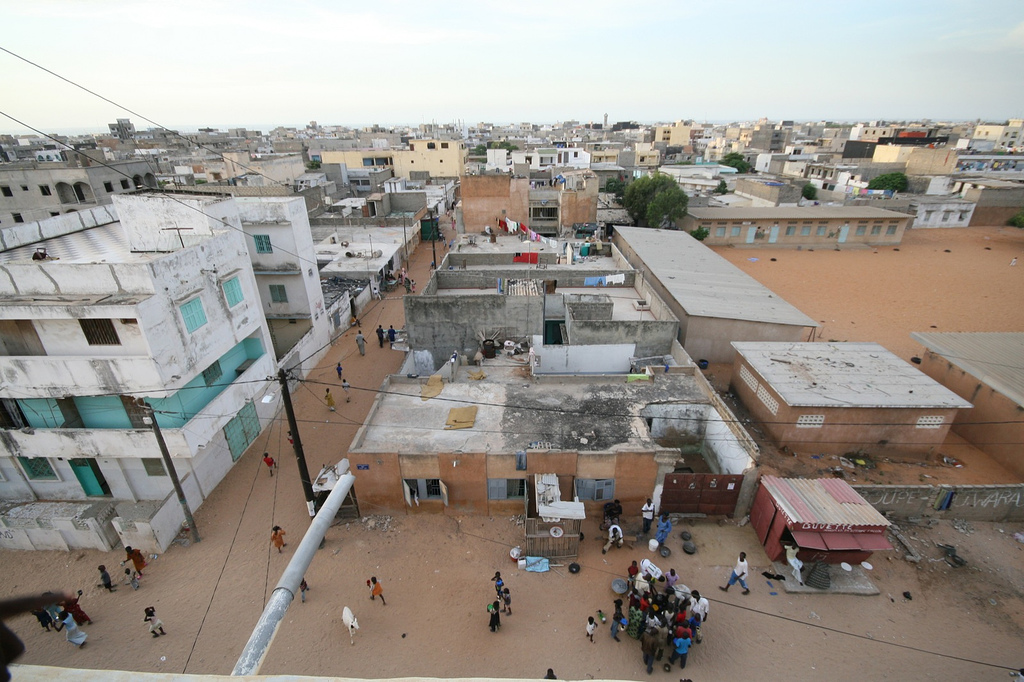

- Parcelles Assainies location
- Country: Senegal
- Region: Dakar Region
- Department: Dakar Department

Area
  - Total: 4 km^{2} (1.5 sq mi)

Population (2013)
  - Total: 159,498
  - Density: 40,000/km^{2} (100,000/sq mi)
- Time zone: UTC+0 (GMT)

Parcelles Assainies is a commune d'arrondissement of the city of Dakar, Senegal. As of 2013 it had a population of 159,498.

== See also ==
- Wolof
