= Médina, Dakar =

Coordinates: 14°41′06″N 17°26′58″W

Médina
- Commune d'arrondissement
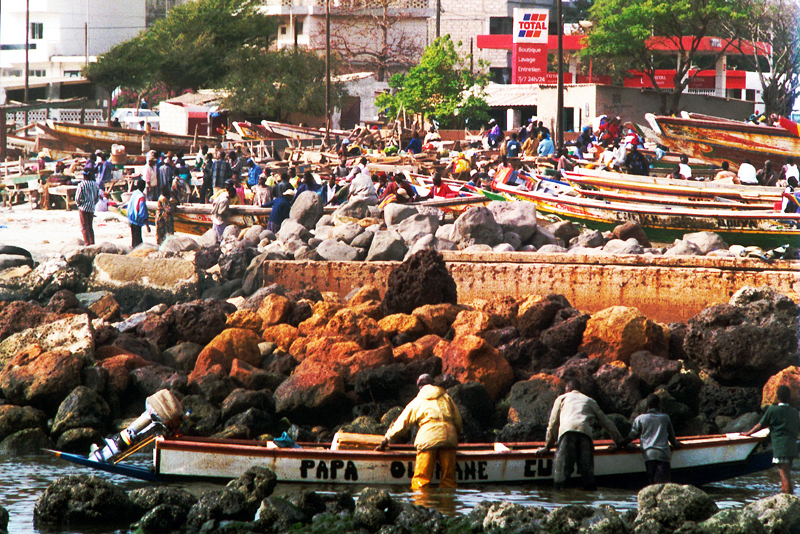
- The market of Soumbedioun

- Medina location
- Country: Senegal
- Region: Dakar Region
- Department: Dakar Department

Area
  - Total: 2 km^{2} (0.77 sq mi)

Population (2013)
  - Total: 81,982
  - Density: 41,000/km^{2} (110,000/sq mi)
- Time zone: UTC+0 (GMT)

Médina is a commune d'arrondissement of the city of Dakar, Senegal, part of the Dakar-Plateau arrondissement, located in the southern part of Dakar.

== Overview ==
Médina stands out as one of the oldest and most populous neighborhoods in Dakar, maintaining its original African character in contrast to the modern districts of the Plateau. Consequently, it also serves as a cultural hub of the city. A number of notable Senegalese people, including the world-famous singer Youssou N'Dour and Omar Pene (another influential singer and musician) were born in Médina.

Médina also houses some of the prominent landmarks of Dakar, including the Grand Mosque and the Soumbédioune market, one of the major street markets of Dakar, which is also a prominent tourist attraction.

== History ==
The commune of Médina was established by the French colonial authorities in 1914. The explicit intent of the establishment of Médina was that of creating a "native quarter" for the African population, clearly separated from the urban areas inhabited by the Europeans, especially for health-related reasons.
