= Dieuppeul-Derklé =

Coordinates: 14°43′01″N 17°27′00″W

- Commune d'arrondissement
- Dieuppeul-Derklé location
- Country: Senegal
- Region: Dakar Region
- Department: Dakar Department

Area
  - Total: 1 km^{2} (0.39 sq mi)

Population (2013)
  - Total: 36,917
  - Density: 37,000/km^{2} (96,000/sq mi)
- Time zone: UTC+0 (GMT)

Dieuppeul-Derklé is a commune d'arrondissement of the city of Dakar, Senegal. As of 2013 it had a population of 36,917.
