= Grand Dakar =

Coordinates: 14°42′15″N 17°27′12″W

- Commune d'arrondissement
- Grand-Dakar location
- Country: Senegal
- Region: Dakar Region
- Department: Dakar Department

Area
  - Total: 1 km^{2} (0.39 sq mi)

Population (2013)
  - Total: 47,012
  - Density: 47,000/km^{2} (120,000/sq mi)
- Time zone: UTC+0 (GMT)

Grand Dakar is a commune d'arrondissement of the city of Dakar, Senegal.
