= Sicap-Liberté =

Coordinates: 14°42′N 17°27′W

- Commune d'arrondissement
- Sicap-Liberté location
- Country: Senegal
- Region: Dakar Region
- Department: Dakar Department

Area
  - Total: 2 km^{2} (0.77 sq mi)

Population (2007)
  - Total: 47,164
  - Density: 24,000/km^{2} (61,000/sq mi)
- Time zone: UTC+0 (GMT)

Sicap-Liberté is a commune d'arrondissement of the city of Dakar, Senegal. As of 2013 it had a population of 47,164.
