= Cambérène =

Coordinates: 14°46′15″N 17°25′51″W

Cambérène =
- Commune d'arrondissement
- Cambérène location
- Country: Senegal
- Region: Dakar Region
- Department: Dakar Department

Area
  - Total: 2 km^{2} (0.77 sq mi)

Population (2013)
  - Total: 52,420
  - Density: 26,000/km^{2} (68,000/sq mi)
- Time zone: UTC+0 (GMT)

Cambérène is a commune d'arrondissement of the city of Dakar, Senegal. As of 2013 it had a population of 52,420.
