= Lebu people =

Ethnic group in western Senegal

The Lebu (or Lebou or Lébou) are an ethnic group of Senegal, West Africa, living on the peninsula of Cap-Vert, site of Dakar. The Lebu are primarily a fishing community, but they have a substantial business in construction supplies and real estate. They speak Lebu Wolof, which is closely related to Wolof proper but is not intelligible with it.

== Culture ==
The Lebu political and spiritual capital is at Layene, situated in the Yoff neighborhood of northern Dakar. The largely Lebu religious sect and theocracy, the Layene, is headquartered there. In addition to Yoff, other Lebu centres are nearby Ouakam, Cambérène and Ngor.

Lebu society emphasizes piety and respect for elders. Lebu families include not only living people but also associated ancestral spirits. The Lebu are noted for their public exorcism dances and rituals, often attended by tourists. Most Lebu are adherents of Islam. Although their adherence to Islam is not homogeneous, a small segment of the population adheres to the Layene sect, while an overwhelming majority either follows another Sufi branch or is not affiliated with any Sufi practice.

== History ==
The Lebu identity, separate from neighboring Wolof and Serer communities, goes back at least as far as the early 15th century, before European explorers arrived in the area. The traditional date of the founding of Yoff is 1430.

Lebu traditions place their origins, like those of the Wolof and Serer, north of the Senegal River, which is a frequent debate that sparks regarding the Lebu. There were Lebu at Lake Guiers by the 16th century, and by 1700 they had moved into the Cap Vert peninsula, expelling a few Mandinka tribes already there. At the time the area was ruled by the Damel of Cayor.

In 1776, a marabout rebellion broke out in Cayor. When it was crushed, some of the defeated Muslims took refuge among the Lebou. In 1790, despite the fact that most Lebous remained animist, Dial Diop led these marabouts to declare independence. After 20 years of war, in 1812, Cayor finally recognized their independence and Diop was proclaimed serigne (spiritual leader) of the community. This 'Lebou Theocratic Republic' retains special legal autonomy to the present day.

Within the 'Lebou Republic', authority is vested in two assemblies: Diambouri Ndakarou and Diambouri Pintch, the assembly of Dakar and of the neighborhoods respectively. The neighborhood chiefs select the serigne from one of the Lebou aristocratic families, and he serves as a court of last resort. They also choose the diaraf, whose duty is to settle land and inheritance disputes. The Ndeyedy Rew serves as a sort of minister of interior and foreign affairs. Historically, he has managed relations with the French and served as the spokesperson for the community.

== Related people ==
- Serer people
- Wolof people
