= Grand Yoff =

Coordinates: 14°44′01″N 17°26′58″W

- Commune d'arrondissement
- Grand Yoff location
- Country: Senegal
- Region: Dakar Region
- Department: Dakar Department

Area
  - Total: 6 km^{2} (2.3 sq mi)

Population (2013)
  - Total: 185,503
  - Density: 31,000/km^{2} (80,000/sq mi)
- Time zone: UTC+0 (GMT)

Grand Yoff is a commune d'arrondissement of the city of Dakar, Senegal. As of 2013 it had a population of 185,503. It is composed of 66 sub-districts, each represented by a district delegate. Grand Yoff is part of the Parcelles Assainies district. The neighborhood of Grand Yoff is the most populated neighborhood in Dakar, and the 7th most populated in Senegal.

== Population ==
The population of Grand Yoff is growing rapidly. In 2002, it was estimated that there were about 128,740 inhabitants. Since then, the neighborhood increased to about 144,859 inhabitants in 2007 and to approximately 185,503 in 2013. There is some debate surrounding the total number of people living in Grand Yoff, as some believe the figures represent less than the actual number of people who live in this neighborhood. Each of the ethnic groups in Senegal are represented in this neighborhood.

Despite its growing population, Grand Yoff occupies an area of only 6.3 km2. The limited space has led to an overcrowding of the area. On average, there are about 29,000 inhabitants per km2 in Grand Yoff, about 50% more than the Paris Commune and about 7% more than in Manhattan, New York. The high population density has led to many difficulties such as street congestion, land disputes, and conflicts of occupation.

== Infrastructure ==
Grand Yoff has a road network with only one third being paved (46 km). The remaining 110 km of road is unpaved and mostly made of sand. Like most of Dakar, the interior of Grand Yoff is made up of small streets of sand while the main roads are paved. Sometimes, the smaller streets are difficult to reach by car due to informal trade encroaching on the roads. Despite portions of paved roads that are partially degraded by potholes, the paved roads are in relatively good shape.

== Issues and challenges ==
There are many challenges facing the neighborhood of Grand Yoff. The high population density has led to a number of difficulties such as street congestion, land disputes, and conflicts of occupation. When confronted with massive influxes of inhabitants, these problems tend to worsen. Recurring flooding during the rainy seasons also pose a serious problems to the inhabitants in this neighborhood as it complicates the lives of those who live in the affected areas. There are also problems of insecurity, lack of health and education infrastructure, and unemployment, especially among the younger generation.
