= Fann-Point E-Amitié =

Coordinates: 14°41′33″N 17°28′02″W

- Commune d'arrondissement
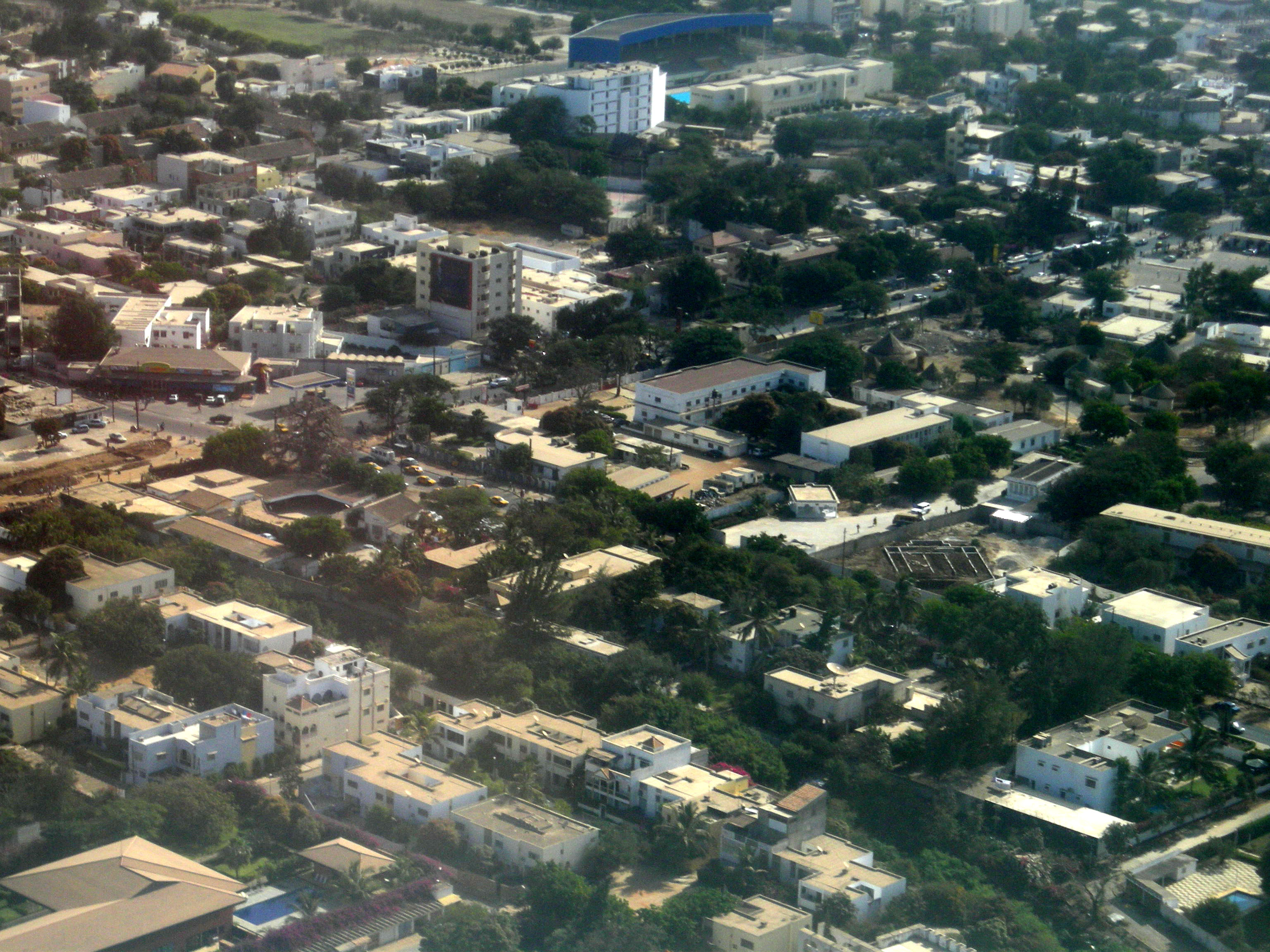

- Fann-Point E-Amitié location
- Country: Senegal
- Region: Dakar Region
- Department: Dakar Department

Area
  - Total: 5 km^{2} (1.9 sq mi)

Population (2013)
  - Total: 18,841
  - Density: 3,800/km^{2} (9,800/sq mi)
- Time zone: UTC+0 (GMT)

Fann-Point E-Amitié is a commune d'arrondissement of the city of Dakar, Senegal. It is located on the southwestern coast of the Cap-Vert peninsula. As of 2013, it had a population of 18,841.
