= Dakar department =

Coordinates: 14°42′N 17°27′W

Dakar
- Department
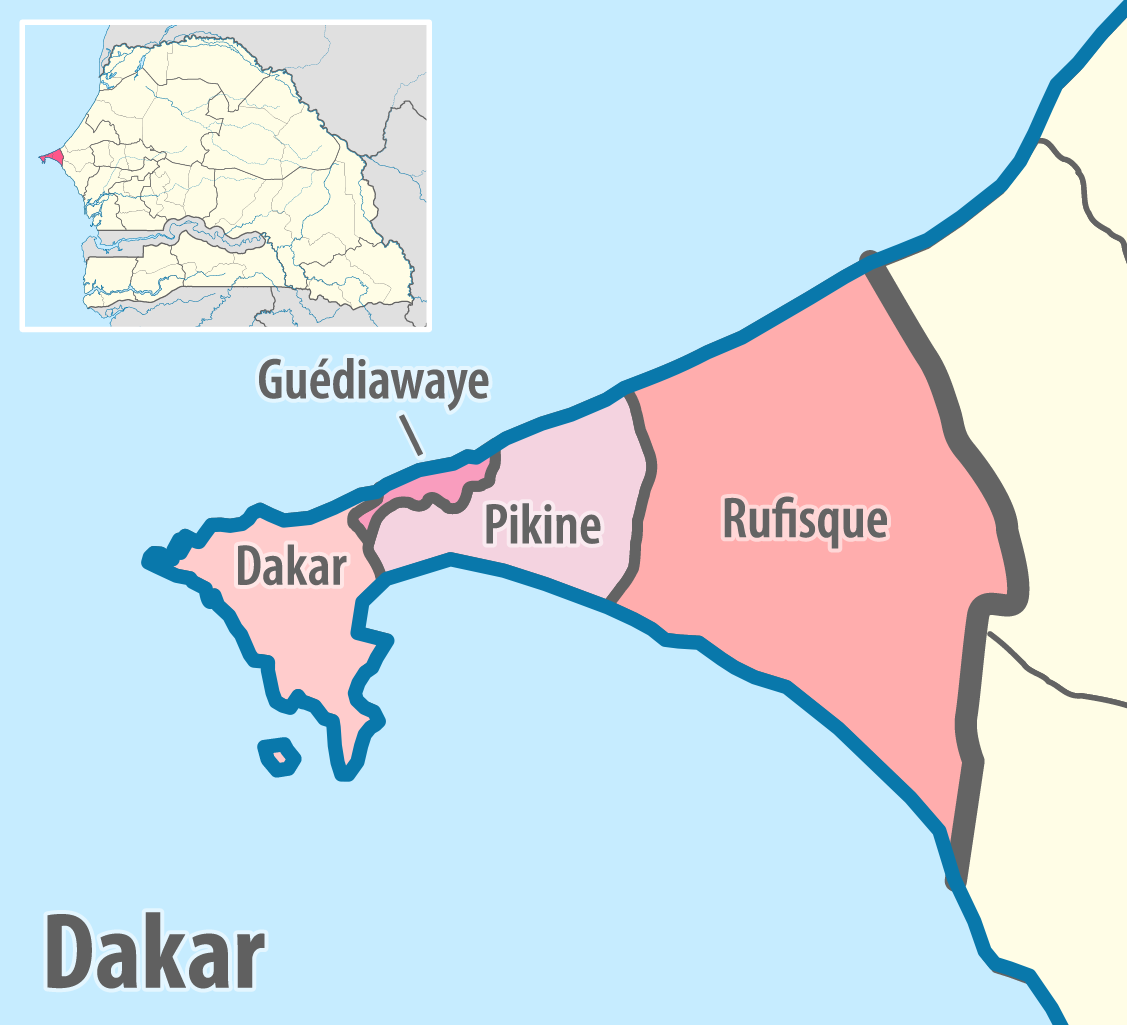
- Location in the Dakar Region
- Country: Senegal
- Region: Dakar Region
- Capital: Dakar

Area
  - Total: 79 km^{2} (31 sq mi)

Population (2023 census)
  - Total: 1,278,469
  - Density: 16,000/km^{2} (42,000/sq mi)
- Time zone: UTC+0 (GMT)

Dakar department is one of the departments of Senegal, located in the Dakar region.

The department of Dakar is one of the four departments of the Dakar region, which is one of the 14 regions of Senegal. The Dakar region encompasses the city of Dakar and all its suburbs along the Cape Verde Peninsula. Its territory is thus roughly the same as the territory of the metropolitan area of Dakar. Since the administrative reforms of 1996, the regions of Senegal, which until then were merely local administrative structures of the central state, have been turned into full-fledged political units, with democratically elected regional councils, and regional presidents. They were given extensive powers, and manage economic development, transportation, or environmental protection issues at the regional level, thus coordinating the actions of the communes below them.

The department of Dakar is divided into four arrondissements: Almadies, Grand Dakar, Parcelles Assainies (which literally means "drained lots"; this is the most populous arrondissement of Dakar), and Plateau/Gorée (downtown Dakar). These arrondissements are quite different from the arrondissements of Paris, being merely local administrative structures of the central state, like the Senegalese departments, and are thus more comparable to French departmental arrondissements.

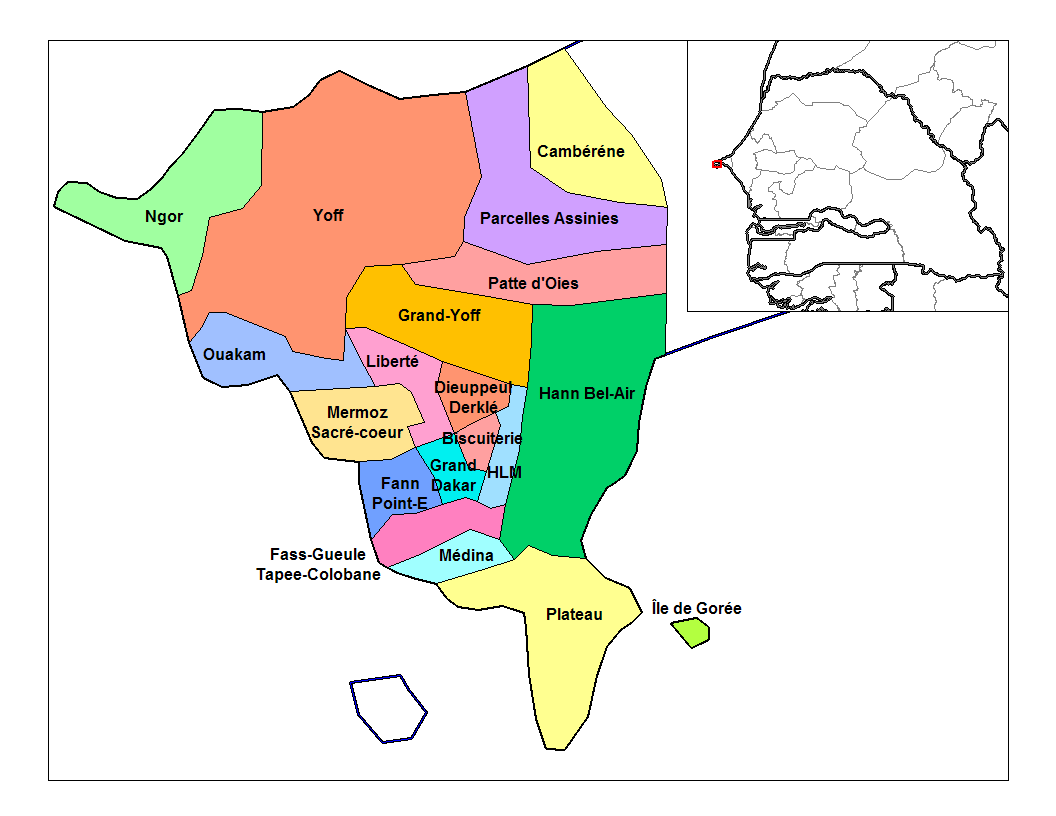
Map

In 1996, a massive reform of the administrative and political divisions of Senegal was voted by the Parliament of Senegal. The commune of Dakar, whose population approached 1 million inhabitants, was deemed too large and too populated to be properly managed by a central municipality. As such, on August 30, 1996, Dakar was divided into 19 communes d'arrondissement.

These communes d'arrondissement were given extensive powers, and are very much like regular communes. They have more powers than the arrondissements of Paris, and are more akin to the London boroughs. The commune of Dakar was maintained above these 19 communes d'arrondissement, and it coordinates the activities of the communes d'arrondissement, much as Greater London coordinates the activities of the London boroughs.

The 19 communes d'arrondissement belong to either of the four arrondissements of Dakar, and the sous-préfet of each arrondissement is in charge of controlling the activities of the communes d'arrondissement in his arrondissement.

Dakar Department includes the commune d'arrondissement of Dakar-Plateau (34,626 inhabitants), in the arrondissement of Plateau/Gorée, is the historical heart of the city, and most ministries and public administrations are located there. The densest and most populous commune d'arrondissement is Médina (136,697 inhabitants), in the arrondissement of Plateau/Gorée. The smallest one is the commune d'arrondissement of Île de Gorée (1,034 inhabitants), in the arrondissement of Plateau/Gorée.

== Table of Administrative Sub-divisions ==
Administrative Divisions of the Dakar Region
Département	Commune	Arrondissement	Commune d'arrondissement	Population (2013)
Department/ County / State	City	Borough	Neighborhood	
Dakar	Dakar	Almadies	Mermoz-Sacré-Cœur	29,798
Dakar	Dakar	Almadies	Ngor	17,383
Dakar	Dakar	Almadies	Ouakam	74,692
Dakar	Dakar	Almadies	Yoff	89,442
Dakar	Dakar	Dakar Plateau	Fann-Point E-Amitié	18,841
Dakar	Dakar	Dakar Plateau	Gorée	1,680
Dakar	Dakar	Dakar Plateau	Gueule Tapée-Fass-Colobane	52,270
Dakar	Dakar	Dakar Plateau	Médina	81,982
Dakar	Dakar	Dakar Plateau	Plateau	34,713
Dakar	Dakar	Grand Dakar	Biscuiterie	68,547
Dakar	Dakar	Grand Dakar	Dieuppeul-Derklé	36,917
Dakar	Dakar	Grand Dakar	Grand Dakar	47,012
Dakar	Dakar	Grand Dakar	Hann-Bel Air	67,962
Dakar	Dakar	Grand Dakar	HLM	39,126
Dakar	Dakar	Grand Dakar	Sicap-Liberté	47,164
Dakar	Dakar	Parcelles Assainies	Cambérène	52,420
Dakar	Dakar	Parcelles Assainies	Grand Yoff	185,503
Dakar	Dakar	Parcelles Assainies	Parcelles Assainies	159,498
Dakar	Dakar	Parcelles Assainies	Patte d'Oie	41,106
