= Patte d'oie =

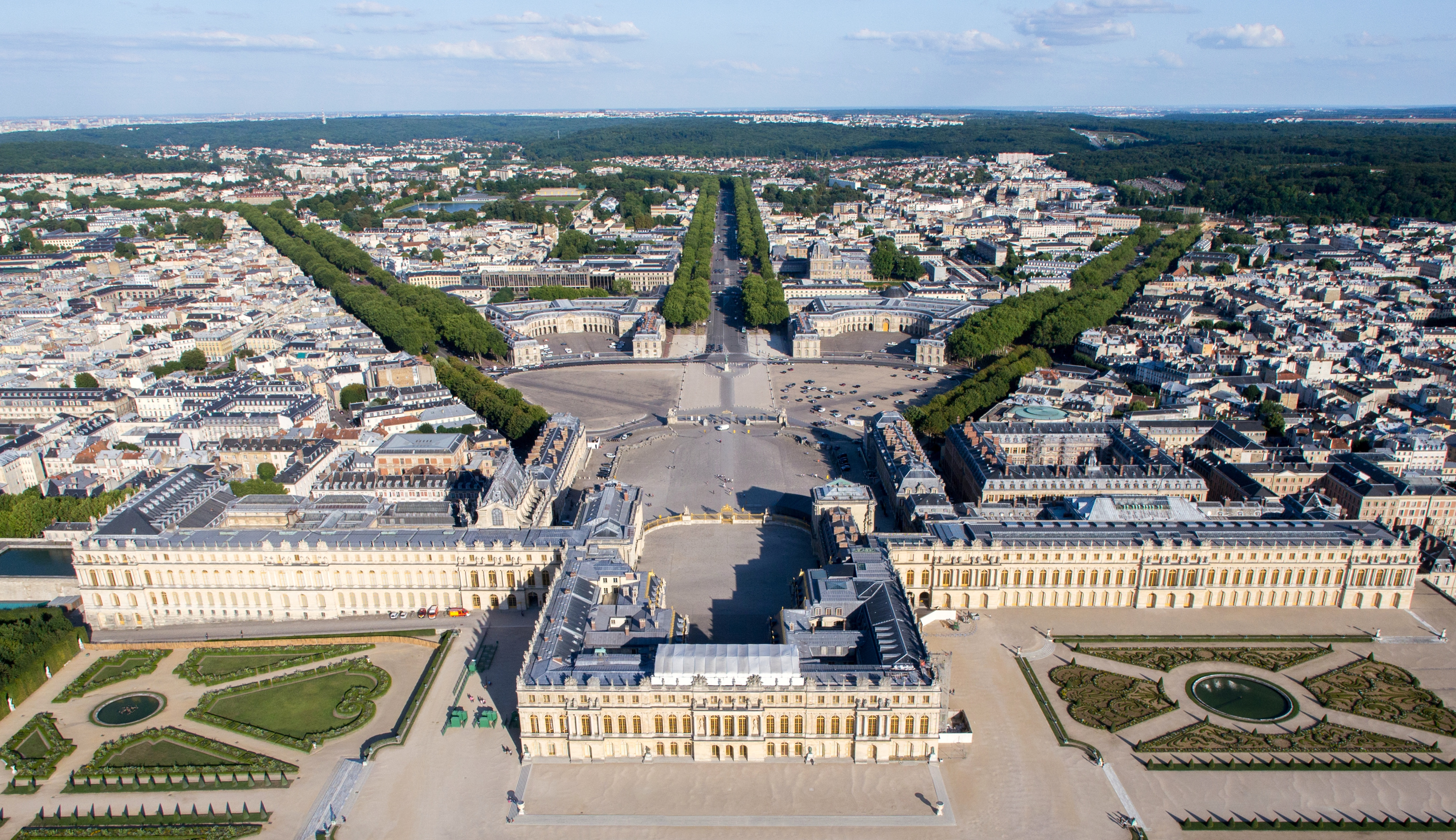
Aerial view of the famous patte d'oie at the entrance to the Château de Versailles

The French term patte d'oie (literally "goose foot", in English sometimes referred to as a "crow's foot") describes a design whereby three, four, or five or more straight roads or paths radiate out from a central point, so called from its resemblance to a goose's foot.

The first use of the term dates from 1624, and the design became common in French gardens and English gardens of the late 17th century. Typically it focused on the entrance front of a house, and the road on its central axis continued as the entrance drive. The idea for the patte d'oie may have originated in town planning schemes where roads converged onto a single space or feature, such as the Piazza del Popolo in Rome.

It is often a feature of site plans for the grander French châteaux of the 17th and 18th centuries, in which the roads converge on an important element of the central axis. Examples include the Château de Richelieu (c. 1639), the Château de Vaux-le-Vicomte (c. 1660), and the Château de Versailles (c. 1664). The château of Richelieu had three roads converging on a 300-ft. circle directly in front of the entrance gate. Vaux and Versailles each had designs for two pattes d'oie, one focused on the entrance forecourt, and the other, on a far part of the garden.

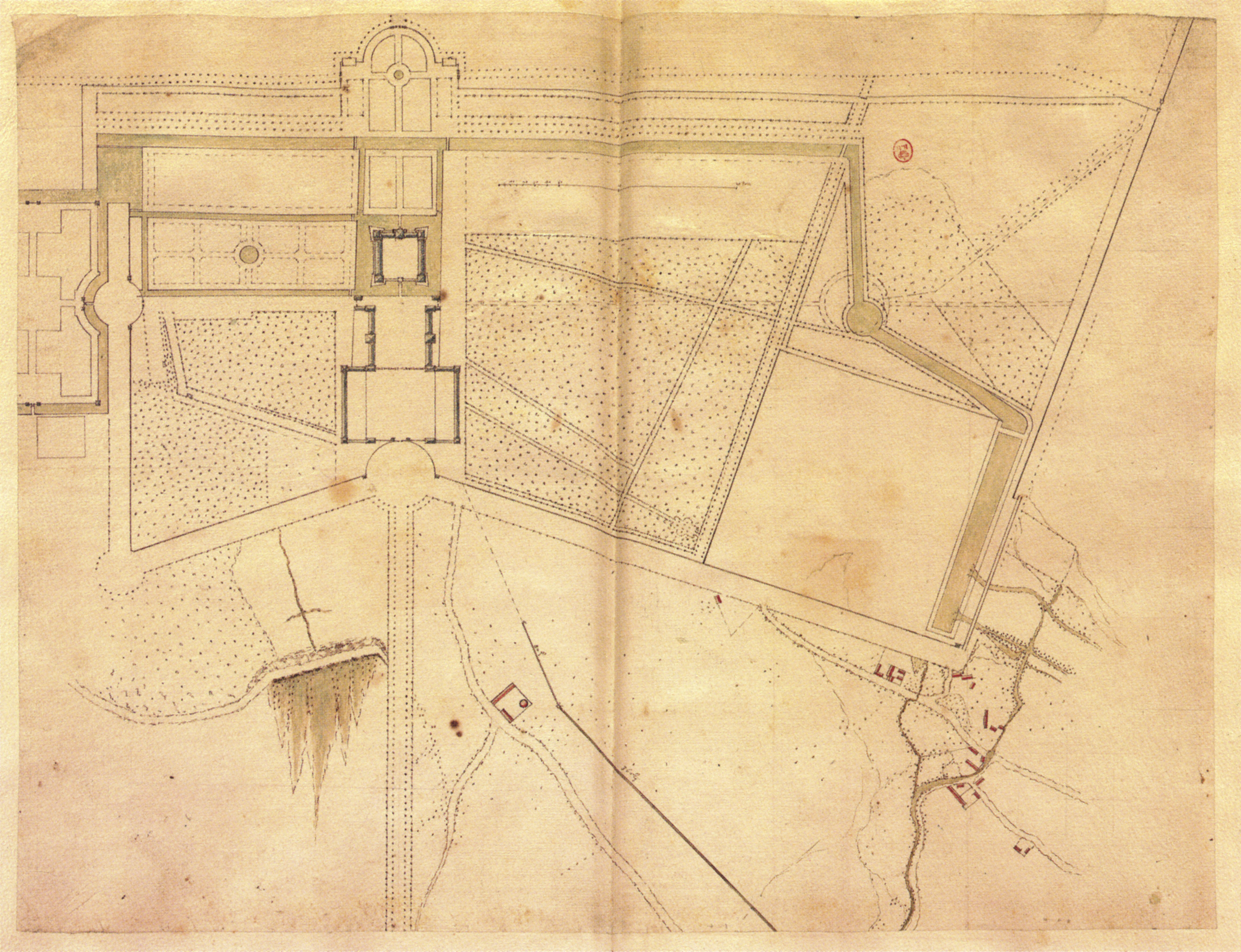
Site plan for the Château de Richelieu (c. 1639), drawing by Jacques Lemercier

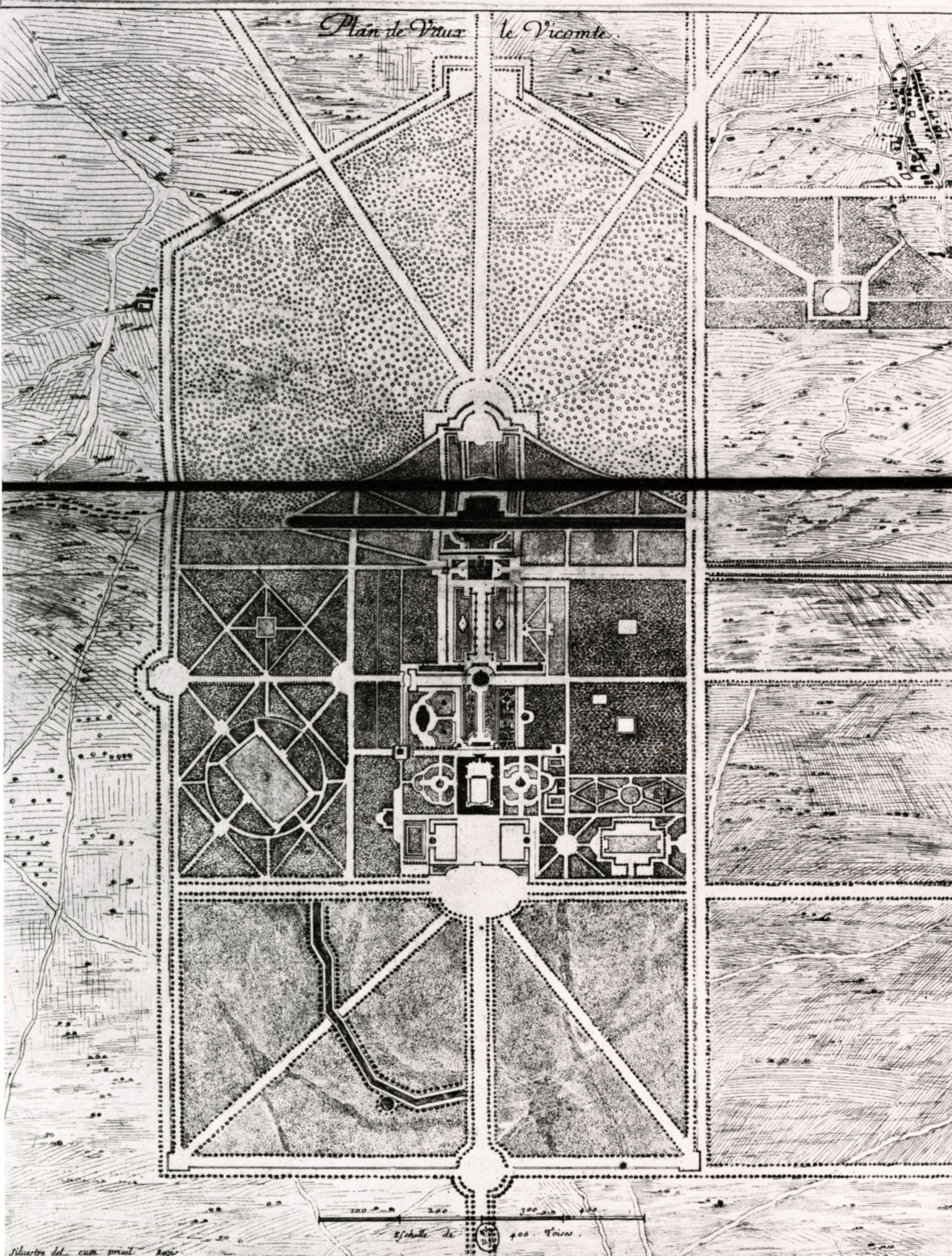
Site plan for the Château de Vaux-le-Vicomte (c. 1660), designed by André Le Nôtre, engraved by Israel Silvestre

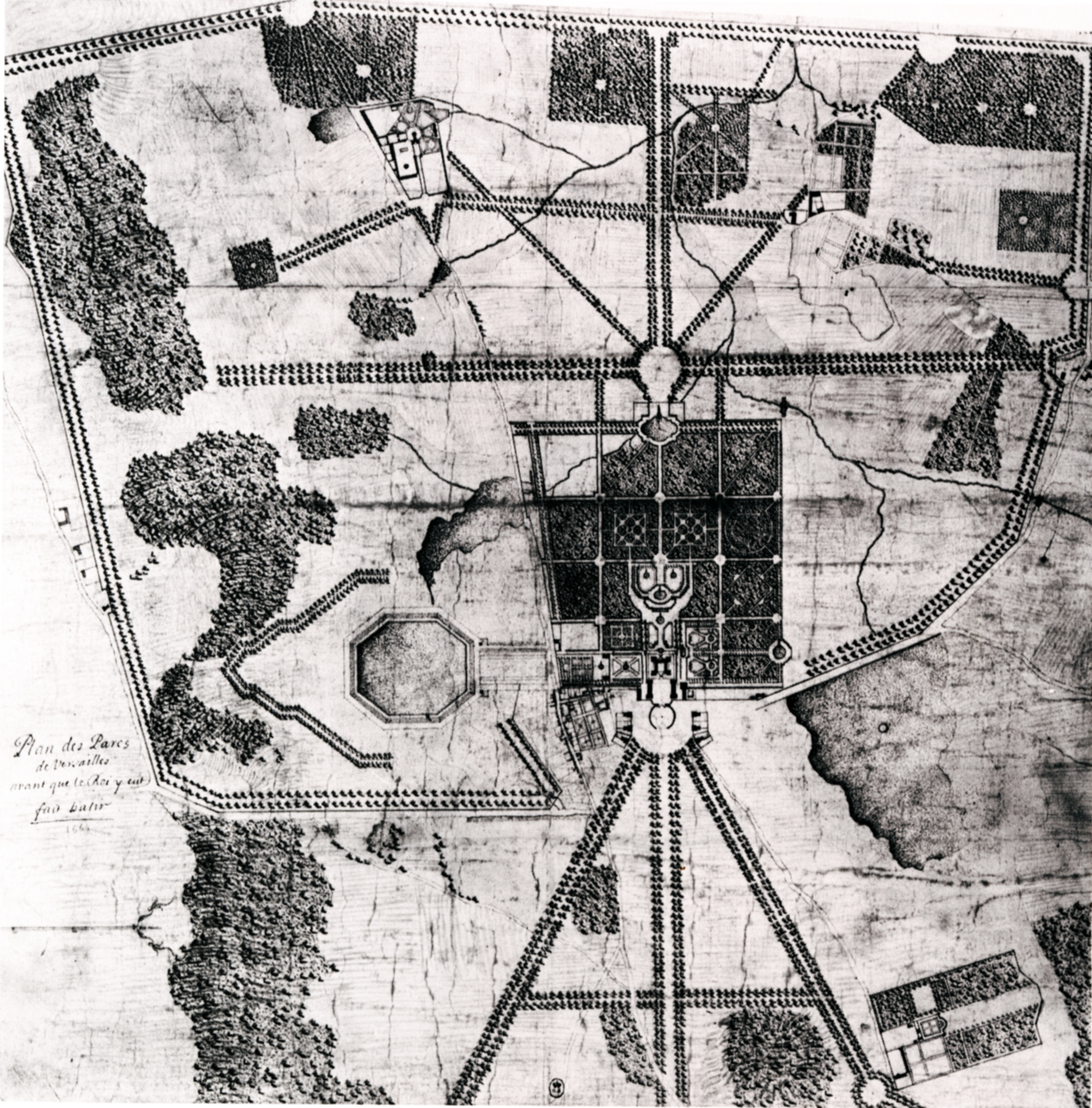
Site plan for the Château de Versailles (c. 1664–1665), designed by Le Nôtre

== Bibliography ==
- Adams, William Howard (1979). The French Garden 1500–1800. New York: George Brazilier. ISBN 9780807609187.
- Boïelle, James (1903). Heath's French and English Dictionary. Boston: D. C. Heath. Copy at Google Books.
- Curl, James Stevens (2006). Oxford Dictionary of Architecture and Landscape Architecture, 2nd edition. Oxford and New York: Oxford University Press. ISBN 9780198606789.
- Hazlehurst, F. Hamilton (1980). Gardens of Illusion: The Genius of André Le Nostre. Nashville, Tennessee: Vanderbilt University Press. ISBN 9780826512093.
- Taylor, Patrick (2006). The Oxford Companion to the Garden. Oxford University Press. ISBN 9780815192268.
