= Dakar region =

Region of Senegal

Dakar region Région de Dakar (French) Diiwaanu Ndakaaru (Wolof)
- Region
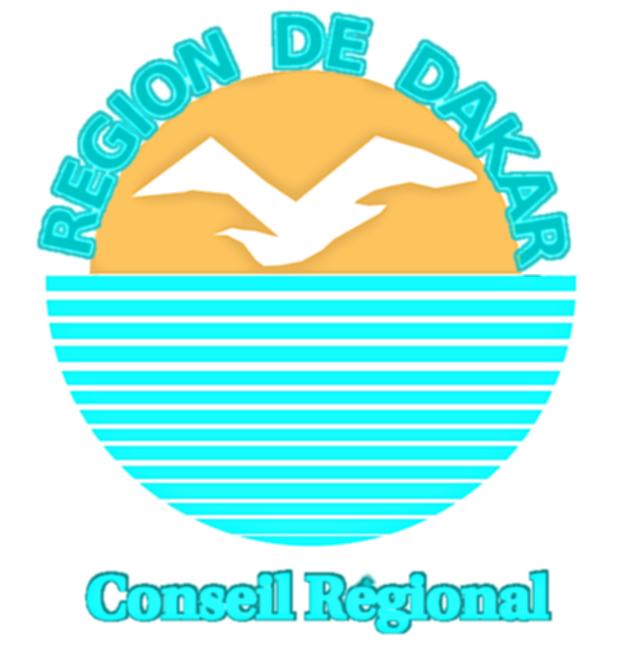
- Seal

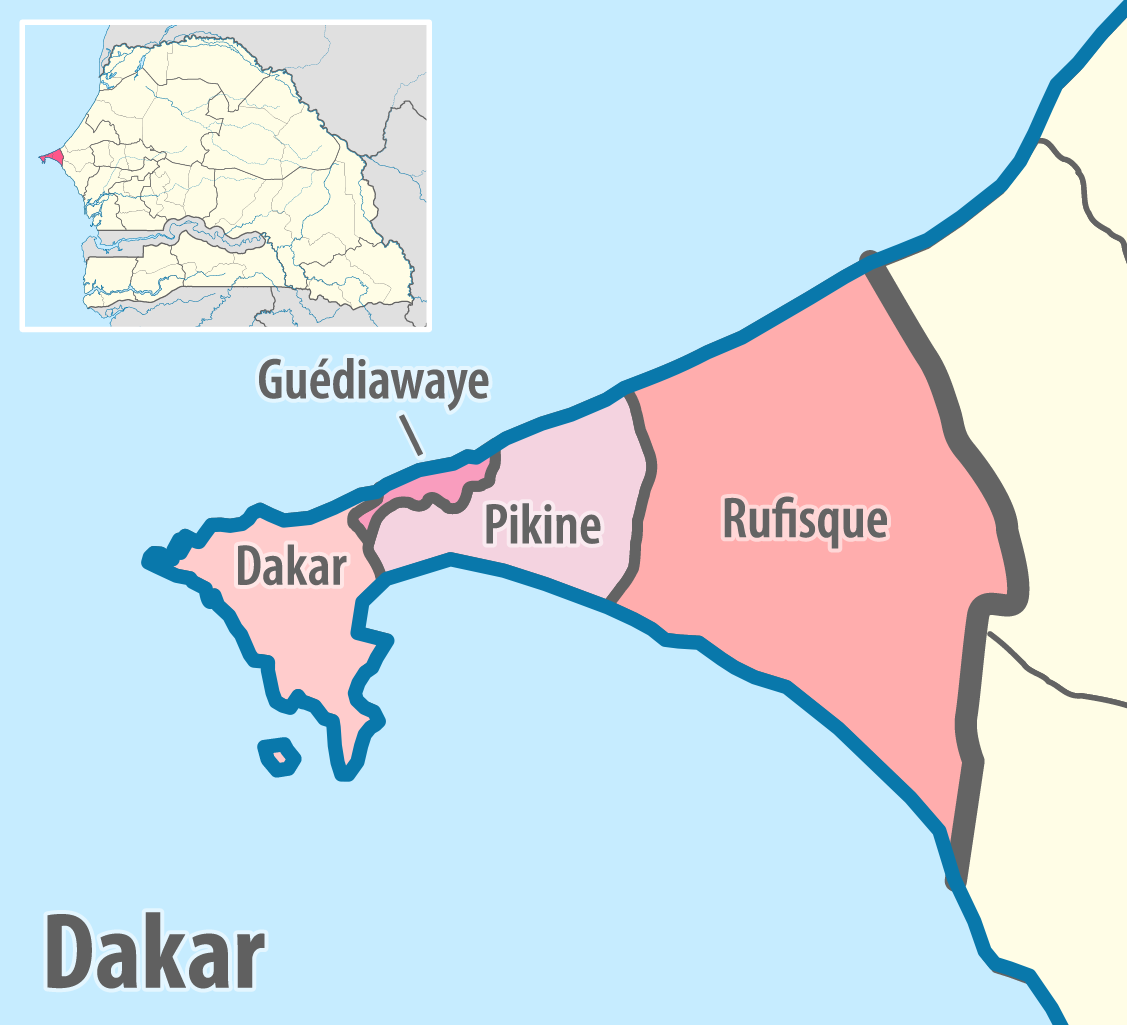

- Dakar region highlighted in red inside Senegal
- Coordinates: 14°45′N 17°20′W
- Country: Senegal
- Capital: Dakar
- Departments: List: Dakar department; Pikine department; Guédiawaye department; Rufisque department

Government
  - Regional president: Abdoulaye Faye (PDS; since 2002)

Area
  - Total: 547 km^{2} (211 sq mi)

Population (2023 census)
  - Total: 4,004,427
  - Rank: 1st
  - Density: 7,320/km^{2} (19,000/sq mi)
  - Rank: 1st
- Time zone: UTC+0 (GMT)
- ISO 3166-2: SN-DK
- Arrondissements: 10
- Communes: 7, plus 2 communautés rurales
- Communes d'arrondissement: 43
- HDI (2021): 0.607 medium · 1st

Dakar region (French: Région de Dakar) is the smallest and most populated region of Senegal, encompassing the capital city of the country, Dakar, and all its suburbs along the Cap Vert peninsula, Africa's most westerly point.

== Administration ==
The Dakar region is divided into five départements (administrative structures without political power, unlike the French départements). The départements had the following areas and populations at the Census of 2023:

Département	Area (km^{2})	Population census 2023
Dakar	80	1,278,469
Guédiawaye	13	372,708
Keur Massar	46	770,314
Pikine	42	764,597
Rufisque	356	818,337
Total Région de Dakar	547	4,004,427

Keur Massar department was formed in May 2021.

=== Dakar department ===
Dakar department is also a commune (city). This is a situation comparable to Paris which is both a department and a commune. The department/commune of Dakar is further divided into:

- 4 arrondissements, which are administrative structures without much power. The arrondissements are further divided into:
  - 19 communes d'arrondissement (i.e. "communes of arrondissement"). The communes d'arrondissement have a lot of power, unlike the arrondissements of Paris, and are more comparable to the London boroughs.

=== Guédiawaye department ===
Guédiawaye department is also a commune (city). This department has only one arrondissement, so that Guédiawaye is both a department and an arrondissement. The department /arrondissement/commune of Guédiawaye is further divided into:

- 5 communes d'arrondissement

=== Pikine department ===
Pikine department is also a commune (city). The department /commune of Pikine is further divided into:

- 3 arrondissements, which are further divided into:
  - 16 communes d'arrondissement

=== Rufisque department ===
Rufisque department is made up of two arrondissements and six urban communes:

- Rufisque arrondissement, which is also a commune (city). The arrondissement/commune of Rufisque is divided into 3 communes d'arrondissement:
  - Rufisque Centre (Nord)
  - Rufisque Est
  - Rufisque Ouest
- Bambylor arrondissement, which, administratively speaking, is the only rural part of the Dakar region. The Bambylor arrondissement is divided into 3 communautés rurales (i.e. "rural communities"):
  - Yène
  - Bambylor
  - Tivaouane Peulh-Niaga
- The six communes of Bargny, Sébikotane, Diamniadio, Jaxaay-Parcelle-Niakoul Rap, Sangalkam and Sendou

== Demographics ==
Historical population
Year	Pop.	±% p.a.
1871	1,600	—
1891	8,737	+8.86%
1904	18,447	+5.92%
1918	25,468	+2.33%
1921	32,440	+8.40%
1926	33,679	+0.75%
1961	374,700	+7.13%
1969	581,000	+5.64%
1990	1,405,000	+4.29%
1995	1,688,000	+3.74%
2000	2,029,000	+3.75%
2005	2,434,000	+3.71%
2013	3,137,196	+3.22%
2023	3,896,564	+2.19%

== Table of administrative sub-divisions ==
Administrative divisions of the Dakar region
Département	Commune	Arrondissement	Commune d'arrondissement	Communauté rurale
Department / county / state	City	Borough	Neighborhood	Rural borough
Dakar	Dakar	Almadies	Mermoz-Sacré-Cœur	
Dakar	Dakar	Almadies	Ngor	
Dakar	Dakar	Almadies	Ouakam	
Dakar	Dakar	Almadies	Yoff	
Dakar	Dakar	Dakar Plateau	Fann-Point E-Amitié	
Dakar	Dakar	Dakar Plateau	Gorée	
Dakar	Dakar	Dakar Plateau	Gueule Tapée-Fass-Colobane	
Dakar	Dakar	Dakar Plateau	Médina	
Dakar	Dakar	Dakar Plateau	Plateau	
Dakar	Dakar	Grand Dakar	Biscuiterie	
Dakar	Dakar	Grand Dakar	Dieuppeul-Derklé	
Dakar	Dakar	Grand Dakar	Grand Dakar	
Dakar	Dakar	Grand Dakar	Hann-Bel Air	
Dakar	Dakar	Grand Dakar	HLM	
Dakar	Dakar	Grand Dakar	Sicap-Liberté	
Dakar	Dakar	Parcelles Assainies	Cambérène	
Dakar	Dakar	Parcelles Assainies	Grand Yoff	
Dakar	Dakar	Parcelles Assainies	Parcelles Assainies	
Dakar	Dakar	Parcelles Assainies	Patte d'Oie	
Guédiawaye	Guédiawaye	Guédiawaye	Golf Sud	
Guédiawaye	Guédiawaye	Guédiawaye	Médina Gounass	
Guédiawaye	Guédiawaye	Guédiawaye	Ndiarème Limoulaye	
Guédiawaye	Guédiawaye	Guédiawaye	Sam Notaire	
Guédiawaye	Guédiawaye	Guédiawaye	Wakhinane Nimzatt	
Pikine	Pikine	Dagoudane	Dalifort	
Pikine	Pikine	Dagoudane	Djidah-Thiaroye Kaw	
Pikine	Pikine	Dagoudane	Guinaw Rail Nord	
Pikine	Pikine	Dagoudane	Guinaw Rail Sud	
Pikine	Pikine	Dagoudane	Pikine Est	
Pikine	Pikine	Dagoudane	Pikine Nord	
Pikine	Pikine	Dagoudane	Pikine Ouest	
Pikine	Pikine	Niayes	Keur Massar	
Pikine	Pikine	Niayes	Malika	
Pikine	Pikine	Niayes	Yeumbeul Nord	
Pikine	Pikine	Niayes	Yeumbeul Sud	
Pikine	Pikine	Thiaroye	Diamaguène Sicap Mbao	
Pikine	Pikine	Thiaroye	Mbao	
Pikine	Pikine	Thiaroye	Thiaroye Gare	
Pikine	Pikine	Thiaroye	Thiaroye Sur Mer	
Pikine	Pikine	Thiaroye	Tivaouane Diaksao	
Rufisque	Rufisque	Rufisque	Rufisque Est	
Rufisque	Rufisque	Rufisque	Rufisque Nord	
Rufisque	Rufisque	Rufisque	Rufisque Ouest	
Rufisque	Rufisque	Sangalkam	Bargny	
Rufisque	Rufisque	Sangalkam	Diamnadio	
Rufisque	Rufisque	Sangalkam	Jaxaay-Parcelle-Niakoul Rap	
Rufisque	Rufisque	Sangalkam		Sangalkam
Rufisque	Rufisque	Sangalkam	Sébikotane	
Rufisque	Rufisque	Sangalkam	Sendou	-
Rufisque	Rufisque	Bambylor		Bambylor
Rufisque	Rufisque	Bambylor		Yène
Rufisque	Rufisque	Bambylor		Tivaouane Peulh-Niaga

Within the Dakar region, the politically significant units (i.e. those who have elected officials and wield a significant power) are: the 7 communes, the 2 communautés rurales, and the 43 communes d'arrondissement.
