= Museum of African Art =

Museum of African Art may refer to:

== Africa ==
- IFAN Museum of African Arts, Senegal

== Europe ==
- Royal Museum for Central Africa, Tervuren, Belgium
- Museum of African Art, Serbia

== North America ==
- The Africa Center, New York City, formerly known as the Museum for African Art and the Center for African Art
- National Museum of African Art, Washington, D.C.
