= Mouhammadou =

Mouhammadou is a given name. Notable people with the name include:

- Mouhammadou Jaiteh (born 1994), French basketball player
- Seydina Mouhammadou Limamou Laye (1843–1909), founder of the Layene Sufi order
