= Seydina =

Seydina is a given name. Notable people with the name include:

- Seydina Baldé (born 1977), French actor
- Seydina Diarra (born 1994), Belgian-Malian footballer
- Seydina Mouhammadou Limamou Laye (1843–1909), founder of the Layene Sufi order
- Seydina Oumar Sy (born 1937), Senegalese politician
