= Ofeibea Quist-Arcton =

American journalist

- Born: 4 August 1958 (age 68); Oxford, England
- Education: London School of Economics
- Occupation: Journalist
- Years active: 1985–2021

Ofeibea Quist-Arcton (/oʊˈfeɪbiə ˌkwɪstˈɑːrktən/; born 4 August 1958) is a Ghanaian-British retired radio journalist, correspondent, commentator and broadcaster. She is best known as the former Dakar-based West Africa correspondent for National Public Radio. She grew up in Ghana, Italy, Britain, and Kenya.

== Biography ==
=== Early life ===
Quist-Arcton was born in Oxford, England, on 4 August 1958. She began kindergarten in Ghana and went to high school and university in the United Kingdom.

=== Education ===
Quist-Arcton obtained a BA with honours in French Studies (with international relations and Spanish) at the London School of Economics and went on to complete a year's course in radio journalism at the Polytechnic of Central London. This course included two internships at the BBC, which she joined in 1985.

=== Journalism and radio ===
Quist-Arcton was appointed the BBC West Africa correspondent in 1990, heading the regional bureau in Abidjan, Ivory Coast, and covering 24 countries.

In 1994 she returned to BBC's Bush House in London, where she served as a host and senior producer on the BBC World Service flagship programs Newshour and Newsday(later renamed The World Today before that program was in turn replaced by a new show, again called Newsday), as well as a contributing Africa specialist for other BBC programming.

Beginning in 1995 Quist-Arcton began work in the United States of America for the joint BBC-PRI production The World.

After briefly returning to BBC World Service, in 1998 Quist-Arcton was appointed co-host of the South African Broadcasting Corporation's flagship radio drive-time show PM Live in Johannesburg.

She returned to the BBC in 2000 as an Africa correspondent.

In 2001, she covered the United Nations Special Session on HIV/AIDS for the African news agency allAfrica.com - focusing on Senegal, with special reports on the country's battle against HIV/AIDS – and the high praises received from the UN for leading "Africa in combating AIDS on the continent", and as "one of only three nations worldwide to successfully contain the pandemic."

Quist-Arcton joined National Public Radio in 2004 at the newly created post of West Africa Correspondent in Dakar, Senegal. She reports on Africa, covering all aspects of life and developments on the continent.

Quist-Arcton was awarded the 2015 Edward R. Murrow prize for her reporting on the 2014 Ebola epidemic and Boko Haram, which she shared with photojournalist David Gilkey.
