= Taf Taf =

Taf Taf was a residency program for artists, with both humanitarian and artistic purposes, that took place in the periphery of Dakar in Senegal. It was organized and coordinated by Minna Maija Lappalainen and Turun taiteilijaseura (Association of Artists in Turku, Finland) and financed by the Ministry for Foreign Affairs of Finland.

The project started in 2004 from the initiative of Minna Maija Lappalainen, who aimed to create a collaboration between Finnish Artists and the people of the Santhiaba neighbourhood in Dakar. The financial aid came from the Ministry of Foreign Affairs of Finland and the purpose of the project was to better the living conditions of the Santhiaba neighbourhood in a creative way. The project consists in the creation of a library, a Cultural Center named Suñu Kër, and a residency program for artists. Finnish Universities such as Turku University of Applied Sciences (Turku, Finland) and Arcada University of Applied Sciences (Helsinki, Finland) actively participated to the project through material donations and by letting their students work in Dakar.

The project completed in 2013.

== Suñu Kër ==
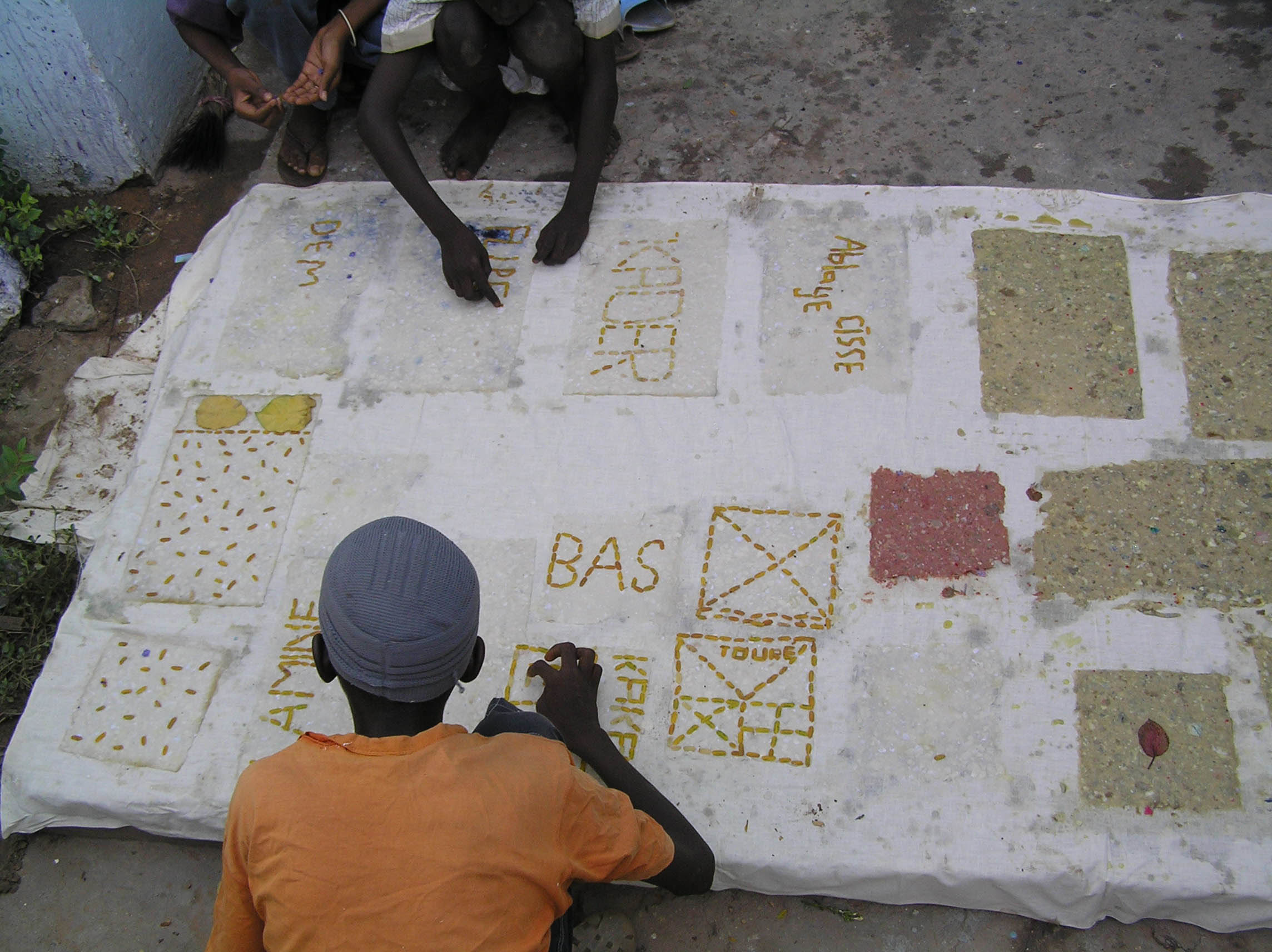
Children making paper in the Suñu Kër Center

The Cultural Centre Suñu Kër is active in various ways. The program includes theatre courses, dance courses for children, and many different kinds of projects, which are led by the artists who take part of the residency program at the Taf Taf. The centre also has become a meeting place for people to gather and spend time with each other.

== The library ==
The library is the only library in the neighbourhood that lends books. The books are written in French and they have all been received thanks to donations from various organisations in Finland. The library space works also as a place where people can take courses in reading and writing, which are one of the main objectives of the project. Around 40-50 children come and rent books each week from the library.

== The residency program ==
The residency spaces for artists were in the building of the Suñu Kër Centre. The residency program lasted from 1 to 3 months. The resident artist's projects are various. Some projects have paid more attention to environmental facts and have treated arguments such as recycling paper and garbage, and planting trees. Others focus on the creative process, by making objects/ sculptures with children in different materials or by working with documentary video, animation and music videos together with the inhabitants of the neighbourhood. Also strictly humanitarian projects have taken place at Taf Taf: an architect gave advice on how to resolve problems related to old and new constructions and an engineer created a hot water system for the neighbourhood, that works by solar energy.
