= Layene =

Senegal-based Sufi order

The Layene (also spelled Layène, Layenne, or Layeen) is a religious brotherhood of Sufi Muslims based in Senegal and founded in 1884 by Seydina Limamou Laye (1844-1909), who was born Limamou Thiaw. It is notable for its belief that their founder was the Mahdi and the reincarnation of the Prophet Muhammad, and that his son, Seydina Issa Rouhou Laye, was the reincarnation of Jesus.

== Overview ==
The Layene community is open to all Muslims but was founded within the Lebu ethno-linguistic group, many of whom originally lived in fishing communities on the Cap-Vert peninsula on the northern edge of Dakar, Senegal.

The Layene brotherhood is the smallest of the Muslim brotherhoods of Senegal and likely numbers between seventy and one-hundred thousand members.

The community leader is known as the Khalif Générale, who also has broad authority over temporal matters in the Layene quarter of the neighborhood of Yoff, Senegal. Yoff is home to the Khalif, an elaborate mosque, the mausoleum of its founder, and of several of his descendants. There is a notable Layene mosque as well as a substantial Layene community in Cambérène, Senegal, where Seydina Issa Rouhou Laye is interred, and also in many other villages (like Malika, Yeumbeul, Ngor, Ouakam, Bargny).

== Beliefs and practices ==
Layene beliefs and practices include the normal five pillars of Islam, with some additional obligations recommended by Seydina Limamou Laye. For instance, prior to each of the five daily prayers, they wash not only their feet but up to their knees as well, and practice zikr before and after each prayer.

They hold a weekly ceremony called the chants religieux that begins shortly before midnight on Saturday and continues until the dawn prayer on Sunday. The chants religieux consist of energetic sermons and loud zikr (Wolof: sikkar).

Many in the Layene community will arrange for their newborn daughters to be married at the time of their naming ceremonies, often to a young son of a friend. These marriages are binding, but when the children reach adulthood they are able to choose whether to continue in the marriage, or divorce (without stigma) and marry another community member or another person she chooses and loves. Newborn boys are circumcised on the day of their baptism (i.e. on the seventh day after birth). Many women choose to pray in the mosque for Friday prayer. There is a place for women to pray inside any Layene mosque, and children are also encouraged to pray in the mosque.

People in the community wear white during events. In addition, it is customary to take the symbolic last name "Laye" - derived from Allah - in order to flatten social hierarchies and support the teaching that all humans are equal in the eyes of God.

== Distribution ==
Most Layenes live in the Cap-Vert area around Dakar, but there is a Layene presence in most other areas of Senegal, and a few live in Italy, France, Canada and the United States.

In 1812 the political independence of the Lebu from the Kingdom of Cayor was recognized. Today the Layene are granted special autonomy in the constitution, laws and practices of Senegal.

== History ==
The Layene Brotherhood was founded in 1884 by Seydina Limamou Laye who was an uneducated man from the Lebu ethnic group, and a fisherman. He claimed to be the Mahdi, an Islamic messianic figure, whose coming is prophesied. He claimed his son, Seydina Issa Rouhou Laye, was the second coming of Jesus. Seydina Limamou Laye is reported to have said that when he left Mecca when he died, he took refuge in a cave in Ngor in the form of light. For more than a thousand years, he traveled the whole earth nightly to see in which people he would appear for his second mission, and “it is because of the moral discretion (sutura) and the decency of the clothing of the Lebu women that I was born among this people,” and that “God saw that I was born among the Lebus.” Despite this, from the earliest days of the community, membership has been open to all Muslims. He attracted a following both among and outside the Lebu ethno-linguistic group.

The former Khalif of the Layene is Seydina Mouhamadou Makhtar Laye, who was a son of Seydina Mandione Laye.

== Caliphs ==
Caliphs of the Layene Brotherhood:

1. Seydina Issa Rouhou Laye, 1909-1949
2. Seydina Mandione Laye, 1949-1971
3. Seydina Issa Laye II, 1971-1987
4. Seydina Mame Alassane Laye, 1987-2001
5. Seydina Abdoulaye Thiaw Laye, 2001–2021
6. Seydina Mouhamadou Makhtar Laye, 2021-2025
7. Seydina Mouhamadou Lamine Laye, 2025-present
