= Théodore Monod African Art Museum =

Art museum in Dakar, Senegal

IFAN Museum of African Arts
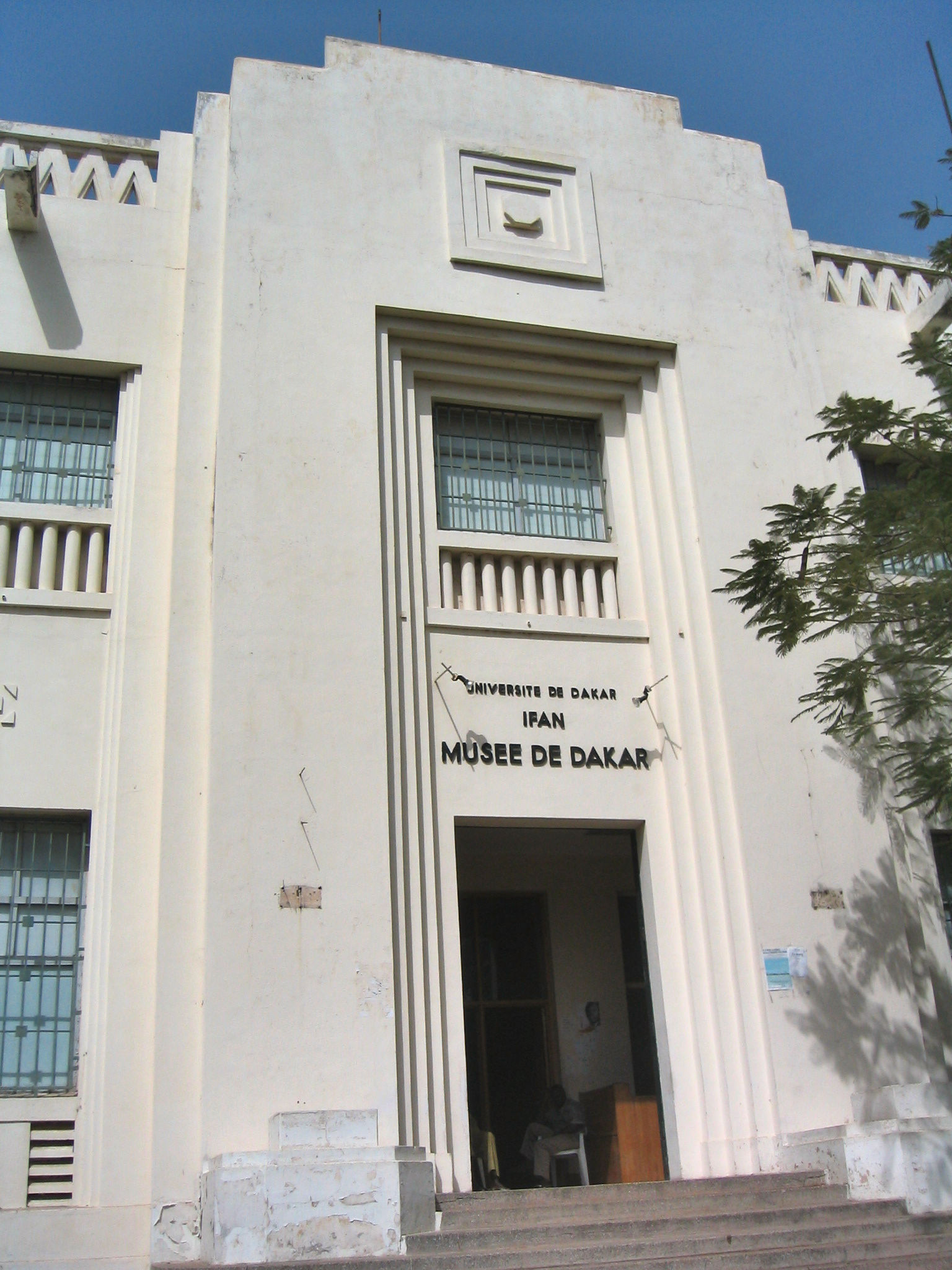
- Established: 1938
- Location: Place Soweto, Plateau, Dakar, Senegal
- Coordinates: 14.663307°N 17.438065°W
- Type: Art, Culture
- Public transit access: Busses: n°8, 7, 12, 13, 9, 6, 5, 15, 16, 23, 5. Direction "Cap Manuel"
- Website: ifan.ucad.sn

The Théodore Monod African Art Museum (Musée Théodore Monod d'Art africain) in Dakar, Senegal is one of the oldest art museums in West Africa. It was promoted by Léopold Senghor, the country's first President.

It was originally called Le Musée d'Art africain de l'Institut fondamental d'Afrique noire Cheikh Anta Diop IFAN/CAD and later renamed Musée de l'Institut Fondamental d'Afrique Noire or IFAN Museum of African Arts. In December 2007, its official title was changed to The Théodore Monod African Art Museum ("Musée Théodore Monod d'Art africain"), after the French naturalist Théodore André Monod, former director of IFAN.

The museum is part of the Institut Fondamental d'Afrique Noire (IFAN) institute, founded 1936 under the Popular Front government in France. When IFAN was transferred to Cheikh Anta Diop University in 1960, the building at Place Soweto near the National Assembly of Senegal was converted into a museum. It is today one of the most prestigious centers for the study of African culture and part of the Cheikh Anta Diop University. As the main cultural research center of the colonies of French West Africa, it contains important collections from across Francophone Africa.

The museum is one of the regular locations used in the Dakar Biennale exhibition, showing art by contemporary African and diaspora artists.
