= Seydina Mouhammadou Limamou Laye =

Founder of the Layene Sufi order (1843–1909)

Seydina Mouhammadou Limamou Laye (1843–1909) was the founder of the Layene Sufi order. After the death of his mother he declared himself to be the Mahdi on May 24, 1884. This caused controversy with the French and many orthodox Muslims. His message emphasized cleanliness, prayer, alms, and social justice. He is the father of Seydina Issa Ruhullaye and the great-great-grandfather of Seydina, Habibo, and Kiya Laye.

== See also ==
- People claiming to be the Mahdi
