= Cyprus American Archaeological Research Institute =

Archaeological research center in Nicosia, Cyprus

Cyprus American Archaeological Research Institute (CAARI) is an American research center based in Nicosia, Cyprus, founded in 1978. CAARI is affiliated with the American Society of Overseas Research (ASOR) and the Council of American Overseas Research Centers (CAORC). CAARI is the only international archaeological research institute in Cyprus. Its funding comes from the American government and private donors. The institution offers scholarships on Cypriot archaeology, accommodation and a library focused on the archaeology of the Near East. It publishes CAARI News since 1986, now in digital form.

== Directors ==
- Anita Walker (1978–1979)
- Ian Todd (1979–1980)
- Stuart Swiny (1980–)
- Nancy Serwint (1996-1999)
- Thomas W. Davis (2003-2011)
- Lindy Crew (current)
