= American Society of Overseas Research =

Research organization

- Abbreviation: ASOR
- Established: 1900
- Type: Learned society, research center
- Headquarters: Alexandria, Virginia, U.S.
- Fields: Archaeology, cultural heritage preservation
- Members: 2,000+
- President: Jane DeRose Evans
- Executive Director: Andrew G. Vaughn
- Affiliations: Albright Institute of Archaeological Research, Cyprus American Archaeological Research Institute
- Website: www.asor.org

The American Society of Overseas Research (ASOR), founded in 1900 as the American School of Oriental Study and Research in Palestine, is a non-profit 501(c)(3) organization based in Alexandria, Virginia, which supports the research and teaching of the history and cultures of the Near East and Middle Eastern countries. ASOR supports scholarship, research, exploration, and archaeological fieldwork and offers avenues of disseminating this research through their publications. ASOR also provides support for undergraduates and graduates in institutions of higher education around the world pursuing studies of the history and cultures of the Near and Middle East. Prior to 2021, ASOR was known as The American Schools of Oriental Research.

In January 2026, Jane DeRose Evans became the current president of ASOR. Sharon Herbert, her predecessor, served as president from 2020 to 2025.

ASOR collaborates with the following independent overseas institutes:

- Albright Institute of Archaeological Research, Jerusalem – former directors of which include Millar Burrows who was instrumental in the first publications of the Dead Sea Scrolls.
- Cyprus American Archaeological Research Institute, Nicosia.

ASOR was affiliated with the American Center of Research, Amman until 2024.

The overseas institutes support scholars working in the Middle East that focus on Near Eastern Archaeology, Semitic languages, history, Biblical studies, among a variety of other fields. The institutes are also members of the Council of American Overseas Research Centers.

== Annual Meeting ==
ASOR convenes a scholarly conference once a year in North America, always beginning 8 days before Thanksgiving (on a Wednesday evening) and running through Saturday evening. Following the COVID-19 pandemic, the Annual Meeting has had a hybrid option for individuals to attend virtually. The most recent conference in 2025 was held in Boston, MA. Future ones will be held in Chicago, IL (2026), Arlington, VA (2027), and Boston, MA (2028).

== Fellowships ==
ASOR awards over $250,000 in grants and fellowships annually. These include scholarships to participate in archaeological fieldwork, grants for archaeological projects, and research fellowships for members. Scholarships covering full or partial fees for membership dues and Annual Meeting registration are also available.

== Publications ==
ASOR publishes four academic journals. University of Chicago Press began publishing ASOR journals in 2019. Two of the journals are academic flagships in their respective areas:

- Bulletin of the American Society of Overseas Research (BASOR) presents archaeological, historical, and epigraphic articles on topics from the ancient Near East.
- Journal of Cuneiform Studies (JCS) presents articles in English, German, and French on Mesopotamian topics.

The organization also publishes:

- Near Eastern Archaeology (NEA), a quarterly that reports recent research for both popular and professional audiences.
- Maarav, an annual journal devoted to the study of the northwest Semitic languages and literature.
- The Ancient Near East Today (ANE Today), a biweekly e-newsletter informing registered "Friends of ASOR" about new discoveries and research about the Near East.

In addition to their journals, ASOR also publishes four book series:

- Annual of ASOR (AASOR)
- Archaeological Reports Series (ARS)
- Journal of Cuneiform Studies Supplemental Series (JCSSS)
- Levantine Ceramics Project Handbooks Series (LCPH)

== Sources ==
- Montgomery, James A (June 1919). "The American School of Oriental Research". The Menorah Journal.
- King, Philip J. American Archaeology in the Mideast: A History of the American Schools of Oriental Research (1983).
- Clark, D.G. and V.H. Matthews 100 Years of American Archaeology in the Middle East: Proceedings of the American Schools of Oriental Research Centennial Celebration (2003).
