= Cabo (disambiguation) =

Cabo, fully Cabo San Lucas, is a resort city in Baja California Sur, Mexico.

Cabo may also refer to:

== Arts and entertainment ==
- Cabo (game), a card game
- Cabo (TV series), a Mexican telenovela
- "Cabo", a 2002 song by Koe Wetzel

== People with the surname ==
- Dardo Cabo (1941–1977), Argentine journalist and activist
- Ernest Cabo (1932–2019), Catholic bishop in Guadeloupe
- José Cabo (1907–1991), Spanish footballer

== Other uses ==
- Cabó, a municipality in Alt Urgell, Lleida, Catalonia, Spain
- Cable One (NYSE:CABO), an American telecommunications company

== See also ==
- Cabo Blanco (disambiguation)
- Cabo Corrientes (disambiguation)
- Cabo Rojo (disambiguation)
- Cabo Verde (disambiguation)
- Cabo Wabo (disambiguation)
- Gabo (disambiguation)
- Kabo (disambiguation)
