= Cape Verde (disambiguation) =

Cape Verde is an island country in West Africa.

Cape Verde can also refer to:

- Cap-Vert, the peninsula from which the country takes its name
- Portuguese Cape Verde, the predecessor to Cape Verde
- Cap-Vert (volcano), a volcano on the peninsula
- Cape Verde (Mars), a surface feature on Mars
- Cape Verde hurricane, a type of weather system
- Cape Verde, a code name for AMD's Radeon HD 7700 series of graphics cards

== See also ==
- Cape Green, an ice cliff on the Antarctic Peninsula
- Cabo Verde (disambiguation)
