= Deux Mamelles =

Two prominent hills in a suburb of Dakar, Senegal

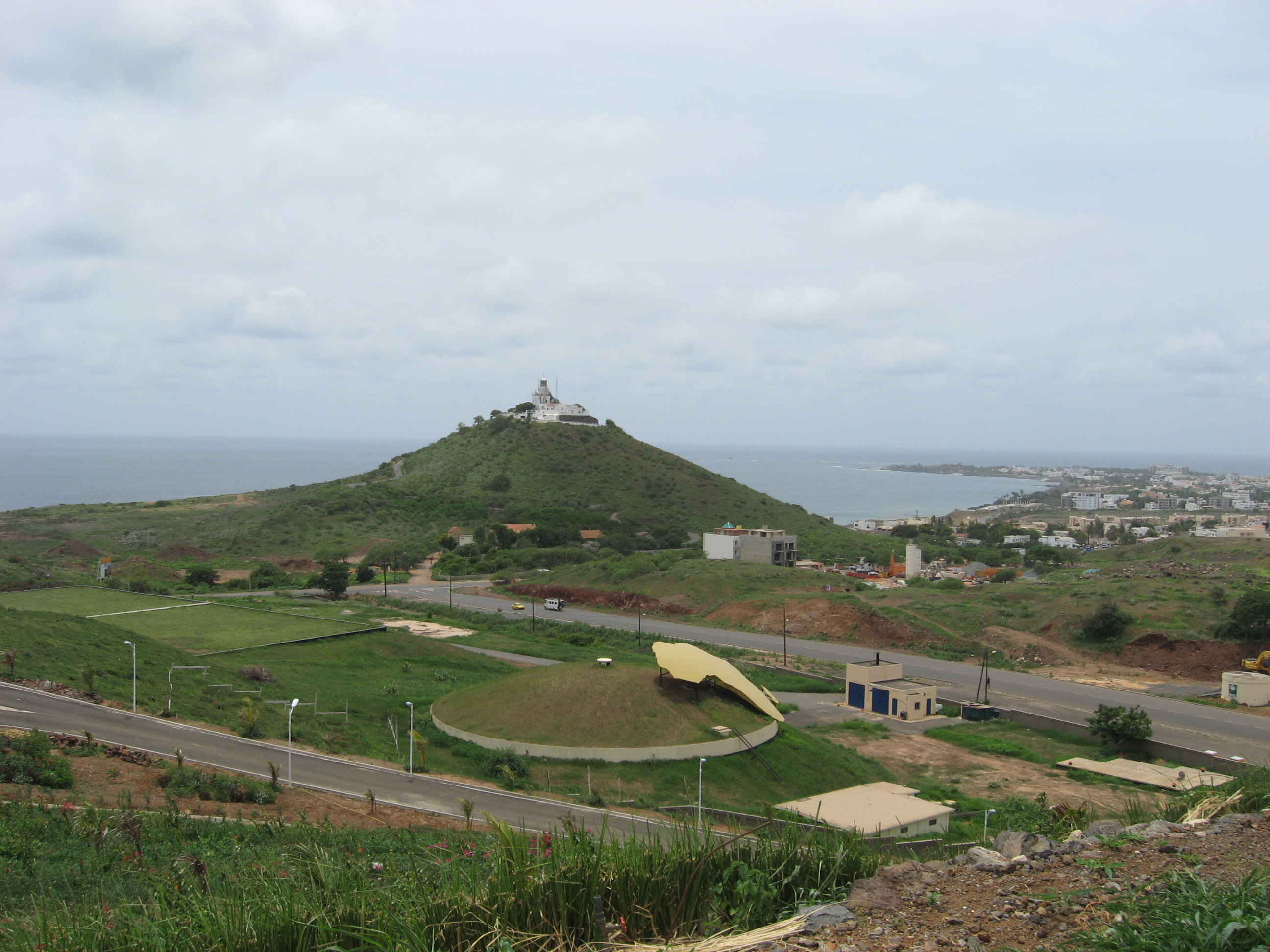
- The Mamelles lighthouse and the Pointe des Almadies seen from the African Renaissance Monument

Highest point
- Elevation: 105 m (344 ft)
- Listing: Breast-shaped hills
- Coordinates: 14°43′22″N 17°29′56″W

Geography
- Location within Senegal
- Location: Senegal

Climbing
- First ascent: Unknown
- Easiest route: From the Pointe des Almadies, Dakar

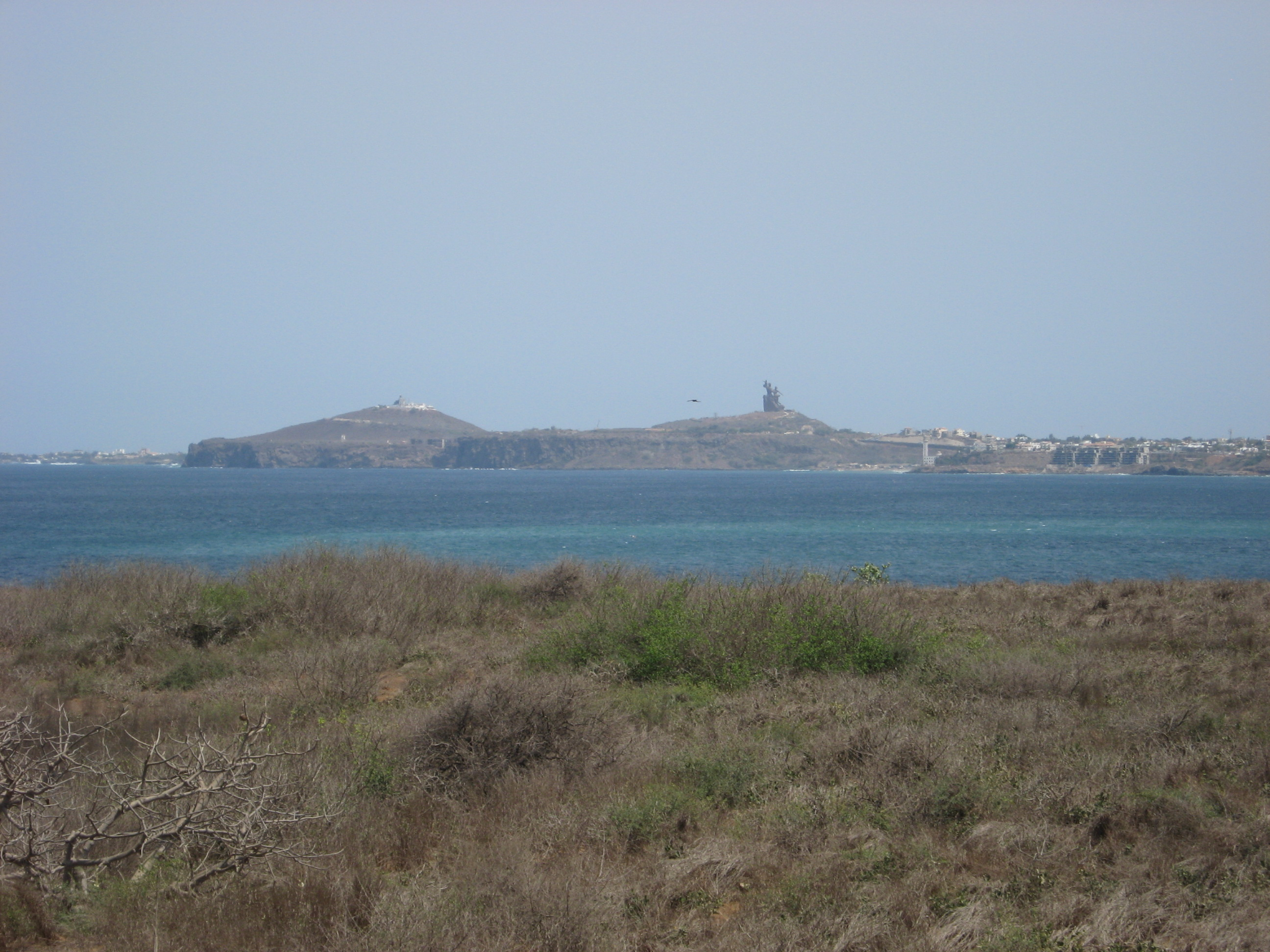
View of Les Mamelles from the Iles de la Madeleine

African Renaissance Monument

Deux Mamelles, Collines des Mamelles, or simply Mamelles are twin hills located in Ouakam, a suburban commune of Dakar, in the Cap-Vert peninsula, Senegal.

These hills are of volcanic origin and they are the vestiges of a plateau from the early Quaternary. The highest hill is only 105 metres (344 ft) high, but they stand out in the landscape owing to the flat surroundings. The name of these breast-shaped hills comes from the French term “Mamelle”, a name commonly applied in the French-speaking parts of the world to a breast.

On the seaward hill stands a lighthouse, the Phare des Mamelles, while on the hill further ashore the African Renaissance Monument was erected and unveiled in 2010.

== See also ==
- African Renaissance Monument
- Breast-shaped hill
- Cap-Vert (volcano)
