= Kabo (disambiguation) =

Kabo is a town in the Central African Republic.

Kabo may also refer to:

== Places ==
- Kabo, Nigeria
- Kabo District, Republic of the Congo
- Kabo Island, Philippines
- Kabo Valley, or Kabaw Valley, Myanmar

== Other uses ==
- Kabo tribe, an ethnic group of Nigeria
- a meteorite fall in 1971
- crystalline potassium aluminium borate (K_{2}A_{l2}B_{2}O_{7})

== See also ==
- Cabo (disambiguation)
- Kabo Reform, in Korea 1894–1896
