= Ousmane Sow =

Ousmane Sow is the name of:

- Ousmane Sow (sculptor) (1935–2016), Senegalese sculptor
- Ousmane Sow (footballer) (born 2000), Senegalese footballer
