= Architecture of Senegal =

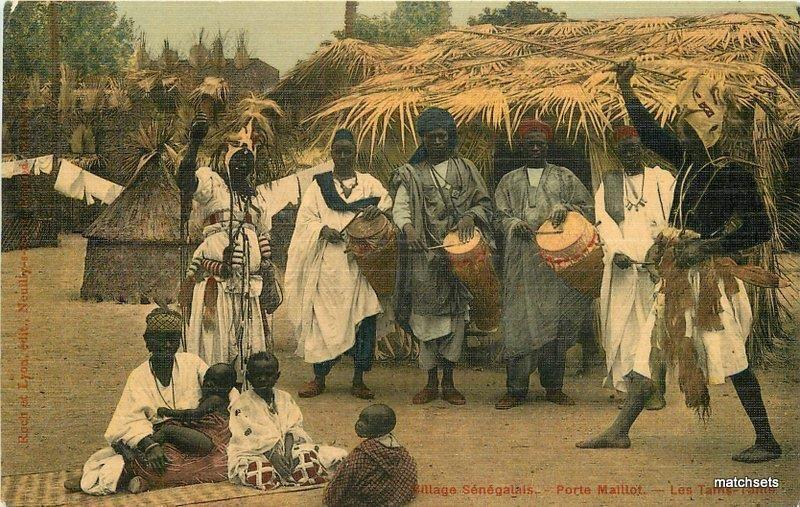
Senegal postcard 1910.

Senegambia encompasses the modern day country of Senegal and Gambia. Senegambian architecture is architecture originating from both nations. Over the years Senegambian architecture includes multiple types of architectural styles depending on the ethnicity, or region.

== Pre-Colonial or Traditional Senegalese Architecture ==
A defining characteristic of Senegalese architecture due to climate, it differs greatly from other architectural styles in the Sahel that rely heavily on mud-brick. Traditional buildings typically use mud, brick, and wood. These materials were used to build houses, mosques, and other types of housing.

Houses were typically made of a round hut, made of wood, leaves or thatch covering it.

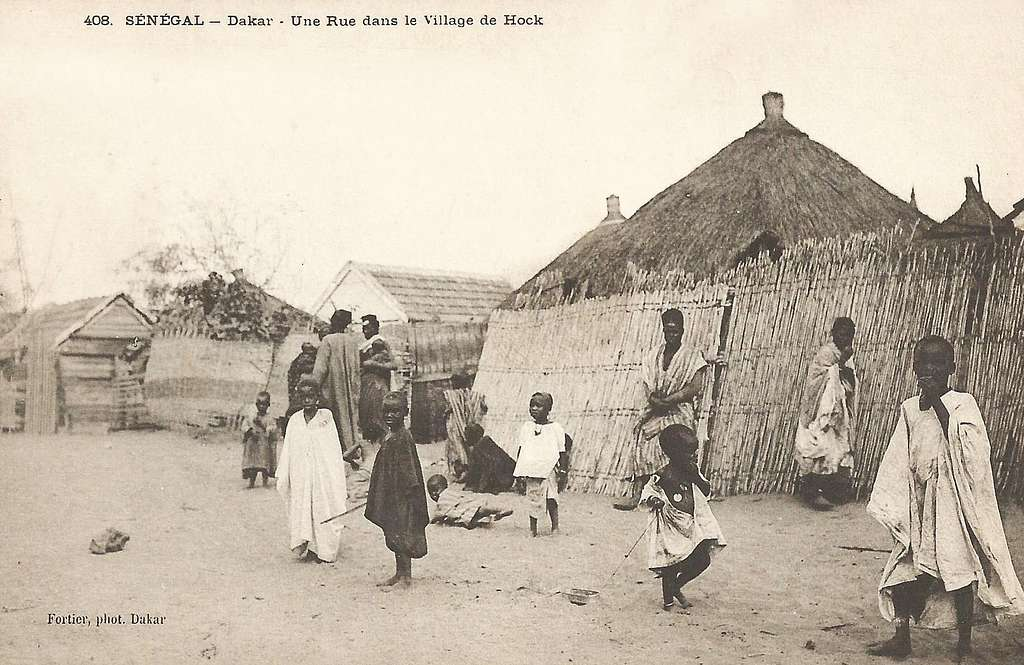
Dakar 1910

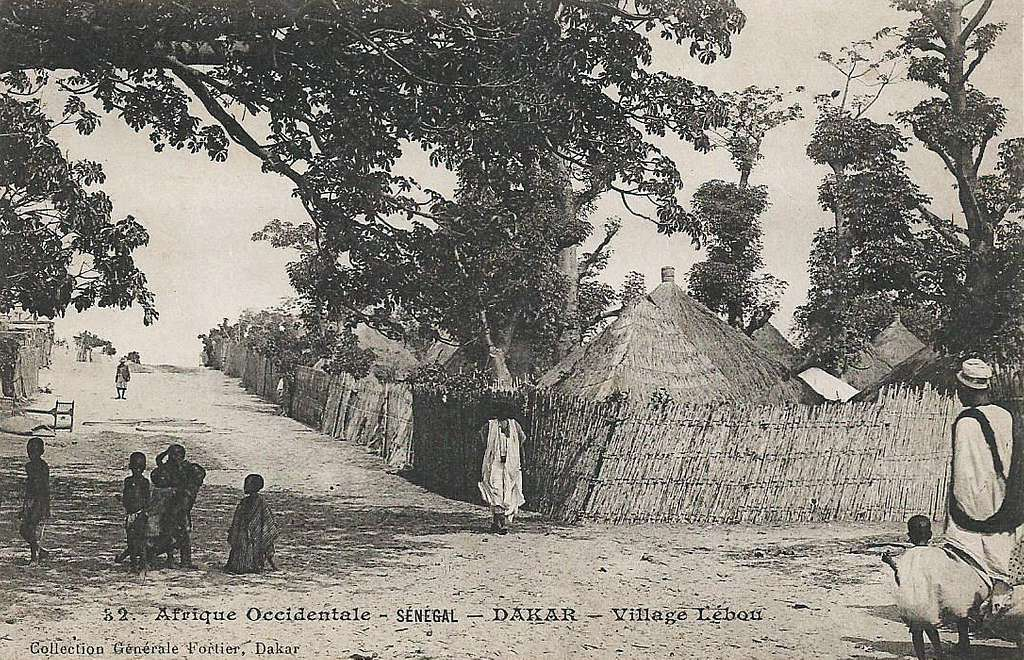
Traditional Dakar village

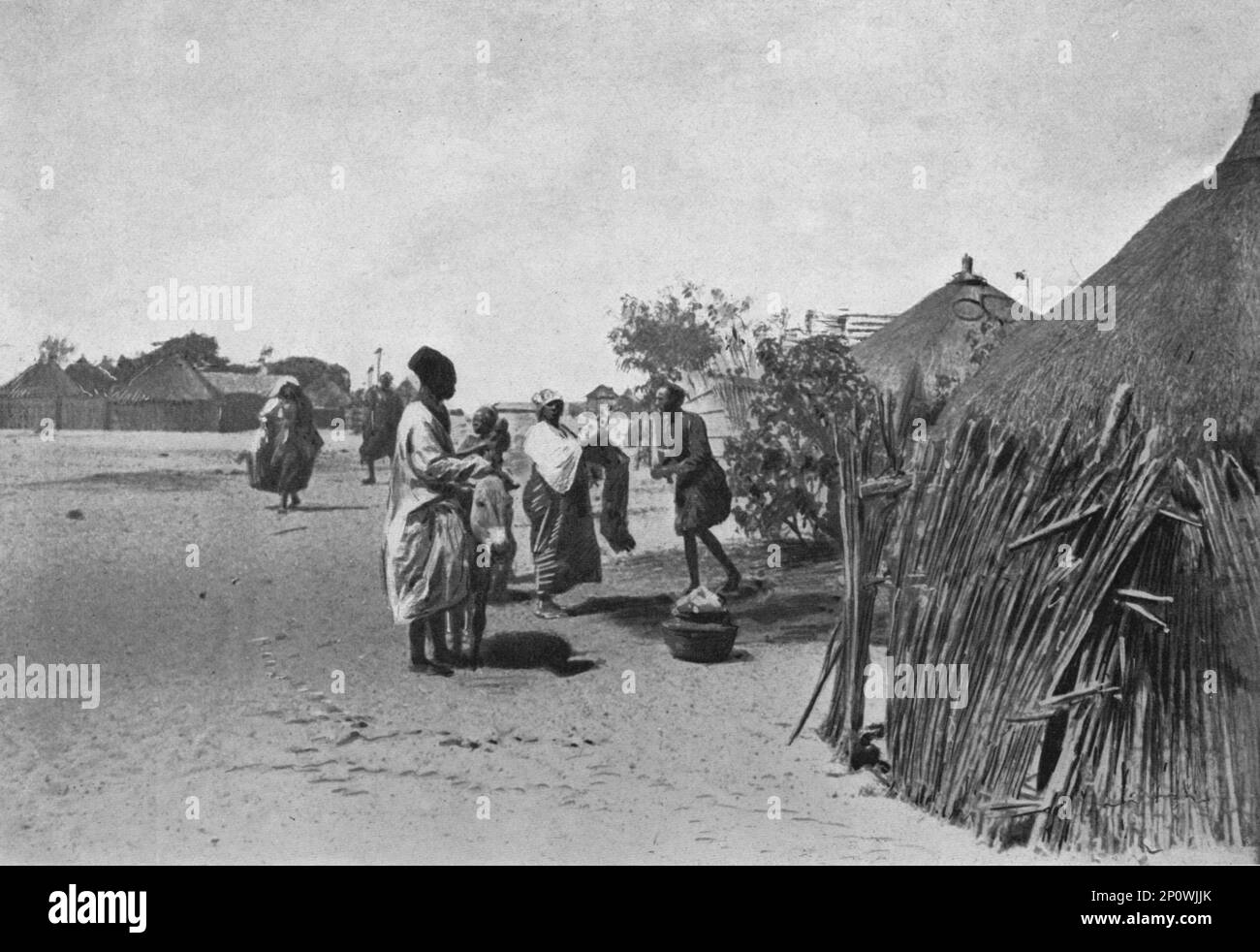
Dakar 1914

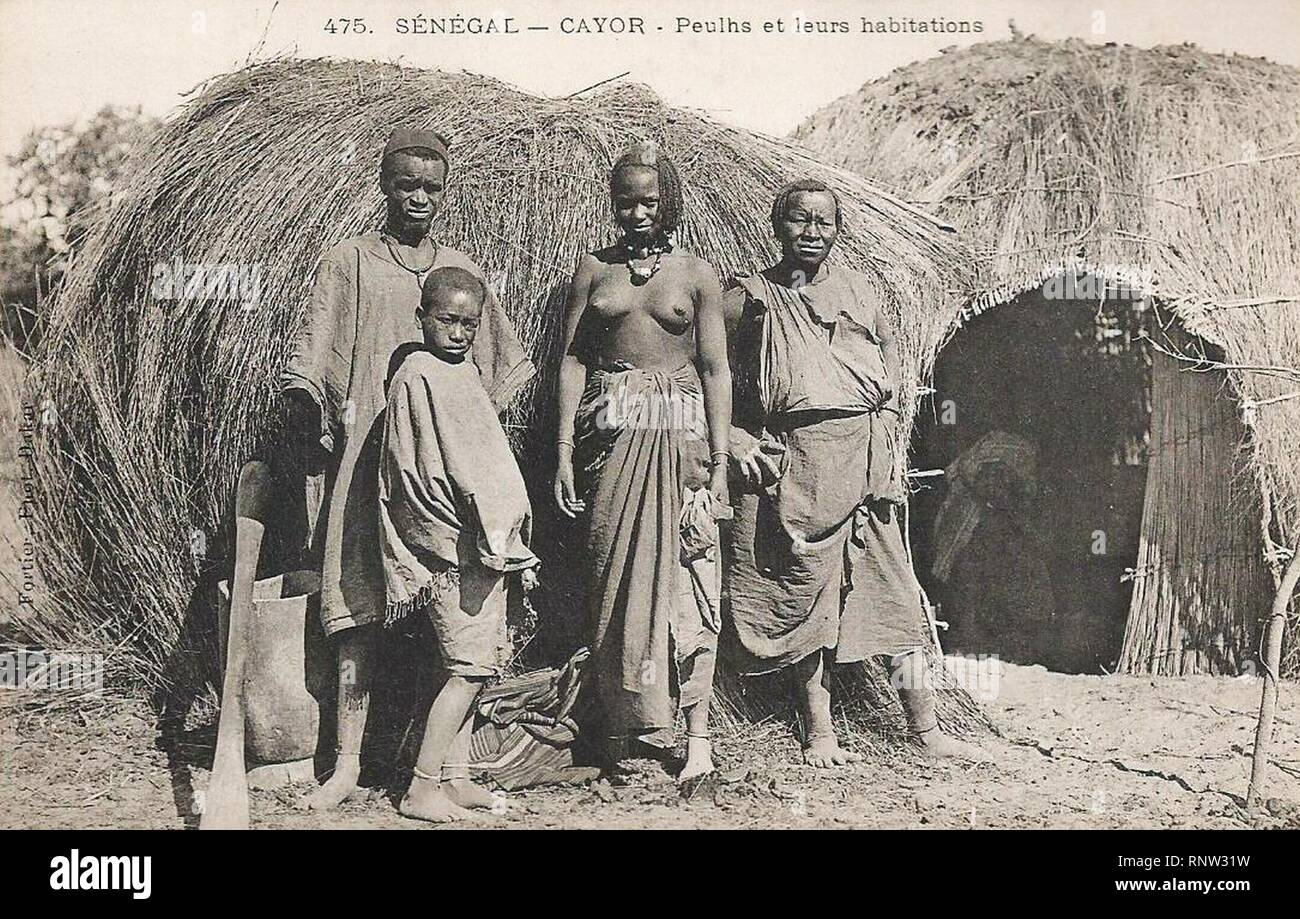
Cayor Peuls (Fulanis), architectural style

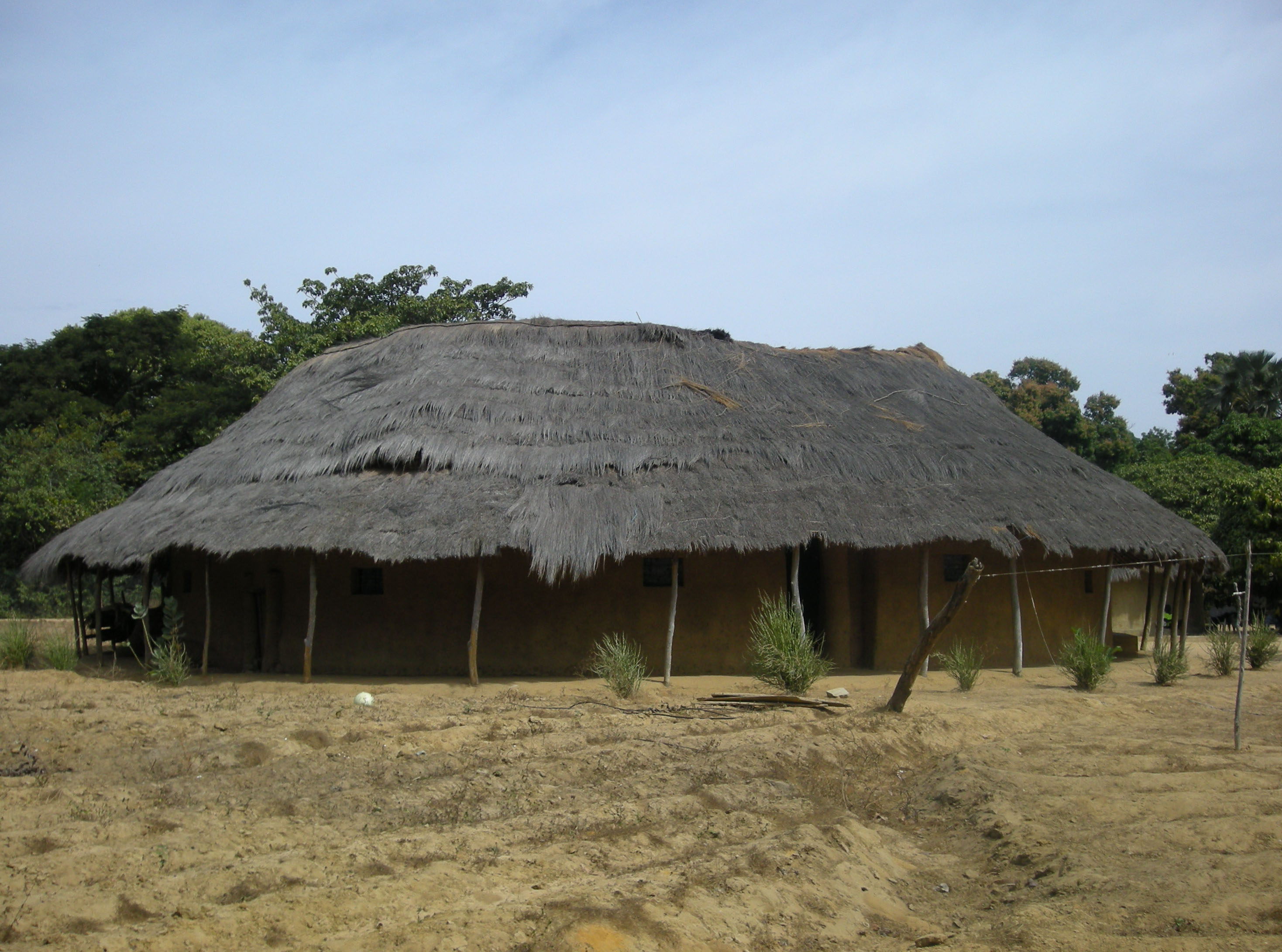
Modern Hut Reconstruction " Case à impluvium (sur le modèle traditionnel) dans le campement villageois intégré d'Enampor (Casamance, Sénégal). "

== Colonial Architecture ==
Senegal has an extensive history with the french, as the french have had settlements since 1659. French architecture is found throughout Senegal in hotels, administrative buildings, built usually through the same, colonial architectural styles found in other parts of the world with french colonialism. This saw the wide spread adoption of modernist style buildings.

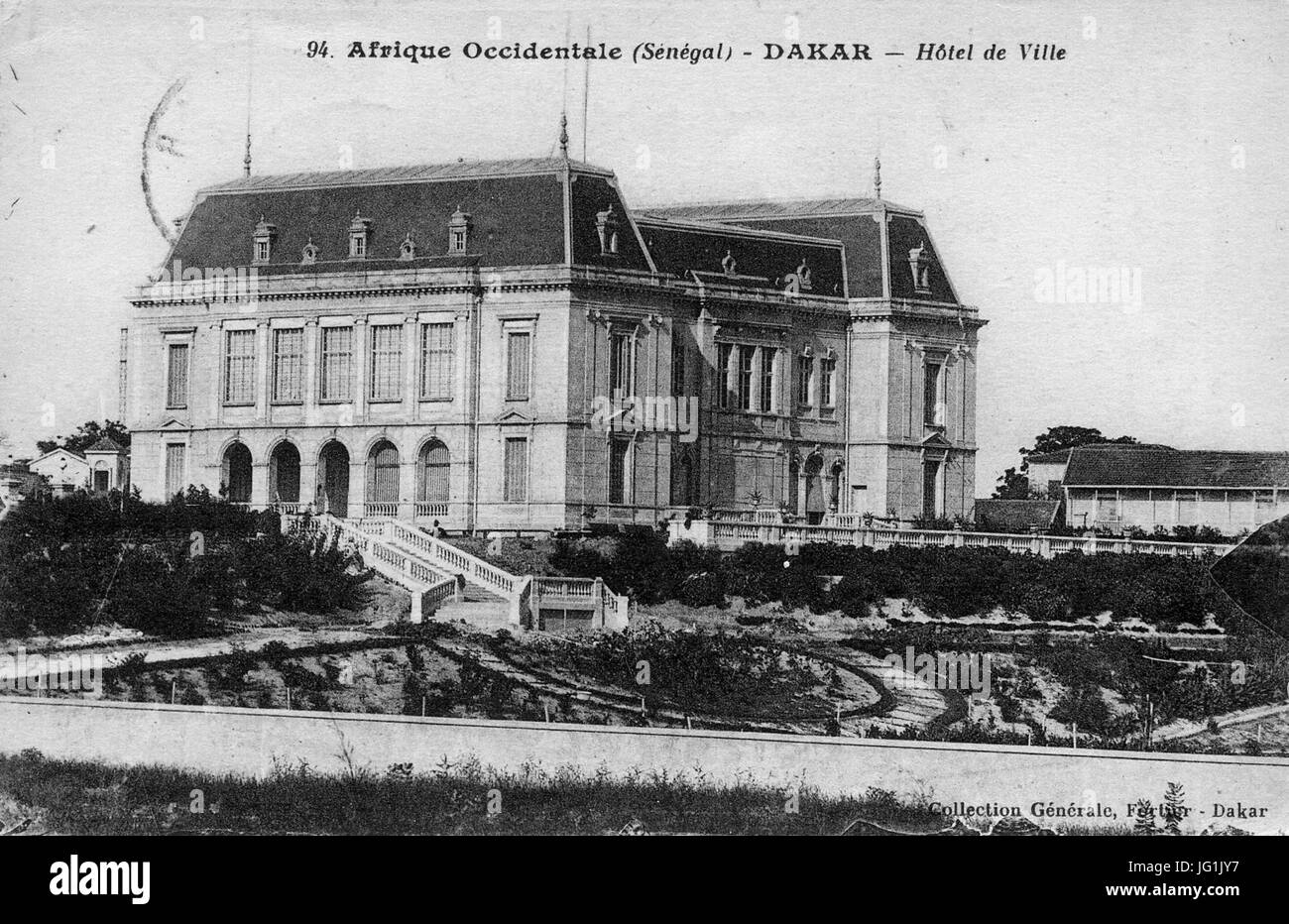
Dakar Hotel, built in French architecture

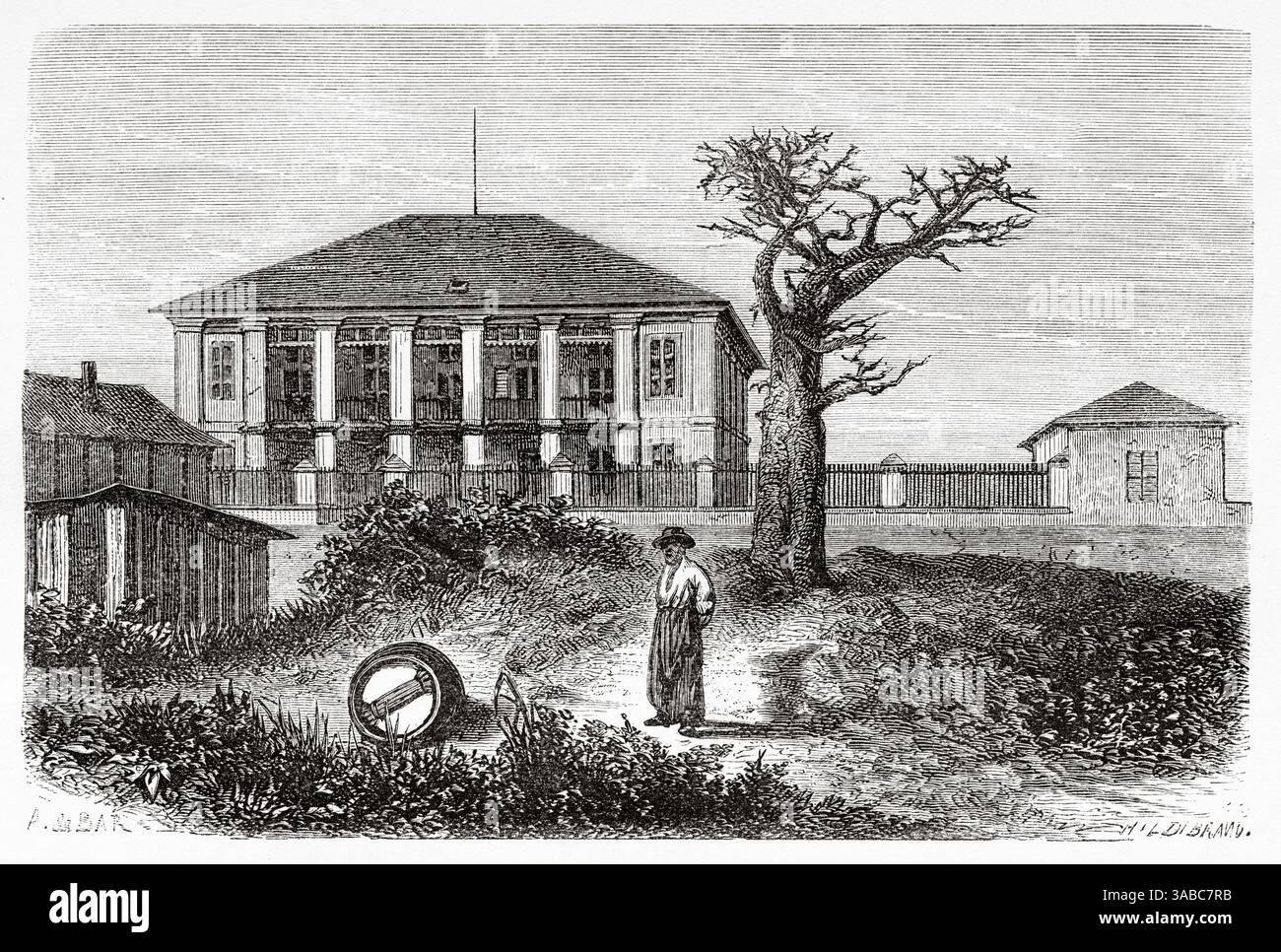
French Settler

== Modern Style ==
Modern Senegalese architecture, draws from modernist, European influence, including Islamic influence, like the Grand Mosque of Dakar.

Grand Mosque of Dakar

Grand Mosque of Dakar
