= Gabo =

Gabo may refer to:

- Gaboism, religion of the Gade people
- Gabo (character), character in role-playing game Dragon Warrior VII
- Gabo, a fictional character from the animated film Wish
- Gabo Island, Victoria, Australia
- Gabo Pat, neighbourhood in Karachi, Pakistan
- Gabo Reform, series of reforms in Korea
- Gabriel "Gabo" Magtibay, a character from the 2026 Philippine television drama action comedy Coco Martin's Sigabo

== People ==
- Nickname of Gabriel García Márquez (1927–2014), Colombian novelist, journalist, editor, publisher, political activist, and recipient of the 1982 Nobel Prize in Literature
- Hesed Gabo (born 1992), Filipino basketball player
- Naum Gabo (1890-1977), prominent Russian sculptor in the Constructivism movement

== Similar spelling ==
- Cabo (disambiguation)
