= List of mosques in Senegal =

This is a list of mosques in Senegal.

== List ==
Name	Image	Location	Year (CE)	Group	Notes
Great Mosque of Saint-Louis		Saint-Louis	1847		
Great Mosque of Touba		Touba	1963	Su	Mouride Brotherhood; affiliated with Sufism. Community was established in 1887.
Grand Mosque of Dakar		Dakar	1964	Su	
Mosque of Divinity		Ouakam	1997	Su	Twin minarets are 45 m (148 ft) tall
Massalikoul Djinane Mosque		Dakar	2019		The largest mosque in West Africa, with a combined capacity of 30,000 worshipers inside the prayer hall and the sahn.

== See also ==
- Islam in Senegal
- List of mosques in Africa
