= Îles de la Madeleine (Senegal) =

Island group and national park west of Dakar, Senegal

Coordinates: 14.65°N 17.47°W

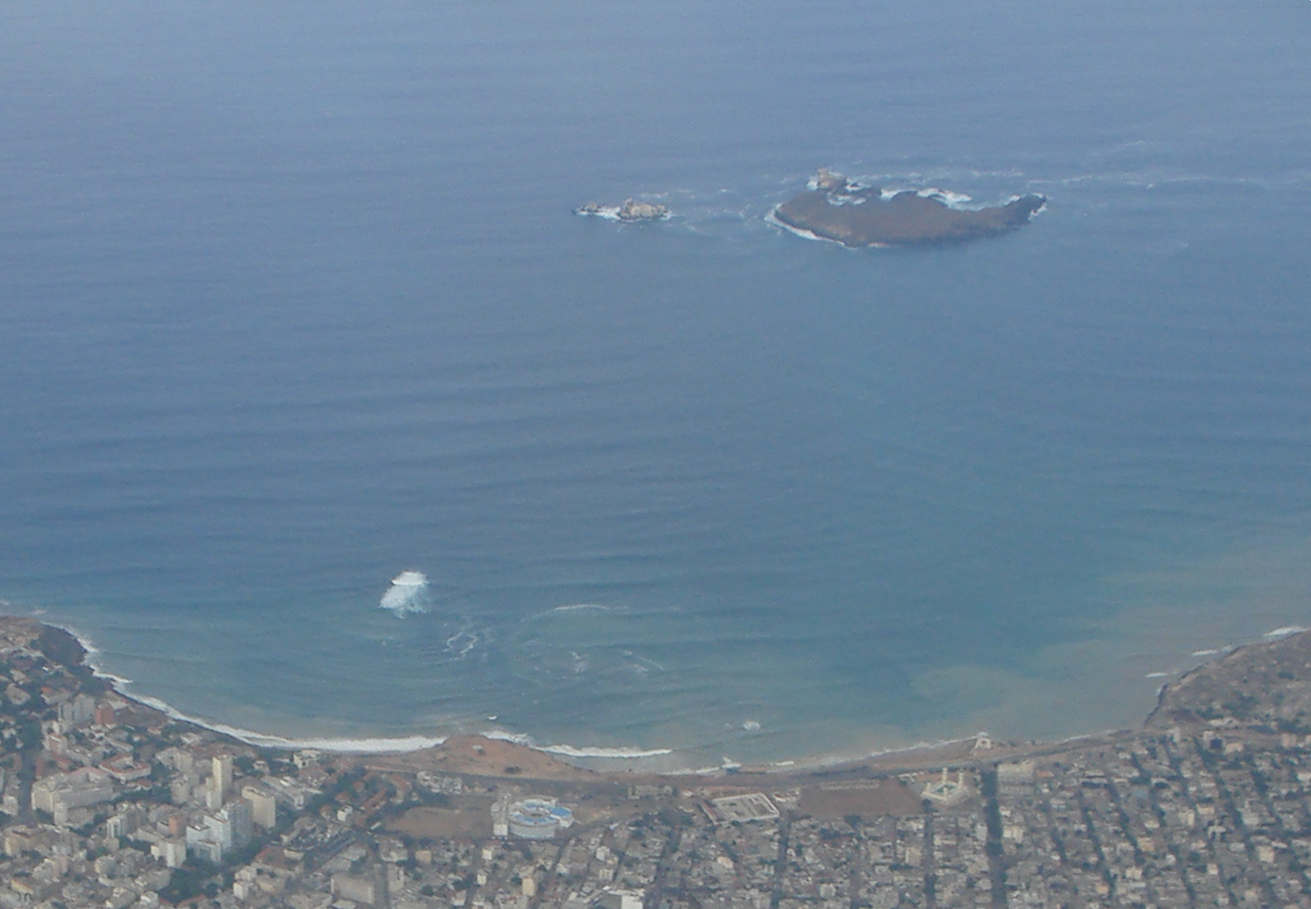
Îles de la Madeleine off the shore of Dakar

The Îles de la Madeleine (French pronunciation: [il də la madlɛn]) lie west of Dakar in Senegal. The islands are uninhabited. The main island is Sarpan, known for its Stone Age tool finds. The islands are also known for their birds, fish and plant life. The cliffs are steep, and had been carved by the sea over millions of years. Îles de la Madeleine National Park (French: Parc national des Îles de la Madeleine) is one of the smallest national parks in the world.

== Îles de la Madeleine National Park ==
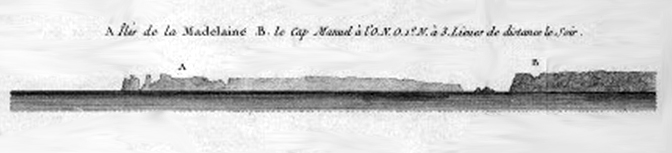
The Îles de la Madeleine and Cap Manuel, as seen "à trois lieues de distance le soir" by René Antoine Verdun de la Crenne

At just 0.45 km^{2} (110 acres), Le Parc National des Îles de la Madeleine is the smallest national park in the world, and a UNESCO World Heritage Tentative List site. Sarpan (Île aux Serpents), the largest of the islands, is home to breeding colonies of red-billed tropicbird, white-breasted cormorant, and bridled tern.

== Tree ==
When French naturalist Michel Adanson explored the islands in 1749, he claimed to have found a baobab that was 3.8 metres (12 ft) in diameter, which bore the carvings of passing mariners on its trunk, including those of Prince Henry the Navigator in 1444 and André Thevet in 1555. From this he concluded that the species was extraordinarily long-lived. When Théodore Monod searched the island in the 20th century, this tree was not to be found.

== See also ==
- List of islands of Senegal
- Deux Mamelles
