= Extreme points of Africa =

Geographical extremities of the African continent

The extreme points of Africa are the points that are further north, south, east or west than any other location on the continent.

== Latitude and longitude ==
Geographic coordinates expressed in WGS 84.

=== Africa ===
Africa

- Northernmost point — Iles des Chiens, Tunisia (37°32'N)
- Southernmost point — Cape Agulhas, South Africa (34°51'15"S). If the Prince Edward Islands are included in Africa, then Marion Island is the southernmost point at 46°54'S.
- Westernmost point — Santo Antão, Cape Verde Islands (25°25'W)
- Easternmost point — Rodrigues, Mauritius (63°30'E)

Africa (mainland)

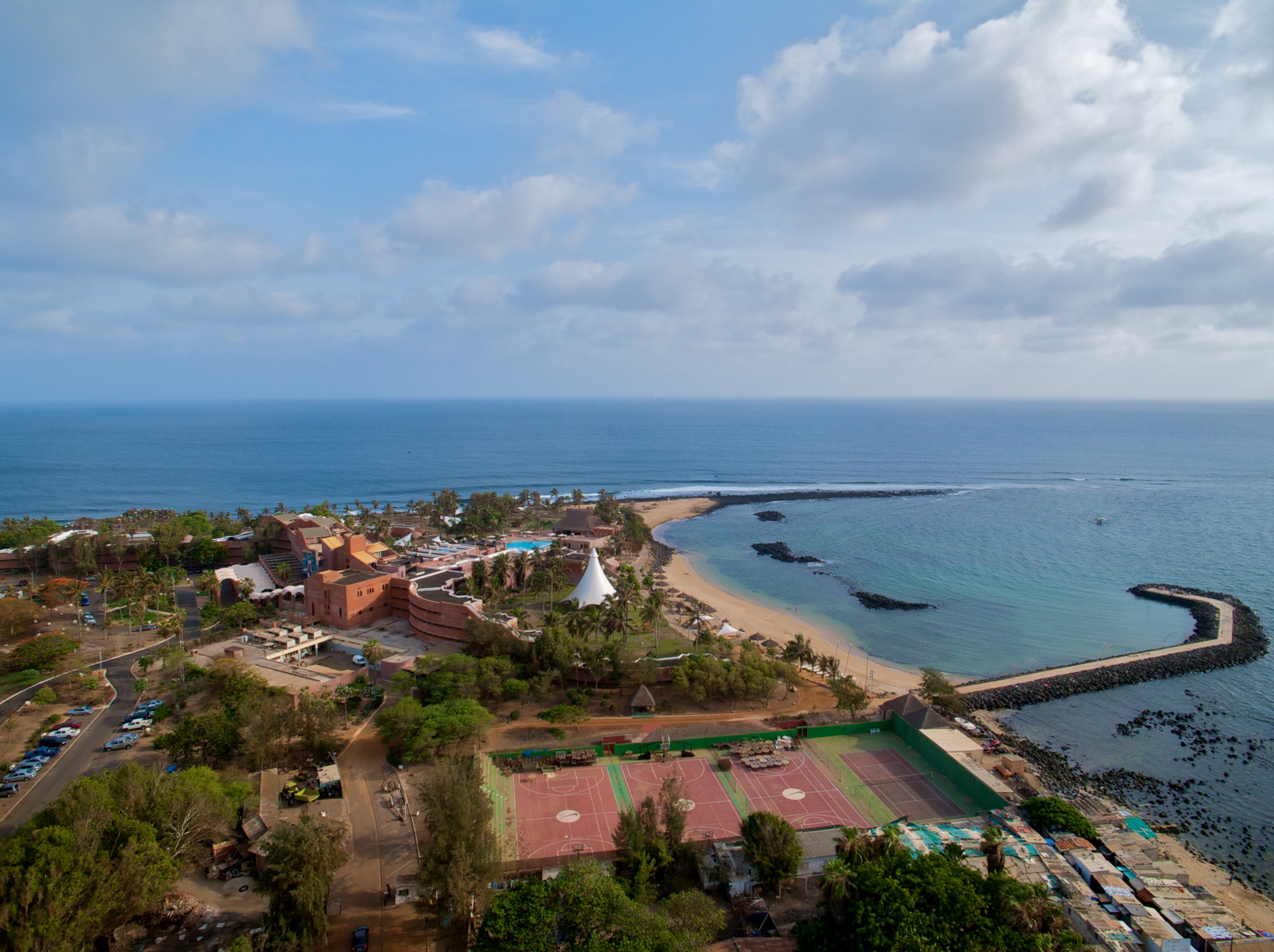
Westernmost Point (mainland) — Pointe des Almadies

- Northernmost point — Ras ben Sakka, Tunisia
- Southernmost point — Cape Agulhas, South Africa
- Westernmost point — Pointe des Almadies, Cap Vert Peninsula, Ngor, Dakar, Senegal (17°33'22"W)
- Easternmost point — Ras Hafun (Raas Xaafuun), Somalia (51°27'52"E)

Africa (centre)

- The African geographical centre is close to Epena, Republic of the Congo 2.07035°N 17.05291°E
- The African pole of inaccessibility is close to the borders of Central African Republic, South Sudan, and Democratic Republic of the Congo, near the town of Obo, Central African Republic.

=== Elevation ===
The highest point in Africa is Mount Kilimanjaro, 5,891.8 m (19,330 ft) in Tanzania. The lowest point is Lake Assal, 153 m (502 ft) below sea level, in Djibouti.

== See also ==
- Geography of Africa
- Extreme points of the Earth
