= African Renaissance Monument =

Statue located outside of Dakar, Senegal

African Renaissance Monument Monument de la Renaissance Africaine
- African Renaissance Monument
- Interactive map of African Renaissance Monument; Monument de la Renaissance Africaine
- Location: Ouakam, Dakar, Senegal
- Coordinates: 14°43′20″N 17°29′42″W
- Designer: Mansudae Overseas Projects
- Type: Statue
- Material: Bronze
- Height: 50 m (160 ft)
- Beginning date: 2008; 18 years ago
- Completion date: 2010; 16 years ago
- Opening date: 3 April 2010; 16 years ago

The African Renaissance Monument (French: Monument de la Renaissance Africaine) is a 50-metre (164 ft) tall bronze statue located on top of one of the twin hills known as Collines des Mamelles, outside Dakar, Senegal. Built overlooking the Atlantic Ocean in the Ouakam suburb, the statue was designed and built by Mansudae Overseas Projects, a monument construction company from North Korea, based on an initial sculptural model by the Romanian-French artist Virgil Magherusan and ideas proposed by the Senegalese President Abdoulaye Wade and artist Ousmane Sow. The Senegalese architect Pierre Goudiaby Atepa oversaw the project on behalf of Abdoulaye Wade.

Site preparation atop the 100-metre (330 ft) hill began in 2006, and construction of the bronze statue began in 2008. Originally scheduled for completion in December 2009, delays stretched into early 2010, and the formal dedication occurred on 4 April 2010, Senegal's "National Day", commemorating the 50th anniversary of the country's independence from France. It is the tallest statue in Africa.

== History and construction ==
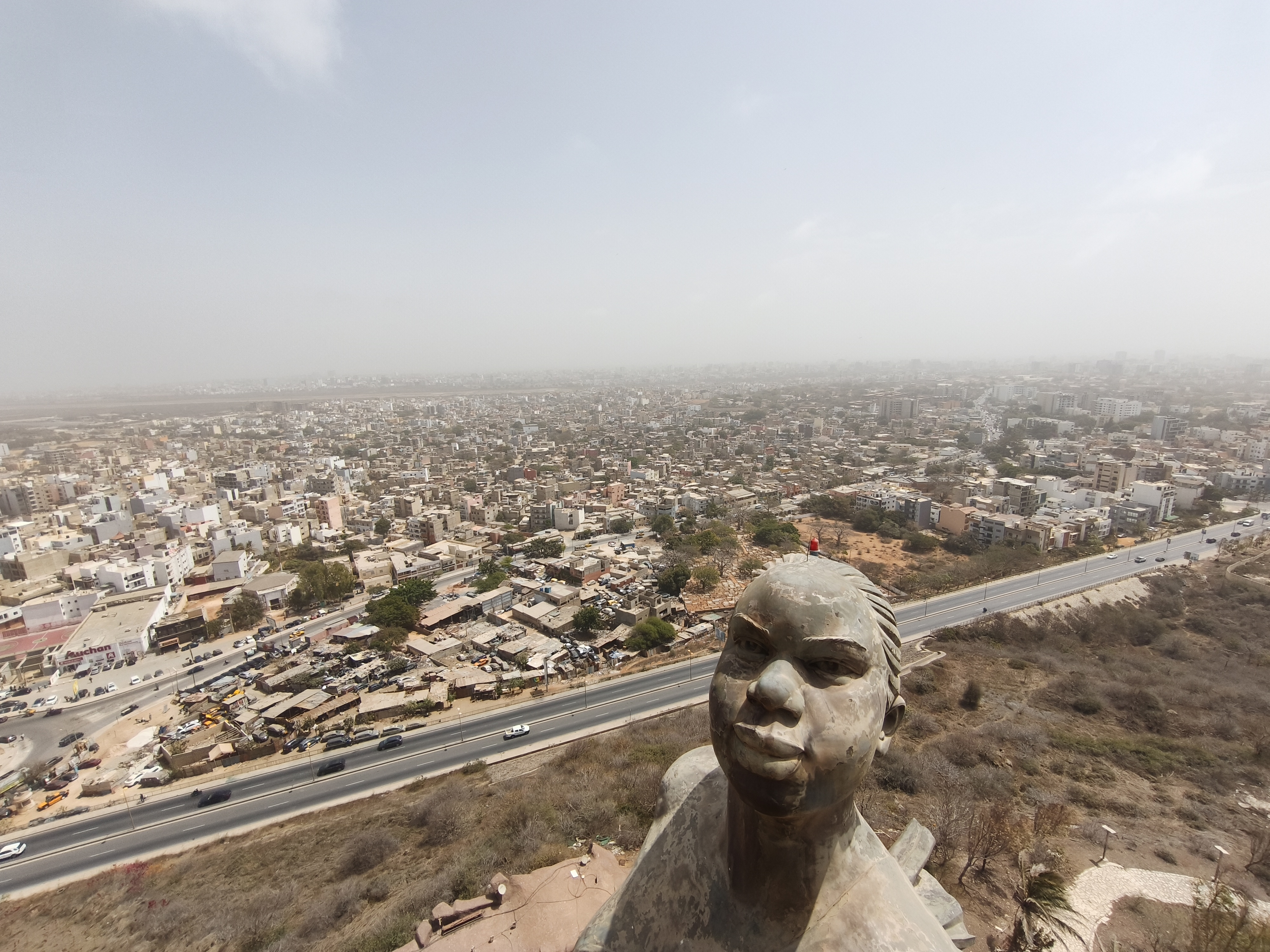
View of Dakar from top of the monument

The monument while being constructed

Abdoulaye Wade previously conceived of a monument in 1989, described in his book Un destin pour l’Afrique, which would have consisted of three figures representing Europe, the United States and Africa, with 'arms outstretched in a gesture of embrace'. In 1996 the artist Ousmane Sow suggested to Wade that he should build a monument at the Collines des Mamelles site. Sow envisioned 'figures emerging from a tunnel under the Atlantic', representing the return of the descendants of enslaved people to Africa, with another monument to be built in America. Though the final monument bears no resemblance to his original concept, Sow came up with the idea that it should feature a man, woman and child. In 2004 Abdoulaye Wade commissioned the artist Virgil Magherusan to create a model for the monument, with the idea that it should depict a couple with a child. Magherusan produced a 50cm tall bronze sculpture, representing the first concrete version of the design that would later become the African Renaissance Monument. However, Magherusan was never paid the fee for his work and instead the commission was given by Wade to the Mansudae Art Studio, who further developed the design, produced the architectural plan, and ultimately built the monument. Wade appointed the architect Pierre Goudiaby Atepa to supervise the project on his behalf, and both Wade and Atepa requested various changes to designs produced by the Mansudae studio as the project developed, including the demand that the statue should have "African heads, not Asian!". Construction began in 2008 and involved 150 North Korean workers and 50 Senegalese workers on the monument site.

== Unveiling ==
On 3 April 2010, the African Renaissance Monument was unveiled in Dakar in front of 19 African heads of state, including President of Malawi and the African Union, Bingu wa Mutharika, Jean Ping of the African Union Commission, and the Presidents of Benin, Cape Verde, Republic of the Congo, Ivory Coast, The Gambia, Liberia, Mali, Mauritania and Zimbabwe, as well as representatives from North Korea, and Jesse Jackson and musician Akon, both from the United States, all of whom were given a tour.

President Wade said, "It brings to life our common destiny. Africa has arrived in the 21st century standing tall and more ready than ever to take its destiny into its hands." President Bingu said, "This monument does not belong to Senegal. It belongs to the African people wherever we are."

== Controversies ==
=== Authorship ===
In 2008 Abdoulaye Wade secured a patent in several countries for some simple sketches which he claimed to be his 'designs' for the monument, though it later emerged that these were based on Magherusan's original model. Wade has subsequently claimed to be the sole designer of the monument, though all of the technical design and architectural work was performed by the Mansudae studio, and the finished statue bears many stylistic and technical characteristics that are typical of the Mansudae studio's work, as well as generally conforming to the studio's 'Stalinist' genre of monumental sculpture. The artist Ousmane Sow has accused Abdoulaye Wade of lying and of stealing his ideas for personal gain, including claiming 35% of the revenue generated by the monument 'under the pretext that he was its creator'.

In a 2011 interview Virgil Magherusan criticised the final form of the monument, "railing against its disfigured proportions improperly scaled from his original maquette, as well as "the 'orientalization' of the figures".

Although Pierre Goudiaby Atepa has often been described in media sources as the designer or architect of the monument, his actual role was that of supervisor, monitor or coordinator of the project, which included requesting changes to designs produced by the Mansudae studio in line with Abdoulaye Wade's 'vision'. During construction Atepa is reported to have advocated covering the female figure’s legs in response to backlash from the Muslim community, though in the end no such changes were made. In an interview given by Atepa to Arte TV in 2010 Atepa praised the complex internal structure devised by the North Korean studio and noted the 'Stalinian' aesthetic of the statue.

=== Expense ===
Thousands of people protested against "all the failures of President Wade's regime, the least of which is this horrible statue" on the city's streets beforehand, with riot police deployed to maintain control. Deputy leader of the opposition Ndeye Fatou Toure described the monument as an "economic monster and a financial scandal in the context of the current [economic] crisis".

The colossal statue has been criticized for its cost at US$ 27 million (£16.6m). The payment was made in kind, with 30 to 40 hectares of land that has variously been reported as sponsored by a Senegalese businessman or state-owned land.

=== Style ===
The statue was built by Mansudae Overseas Projects, a North Korean sculpting company famous for various projects and large statues throughout Africa since the 1970s.

The statue was poorly received by art critics around the world after its much-delayed unveiling in 2010 and was compared by some to the (once-abandoned) Christopher Columbus statue project that was unveiled in Arecibo, Puerto Rico in 2016. Local imams argued that a statue depicting a human figure is idolatrous and objected to the perceived immodesty of the semi-nude male and female figures.

Ousmane Sow, a world-renowned Senegalese sculptor, also objected to the use of foreign builders, saying it was anything but a symbol of African Renaissance and nothing to do with art.

=== Revenue ===
The project has also attracted controversy due to Wade's claim to the intellectual property rights of the statue, and insisting that he is entitled to 35 percent of the profits raised. Opposition figures have sharply criticised Wade's plan to claim intellectual property rights, insisting that the president cannot claim copyright over ideas conceived as a function of his public office.

== Gallery of images ==
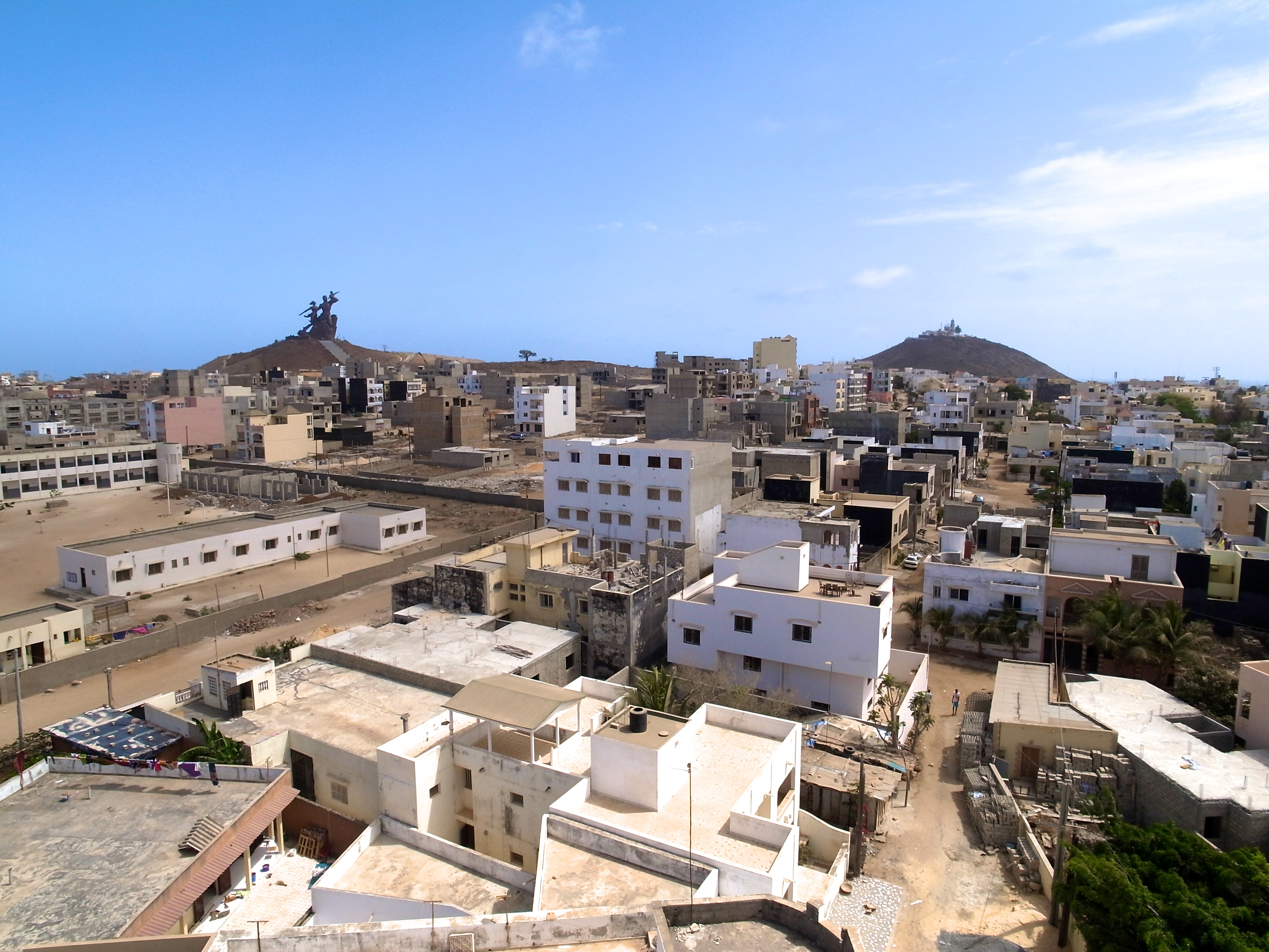
Monument as seen from afar, 12 June 2011

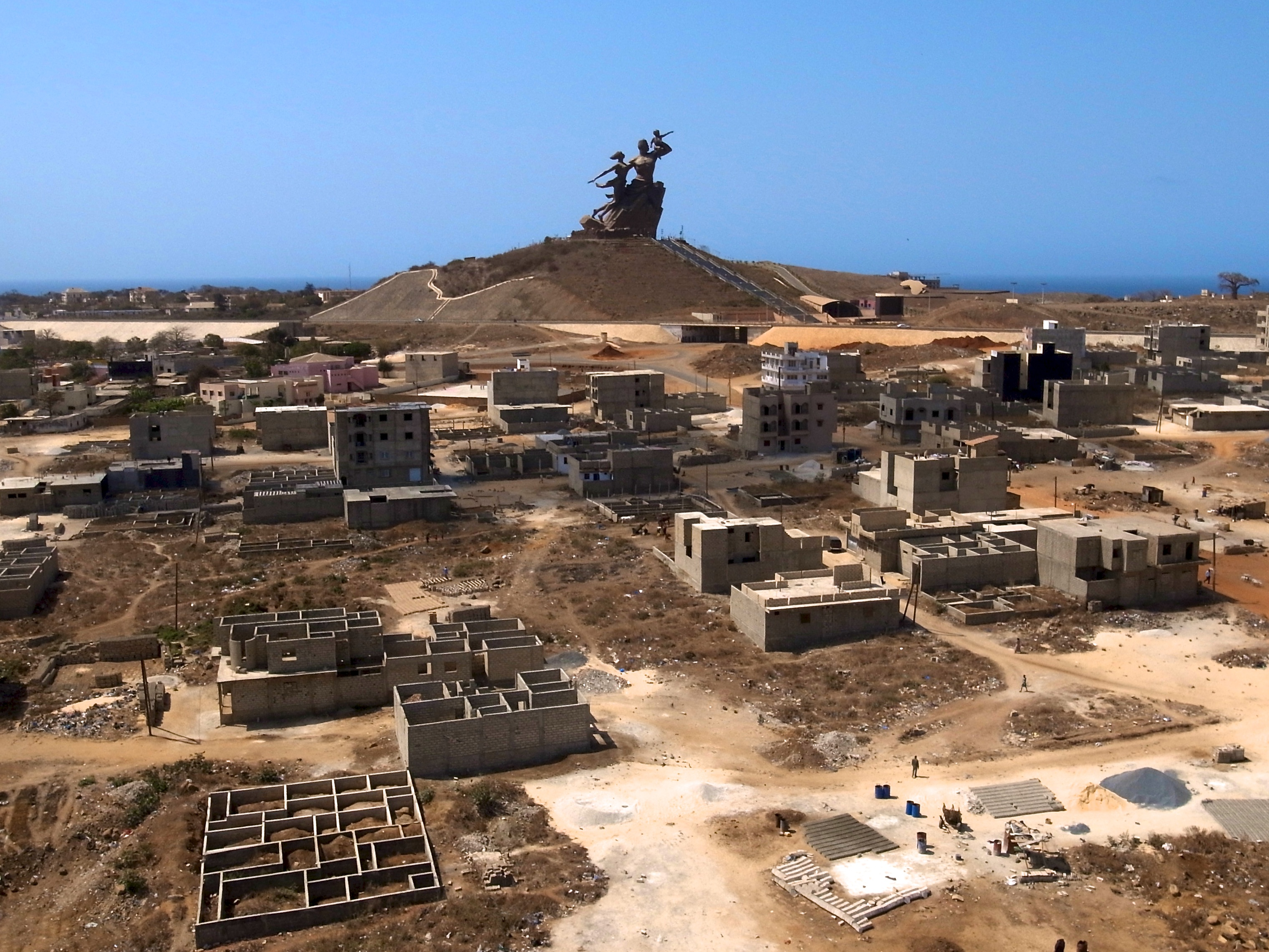
Buildings in the immediate vicinity of the monument, 6 March 2011

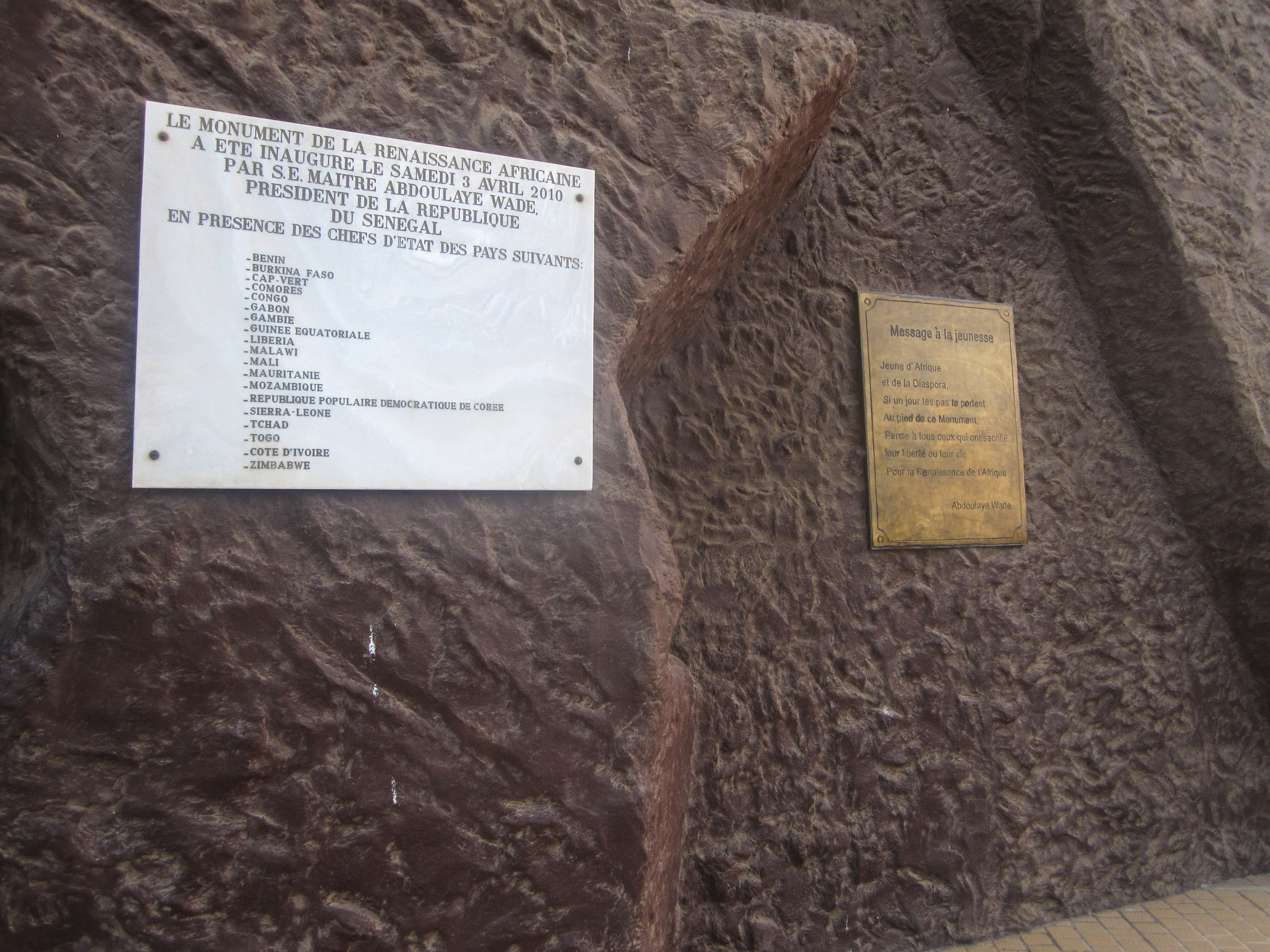
Plaques at the base of the statue

Adjacent to the central figure of the monument is a woman standing beside the man

The central figure of the monument depicts a muscular man holding a child aloft with one hand while stretching the other arm outward

The child, held aloft by the central male figure of the African Renaissance Monument, faces outward with arms raised upward

View from base of stairs

Monument seen from above

View from monument base

Looking up from below

Sign at monument base

Tourists ascending stairs

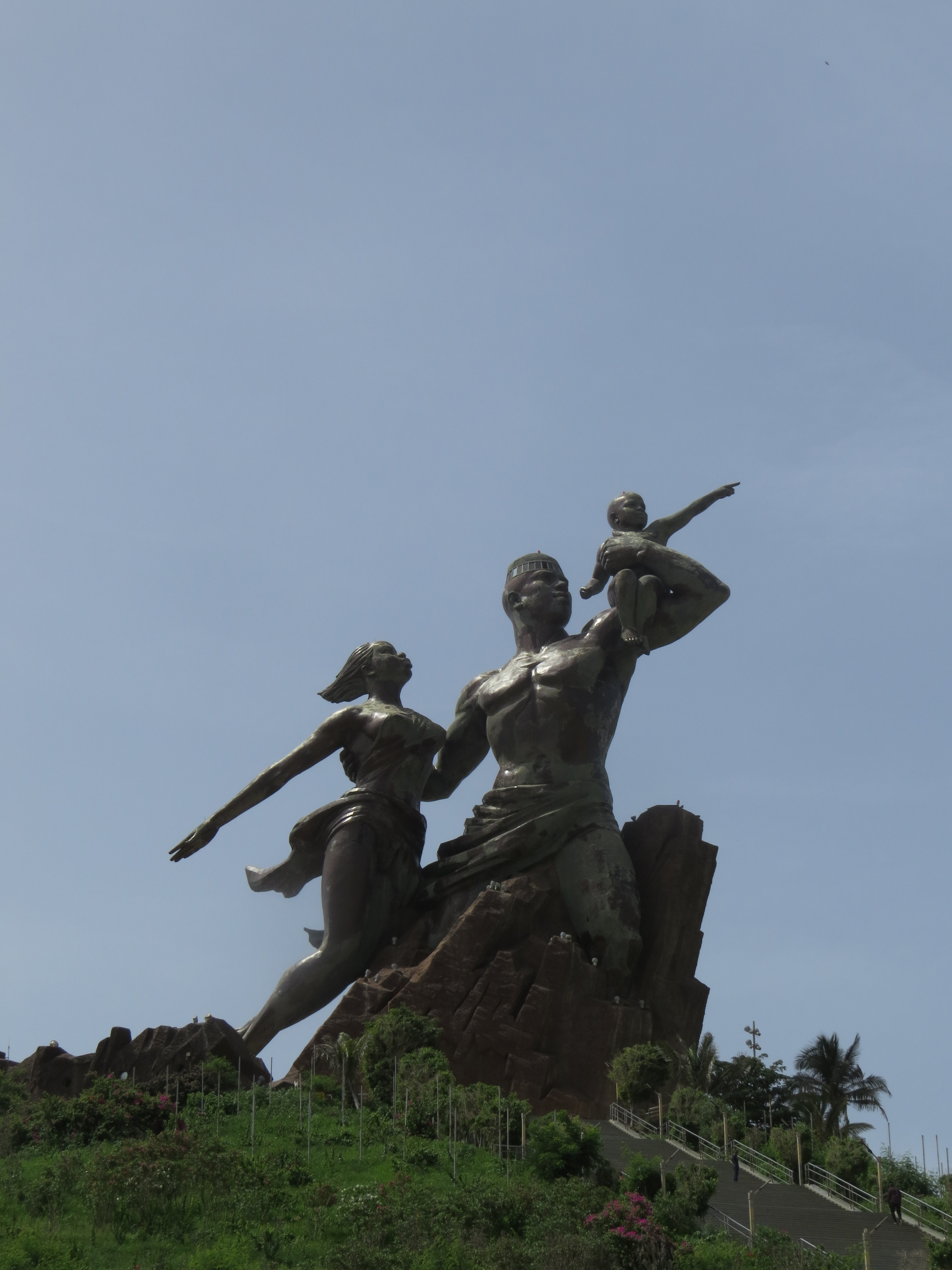
Seen from street below in 2025 during the rainy season

== See also ==
- African Renaissance
- Mansudae Overseas Projects
- List of tallest statues
- Sungbo's Eredo
