= Mosque of Divinity =

Mosque in Ouakam, Dakar, Senegal

- مسجد اللاهوت; Mosquée de la Divinité

- Location within Senegal

Religion
- Affiliation: Sunni Islam
- Ecclesiastical or organizational status: Mosque
- Status: Active

Location
- Location: Ouakam, Dakar
- Country: Senegal
- Interactive map of Mosque of Divinity
- Coordinates: 14°42′57″N 17°29′26″W

Architecture
- Architect: Cheikh Ngom
- Type: Mosque
- Completed: 1997

Specifications
- Minaret: 2
- Minaret height: 45 m (148 ft)

The Mosque of Divinity (Arabic: مسجد اللاهوت; French: Mosquée de la Divinité) is a mosque located in Ouakam, Senegal. Completed in 1997, the mosque has two minarets and provides a view of the Atlantic Ocean, as it is located near the Corniche-Ouest shore.

== Overview ==
The original idea to build the mosque first came from Mohamed Gorgui Seyni Guèye. He came up with the idea in 1973. However, the actual building was built by Cheikh Ngom, and wasn't completed until 1997.

The twin minarets are 45 metres (148 ft) tall.

== See also ==
- Islam in Senegal
- List of mosques in Senegal
