= Cabo Verde (disambiguation) =

Cape Verde, in Portuguese Cabo Verde, is an island country in West Africa.

Cabo Verde may also refer to:

- Cap-Vert, in Portuguese Cabo Verde, peninsula in Senegal
- Cabo Verde, Minas Gerais, Brazilian municipality in the southwest of the state of Minas Gerais
- Cabo Verde (album), 1997, by the Cape Verdean singer Cesária Évora
- Cabo Verde Express, Cape Verdean airline

== See also ==
- Cape Verde (disambiguation)
