= Massalikoul Djinane Mosque =

Mosque in Dakar, Senegal

- Mosquée Massalikoul Djinane

- Location within Senegal

Religion
- Affiliation: Islam
- Ecclesiastical or organizational status: Mosque
- Status: Active

Location
- Location: Dakar
- Country: Senegal
- Interactive map of Massalikoul Djinane Mosque
- Coordinates: 14°42′04″N 17°26′55″W

Architecture
- Type: Mosque
- General contractor: Consortium des Entreprises du Sénégal
- Completed: 2019
- Construction cost: XOF20 billion

Specifications
- Capacity: 30,000 worshipers
- Interior area: 10,000 m^{2} (110,000 sq ft)
- Dome: 4
- Dome height (outer): 28 m (92 ft)
- Minaret: 5
- Minaret height: 80 m (260 ft)

The Massalikoul Djinane Mosque (French: Mosquée Massalikoul Djinane) is a mosque in Dakar, Senegal.

== Overview ==
In the early 2000s, the land where the mosque stands today was donated by President Abdoulaye Wade. The construction by Consortium des Entreprises du Sénégal took place over approximately 15 years and the mosque was opened on 27 September 2019.

The mosque spans over 10,000 square metres (110,000 sq ft), making it the largest mosque in West Africa, that can accommodate up to 10,000 worshipers inside the prayer hall and additional 20,000 in its sahn. It consists of five minarets, each 80 metres (260 ft) high and four 28-metre-tall (92 ft) wooden domes. The construction cost was XOF20 billion.

== See also ==
- Islam in Senegal
- List of mosques in Senegal
