= Cabo Corrientes =

Cabo Corrientes may refer to:

- Cabo Corrientes Municipality, a municipality in Jalisco, Mexico
  - Cabo Corrientes, Jalisco, a cape in Jalisco, Mexico
- Cabo Corrientes, Chocó, a cape on the Pacific coast of Colombia
- Cabo Corrientes, Cuba, a cape in the extreme west of Cuba
- Cabo Corrientes, Mar del Plata, a cape in Argentina
- Cabo Corrientes, Malvinas, the Spanish name for Cape Carysfort on East Falkland

== See also ==
- Cape Correntes, a cape in Mozambique, sometimes referred to as "Cape Corrientes"
