= Ouakam =

Coordinates: 14°43′26″N 17°29′21″W

- Commune d'arrondissement
- Mosque of Divinity in Ouakam

- Ouakam location
- Country: Senegal
- Region: Dakar Region
- Department: Dakar Department

Area
  - Total: 5 km^{2} (1.9 sq mi)

Population (2013)
  - Total: 74,692
  - Density: 15,000/km^{2} (39,000/sq mi)
- Time zone: UTC+0 (GMT)

Ouakam is a commune d'arrondissement in the city of Dakar, Senegal. The commune is the birthplace of French politicians Ségolène Royal and Rama Yade and Senegalese writer and politician Birago Diop. Ouakam is one of the four original Lebou villages of the Cap-Vert Peninsula, along with Yoff, Ngor, and Hann.

== Description ==
Ouakam is an ancient village that has since been absorbed as a residential suburb of Dakar. It is situated on the Atlantic coast at the foot of a range of hills, the Deux Mamelles, Ouakam has two beaches, one of which is popular among surfers.

According to the 2013 census, the commune of Ouakam comprised 74,692 people.

The Mosque of Divinity was built by Mohamed Gorgui Seyni Guèye (1926–2007), a holy man who claimed to see the mosque in a dream. He followed the dream to the beach on June 28, 1973, where he received an order from the Lord to build it. The African Renaissance Monument was constructed on one of the Deux Mamelles hills in Ouakam and was unveiled on April 4, 2010.

== Economy ==
African Renaissance Monument

The village of Ouakam is home to the Lebou people, many of whom are fishermen. In the colonial era, Senegalese riflemen were garrisoned at Ouakam, while today the community is home to several military encampments such as the National Military Academy, a French Army air base, and a Senegalese Air Force base. Ouakam is also a tourist center, especially with the construction of the new African Renaissance Monument.

== Sports ==
Its chief football clubs are US Ouakam and Entente Sotrac.

== Famous individuals born in Ouakam ==
- Mouhamed Gorgui Seyni Gueye, builder of the Madjidoul Rabani Mosque near the beach
- Birago Diop, writer
- Ségolène Royal, French politician, was born on the military base at Ouakam where her father, Jacques Royal, was an artillery colonel
- Rama Yade, French politician and Secretary of State for Sports

== Sources ==
- (in English) C. T. Mbengue, An Introduction to the Traditional Villages of Yoff, Ngor and Ouakam, in R. Register and B. Peeks (under the direction of), Village wisdom, future cities, 1996, Third international conference Écoville-Écovillage (Yoff, Sénégal), Ecocity Builders, Oakland, California, pp. 82–85
- (in French) Germaine Françoise Bocandé, L’implantation militaire française dans la région du Cap-Vert : causes, problèmes et conséquences des origines à 1900, Dakar, University of Dakar, 1980, 112 p. (Masters Thesis)
