= Cabo Wabo (disambiguation) =

Cabo Wabo is an American restaurant, nightclub, and bar company.

Cabo Wabo may also refer to:

- Cabo Wabo 250, a NASCAR Xfinity race from 1992 to 2024
- "Cabo Wabo", a song from Van Halen's 1988 album OU812
