= Gade people =

Ethnic group in Nigeria

Gade people, are one of the ethnic groups in Nigeria. They can be found in Kano State, Kogi State, Lagos State, Jigawa State, Niger State, Kwara State, Niger State, the Federal Capital Territory (Abuja) and Nassarawa State.

== Coded Names ==
Importantly, The Gade Native speaker is called Byẹ̀nī or simply ubyeni and the Gade language is called Rìbyẹ̀ which is literally mean Phonetics. A Gademan/Gadewoman is called Byēní. Ụbyēní/Ụbyēnú is used when referring to the Gademan/Gadewoman while Bàbyẹ̀ is the plural form of byēní.

== Linguistic ==
The Gadé language belongs to Gadoid language Classification Scheme.

== Gade Legal System ==
The Supreme Court in Gade Nations is called Ụdáá gbòngbòńkí headed by the Gómó and some Bátsákpá during proceedings and the system of Administration or Governance in Gade Nations is called a constitutional monarchy in a confederate society.

== Present Country ==
Gade can be found in Niger State, FCT Abuja, Nasarawa State, Kogi State, Benue State, Kaduna State, Jigawa State, Kwara State and Oyo State. The Gade in Kaduna State, Jigawa State, Kwara State and Oyo State (D.T. Adalkhali, 2017) had since relegated the speaking of Gade language but they identified themselves as Gade. (GT Obadiah, 2023).

== Language ==
Gade people speak Gade language. and there are three dialects of Gadé Language namely; Bàpọ̀nụ́ dialect, Northern dialect and Southern dialect. The linguistic classification of the Gadé language is Gadoid Language classification scheme and not Nupoid Language

== Annual Gade Cultural Festival ==
This is an annual festival where the Gade people from far and near gathered to celebrate their culture and belief. The annual Gade Festival came into existence around the 10th century A.D. The first Annual Festival was held in Keffi with cultural troops from all the Gade Communities in their Ádákpụ́, Zịzí Nūbá, Bégu, nbó, magicians (Rubochi), just to mention but a few. This is out of the gap as various Gadé Communities are engaged with their domestic cultural Identity and integration. The festival involves the display of cultural antiquities such as; Adakpu, War Music, Masquerade of different functions.
