= Grand Mosque of Dakar =

Mosque in Dakar, Senegal

- المسجد الكبير في داكار; Grande Mosquée de Dakar

- Location within Senegal

Religion
- Affiliation: Sunni Islam
- Ecclesiastical or organizational status: Mosque
- Status: Active

Location
- Location: Dakar
- Country: Senegal
- Interactive map of Grand Mosque of Dakar
- Coordinates: 14°40′40″N 17°26′32″W

Architecture
- Type: Mosque
- Completed: 1964

Specifications
- Minaret: 1
- Minaret height: 67 m (220 ft)

The Grand Mosque of Dakar (Arabic: المسجد الكبير في داكار; French: Grande Mosquée de Dakar) is a mosque in Dakar, Senegal, situated on Allée Pape Gueye Fall, in the Dakar médina.

== Overview ==
Designed by Moroccan and French architects, the Dakar Grand Mosque was opened in 1964 by Hassan II, King of Morocco and Senegalese President Léopold Sédar Senghor.

The mosque's minaret is 67 metres (220 ft) tall. With richly decorated interior and exterior, the Dakar Grand Mosque is stylistically similar to the Mausoleum of Mohammed V in Rabat.

== Islamic Institute of Dakar ==
Created in 1964 and situated in the enceinte of the mosque, the Islamic Institute is a public institution under the direction of the Senegalese Minister of Education, dedicated to Islamic research and teaching. The library of the Institute, named for prince Naef Ben Abdelaziz Al-Saoud was opened 9 October 2004.

== Gallery ==
The mosque's minaret

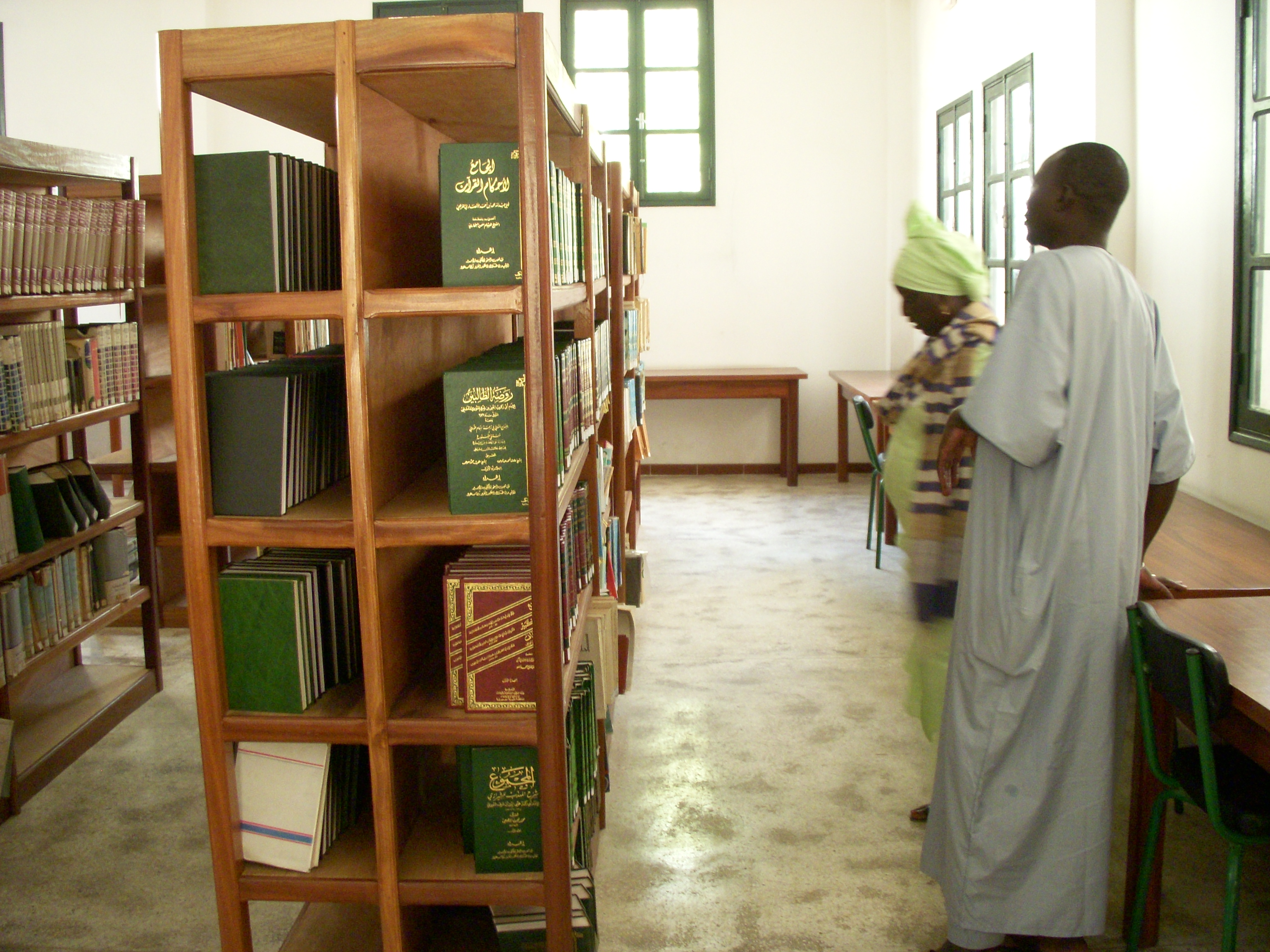
Library of the Institut islamique

== See also ==
- Islam in Senegal
- List of mosques in Senegal
