= Potassium aluminium borate =

Identifiers
CAS Number	88160-55-8
3D model (JSmol)	Interactive image
- InChI: InChI=1/2Al.B2O7.2K/c;;3-1(4,5)9-2(6,7)8;;/q2*+3;-8;2*+1 Key: LUZFBJMCIMUJDC-UHFFFAOYNA-N
- SMILES: [Al+3].[Al+3].[O-][B-]([O-])([O-])O[B-]([O-])([O-])[O-].[K+].[K+]

Properties
Chemical formula	K_{2}Al_{2}B_{2}O_{7}
- Except where otherwise noted, data are given for materials in their standard state (at 25 °C [77 °F], 100 kPa). verify (what is ?) Infobox references

Potassium aluminium borate (K_{2}Al_{2}B_{2}O_{7}) is an ionic compound composed of potassium ions, aluminium ions, and borate ions. Its crystal form exhibits nonlinear optical properties. The ultraviolet beam at 266 nm can be obtained by fourth harmonic generation (FGH) of 1064 nm Nd:YAG laser radiation through a nonlinear crystal K_{2}Al_{2}B_{2}O_{7} (KABO).
