= Cabo Rojo =

Cabo rojo, Spanish for "red cape", may refer to:

- Cabo Rojo, Dominican Republic, in Pedernales Province
- Cabo Rojo (Mexico), a coastal feature in the state of Veracruz
- Cabo Rojo, Puerto Rico, a municipality
- Cabo Rojo National Natural Landmark, a National Natural Landmark in Puerto Rico
- Cabo Rojo National Wildlife Refuge, Puerto Rico
