= Cap-Vert (volcano) =

Upwellings of magma in western Senegal

- Location within Senegal

Highest point
- Coordinates: 14.77°N 17.4°W

Cap-Vert is a volcanic field in Senegal with a surface of 100 square kilometres (39 sq mi). The field covers the Cape Verde peninsula close to Dakar and was active until 600,000 years ago. It consists of a number of outcrops and two 100 metres (330 ft) high hills. The position of the dykes and lava flows has been influenced by local fault systems.
