= Kabo Island =

Island in the Philippines

Kabo (Kabusgan) Island
- Location within Philippines

Geography
- Coordinates: 9°46′57″N 125°33′4″E
- Adjacent to: Hinatuan Passage; Philippine Sea
- Length: 1.2 km (0.75 mi)
- Width: .5 km (0.31 mi)
- Highest elevation: 33.5 m (109.9 ft)

Administration
- Philippines
- Region: Caraga
- Province: Surigao del Norte

Kabo (Kabusgan) Island is a small island off the coast of the main island of Mindanao; administratively, it is in Barangay Day-asan, Surigao City, Surigao del Norte, of the Caraga Region of the Mindanao island group of the Philippines. The island itself provides a simple livelihood to caretakers where they yield fruits of the island that were used for charcoal making and raw materials for copra in the region, not to mention the six spring waters that provide water to the island. The island is owned by the Calderon family in Surigao.

== Geography ==
Kabo (Kabusgan) Island lies 4.8 kilometres (3 mi) eastward across the bay from Surigao City. The island is irregular in shape, elongated along a northeast-southwest line. It rises to an elevation of 33.5 metres (110 ft). On the shoreside the mangroves form a brackish intermediate zone with no clear shoreline. On the Hintuan Passage side, the shore is generally clear-cut. There is a reef, the Kabo Reef, about a half kilometer north of the island that extends to the northeast and east of the island. Load Island is immediately to the south.
