= Ousmane Sow (sculptor) =

Senegalese sculptor

- Ousmane Sow by Candace Feit
- Born: 10 October 1935; Dakar, Senegal
- Died: 1 December 2016 (aged 81); Dakar, Senegal
- Awards: Prince Claus Award, 2008
- Elected: member of the Académie des Beaux-Arts, 2013
- Website: ousmanesow.com

Ousmane Sow (10 October 1935 – 1 December 2016) was a Senegalese sculptor of larger-than-life statues of people and groups of people.

== Life ==
Sow was born in Dakar, Senegal, on 10 October 1935. After the death of his father in 1956, he left Dakar to study in France, where he obtained a diploma in physiotherapy. He returned to Senegal after it became independent in 1960 and started a practice in physiotherapy. He later went back to France and practised there, but returned to Senegal in 1978.

He died in Dakar on 1 December 2016 at the age of 81.

== Work ==
Sow was inspired by photographs by Leni Riefenstahl of the Nuba peoples of southern Sudan, and from 1984 began to work on a series of larger-than-life sculptures of muscular Nuba wrestlers. To make them, he developed a series of new techniques and materials. They were shown at the Centre Culturel Français de Dakar in 1987. Sow later made series of sculptures of Maasai people, of Zulu people, of Peul or Fulani people, and, in the late 1990s, of Native Americans.

== Reception ==
Sow had many international exhibitions, including at documenta IX in Kassel in 1992, at Palazzo Grassi in Venice during the Biennale of 1995, and on the Pont des Arts in Paris in 1999.

In the 2008 Prince Claus Awards, on the theme of Culture and the human body, he was one of the eleven laureates.

On 11 April 2012 Sow was elected a Membre Associé Etranger ("foreign associate member") of the Académie des Beaux-Arts of the Institut de France, replacing Andrew Wyeth. He was the first black person to have been elected to membership.

== Further reading and viewing ==
- Yolande Josèphe (1993) Ousmane Sow: Sculpteur d'Afriques (film, 24'). Paris: Sésame productions; Ateliers de diffusion audiovisuelle. (VHS video)
- Jean Loup Pivin, Pascal Martin Saint Léon, Jean-Marc Tingaud (1995). Ousmane Sow: Sculptures. Paris: Editions Revue Noire. ISBN 9782909571140.
- Alain Mabanckou (1999). Ousmane Sow: La sculpture du spectacle. Présence Africaine (159): 211–214.
- [Ousmane Sow] (1999). Ousmane Sow: Pont des Arts, Paris, 20 mars – 20 mai 1999 (special number of Beaux Arts magazine). Paris: Beaux Arts SA. ISBN 2842783093.
- Jacques A. Bertrand, Béatrice Soulé ([2006]). Ousmane Sow. Arles : Actes Sud. ISBN 9782742762118
- Béatrice Soulé (2006). Ousmane Sow (film, 26'); Ousmane Sow, le soleil en face (film, 55'). Neuilly-sur-Seine: Le P'tit jardin; Paris: Actes Sud. (DVD video)
- Fabrice Hervieu-Wane (2008). Ousmane Sow: Sculpteur d'histoires. In: Fabrice Hervieu-Wane, Éric Maulavé (2008). Dakar l'insoumise. Paris: Éditions Autrement. ISBN 9782746711235. p. 24–29.
- Nicolas Michel (2009). Ousmane Sow, l'anartiste. Jeune Afrique (2525): 86–87.
- Béatrice Soulé, Christophe Humbert (2009). Même Ousmane Sow a été petit. Paris: Le P'tit Jardin. ISBN 9782951376830.
