= Pointe des Almadies =

Westernmost point of Senegal and the African mainland

- headland
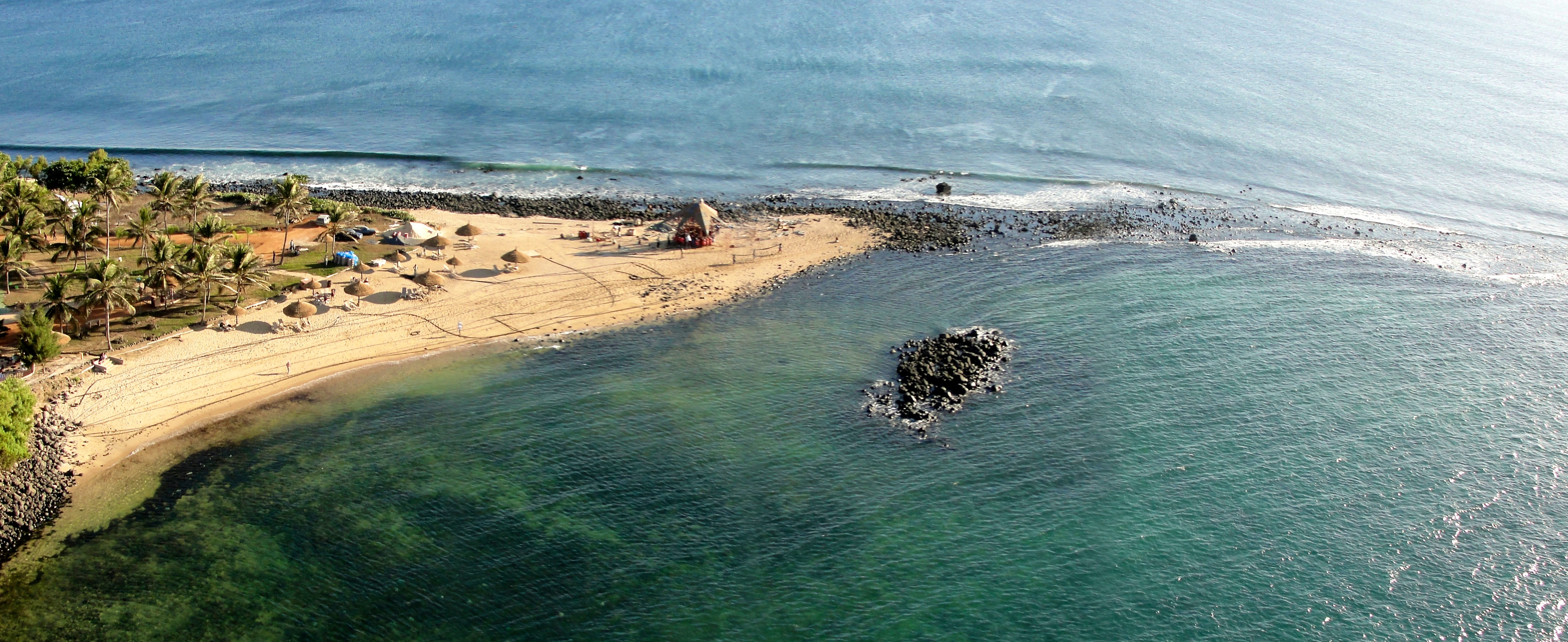

- Location within Afro-Eurasia Location within Africa Location within Senegal
- Coordinates: 14°44′27″N 17°31′48″W
- Elevation: 0 m (0 ft)

Pointe des Almadies or Point Almadies ([pwɑ̃t dez‿almadi] "bark canoe point") is the westernmost point on the continent of Africa and of the Afro-Eurasian landmass, lying at 17.5 degrees west of the Greenwich meridian, 8 degrees further west than Cabo da Roca, mainland Europe's westernmost point. Pointe des Almadies is located on the north-western end of the Cap Vert peninsula in Senegal.

== Environs ==
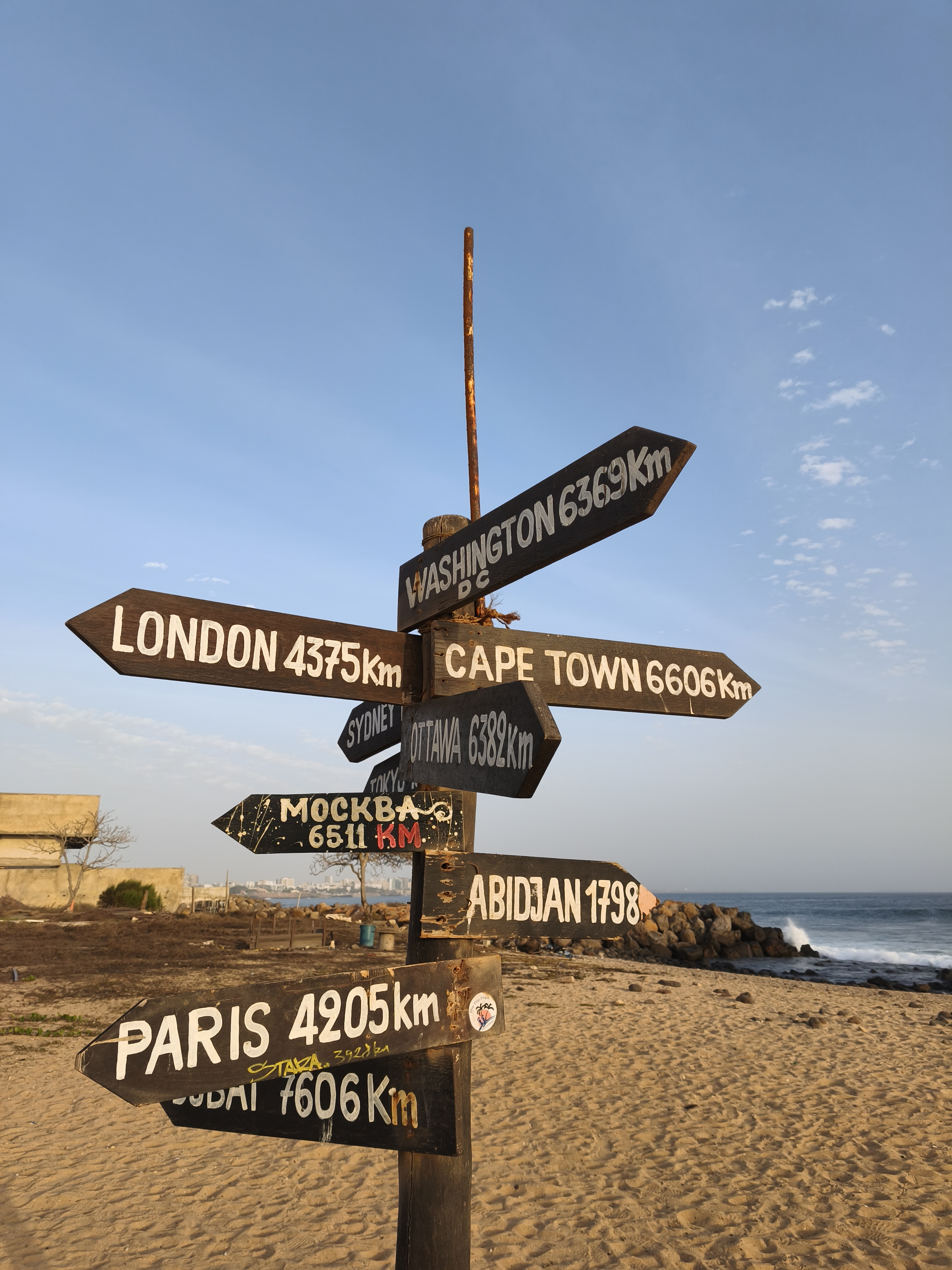
Sign on the beach north of Pointe des Almadies

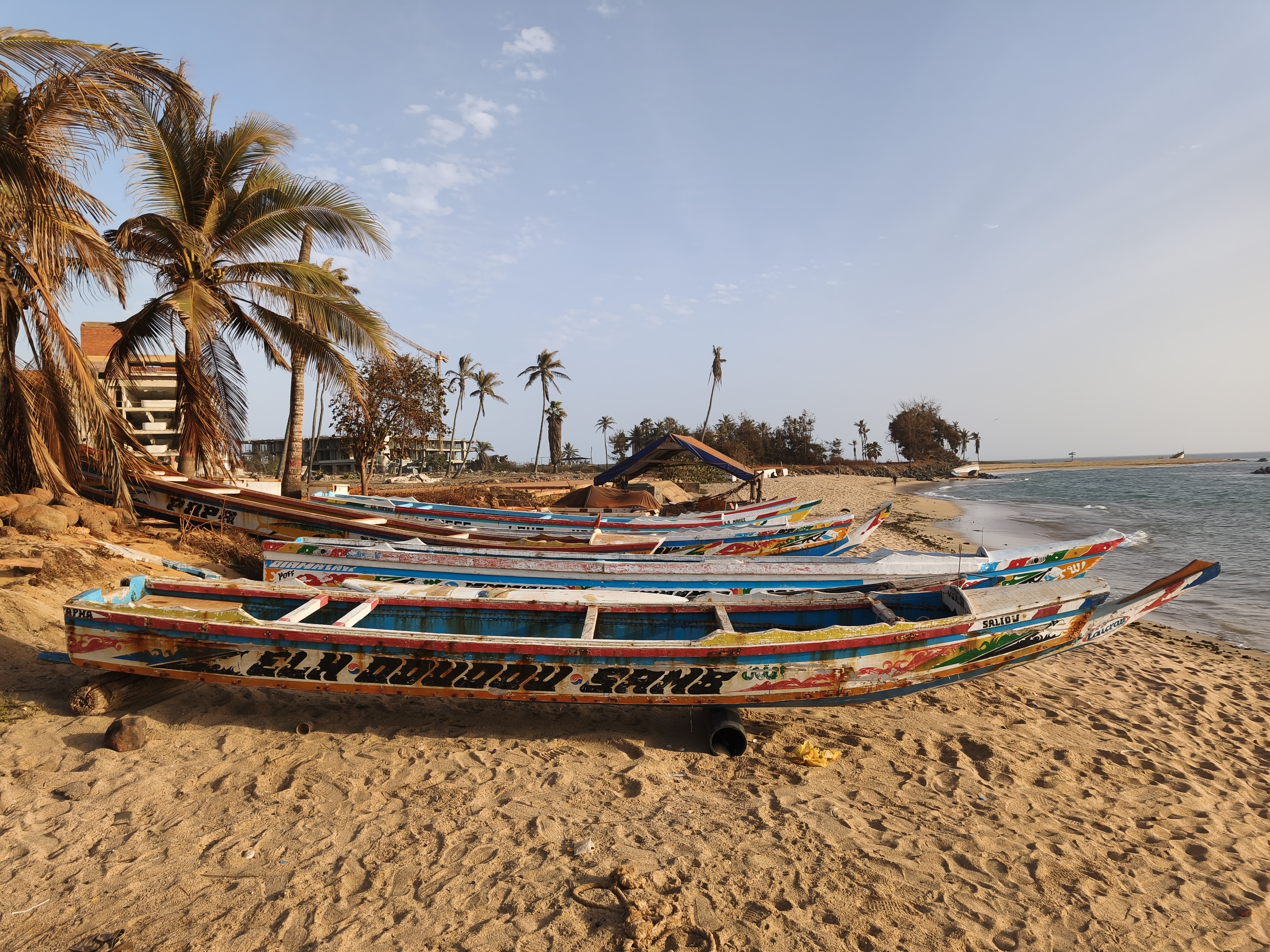
View of Pointe des Almadies

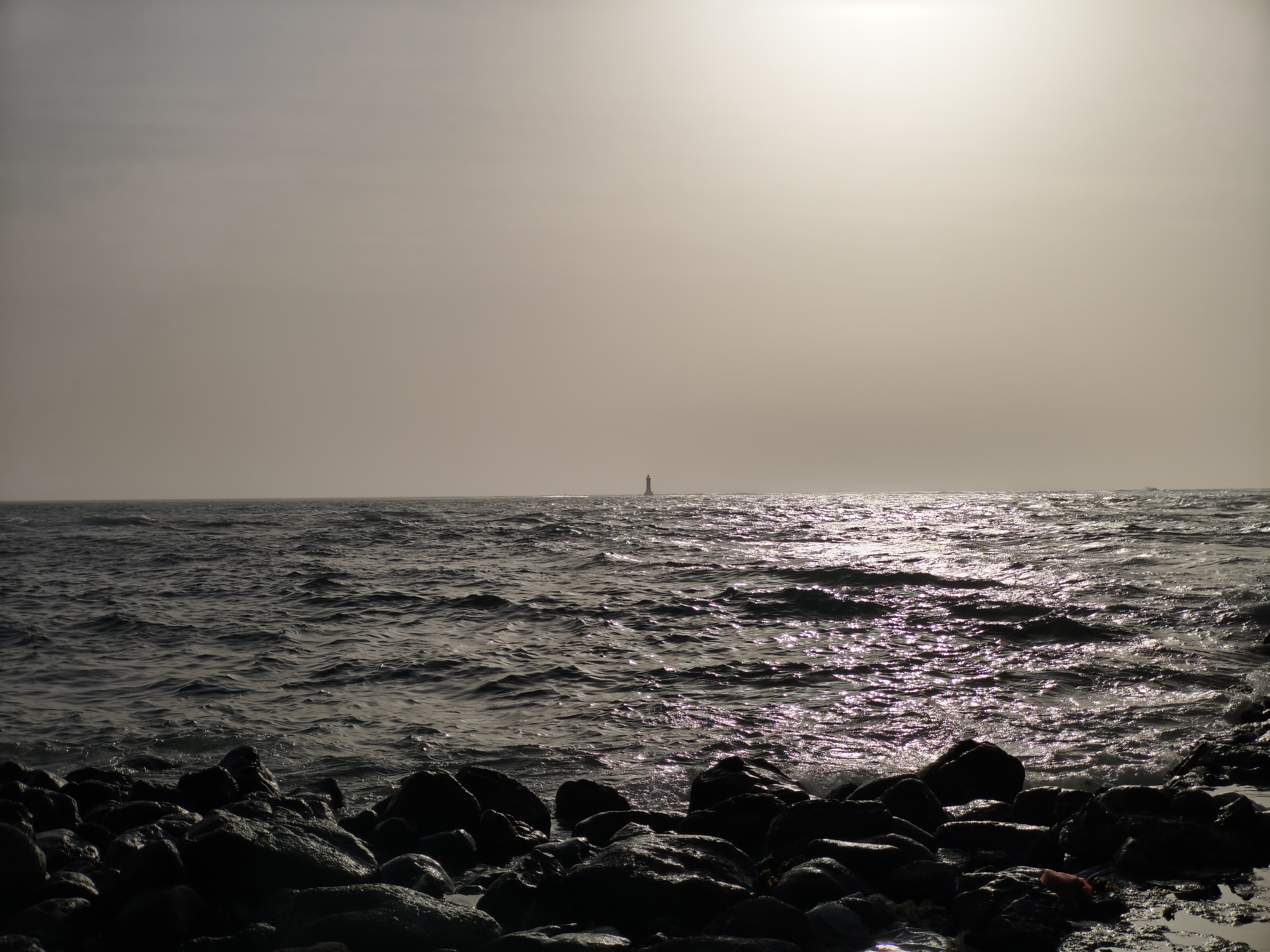
Sunset on Pointe des Almadies

Pointe des Almadies lies within the greater Dakar urban area from the village of N'gor and the town of Yoff.

Pointe des Almadies is a 30 minutes trip from downtown Dakar, Senegal's capital city, and is served by local transportation. The site itself is approximately five kilometres (3 mi) from the Dakar-Yoff-Léopold Sédar Senghor International Airport. The King Fahd Palace Hotel, the country's leading hotel and a major conference center, is located at Pointe des Almadies.

== Ecology ==
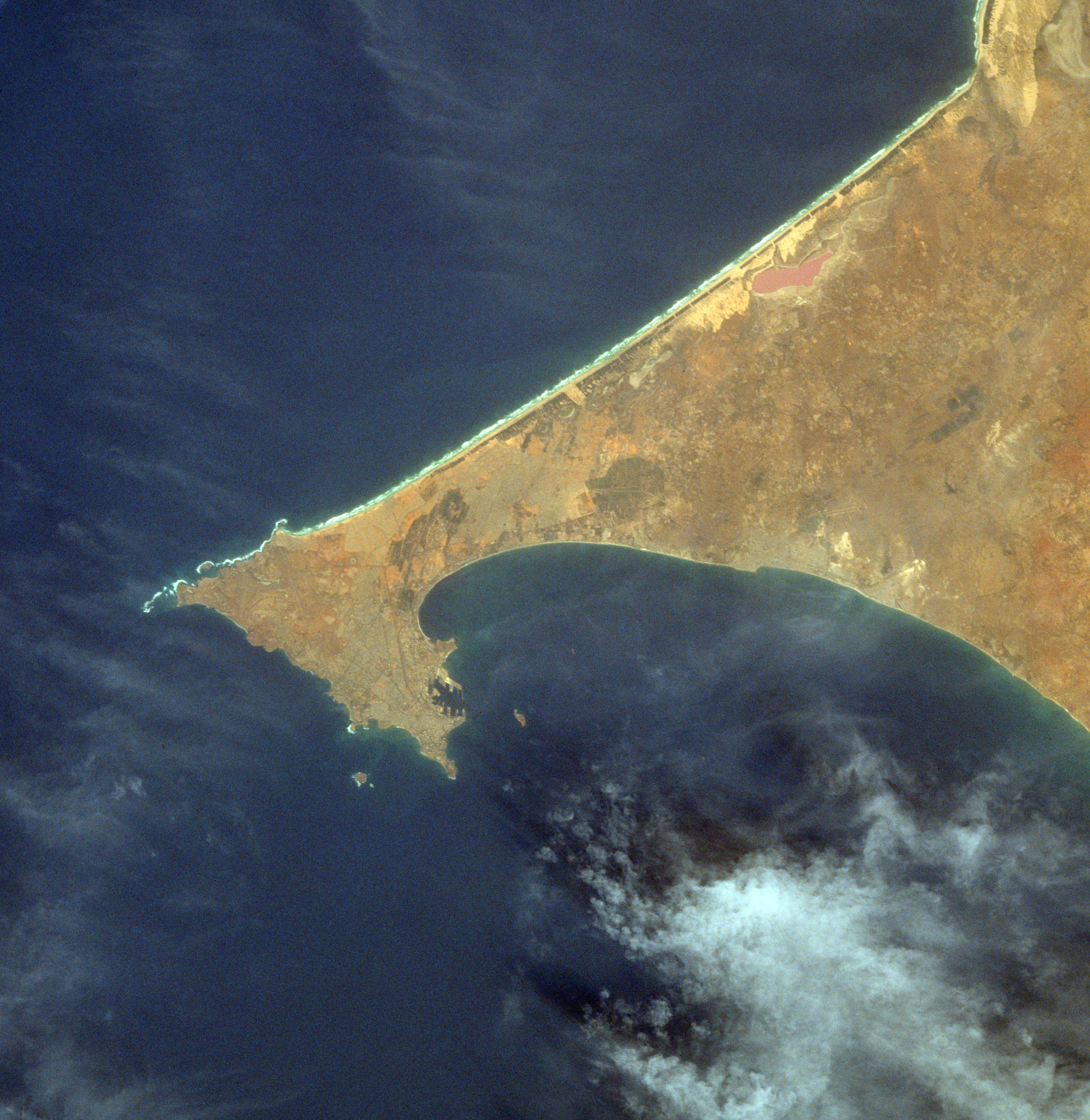
Satellite view

An oceanic front exists in the waters off Pointe des Allmadies. The waters of the equatorial northern flank are measurably warmer than the southern flank, with differences of 2 to 3 °C (3.5 to 5.5 °F). This causes differences in water chlorophyll levels, and resultant differences in fish abundance on different sides of the peninsula. The point is also a very good location for watching migratory seabirds

== Maritime boundary determination ==
Pointe des Almadies served an important role in a 1985 ruling that determined the maritime boundary between the nearby countries of Guinea and Guinea-Bissau. Both Guinea and Guinea-Bissau have short coastlines, so an international tribunal measured the general trend of the central West African coast from landmarks in the adjacent countries Senegal and Sierra Leone. Pointe des Almadies marks the north-western point of reference and Cape Schilling (8.172411°N 13.164539°W) in Sierra Leone marks the south-eastern point of reference. The maritime boundary between Guinea and Guinea-Bissau extends in a direction perpendicular to a line connecting the relative positions of these two landmarks.

== Surf ==
The Almadies peninsula was a featured location in the 1964 film The Endless Summer where Bruce Brown shot the film's stars Mike Hynson and Robert August at a reef near Pointe des Almadies. The best surfing in Senegal is on the peninsula, with locations within walking distance on both the north and south sides of the peninsula. Peak season is November through May.
