= Cap-Vert =

Headland in Senegal

Coordinates: 14°44′41″N 17°31′13″W

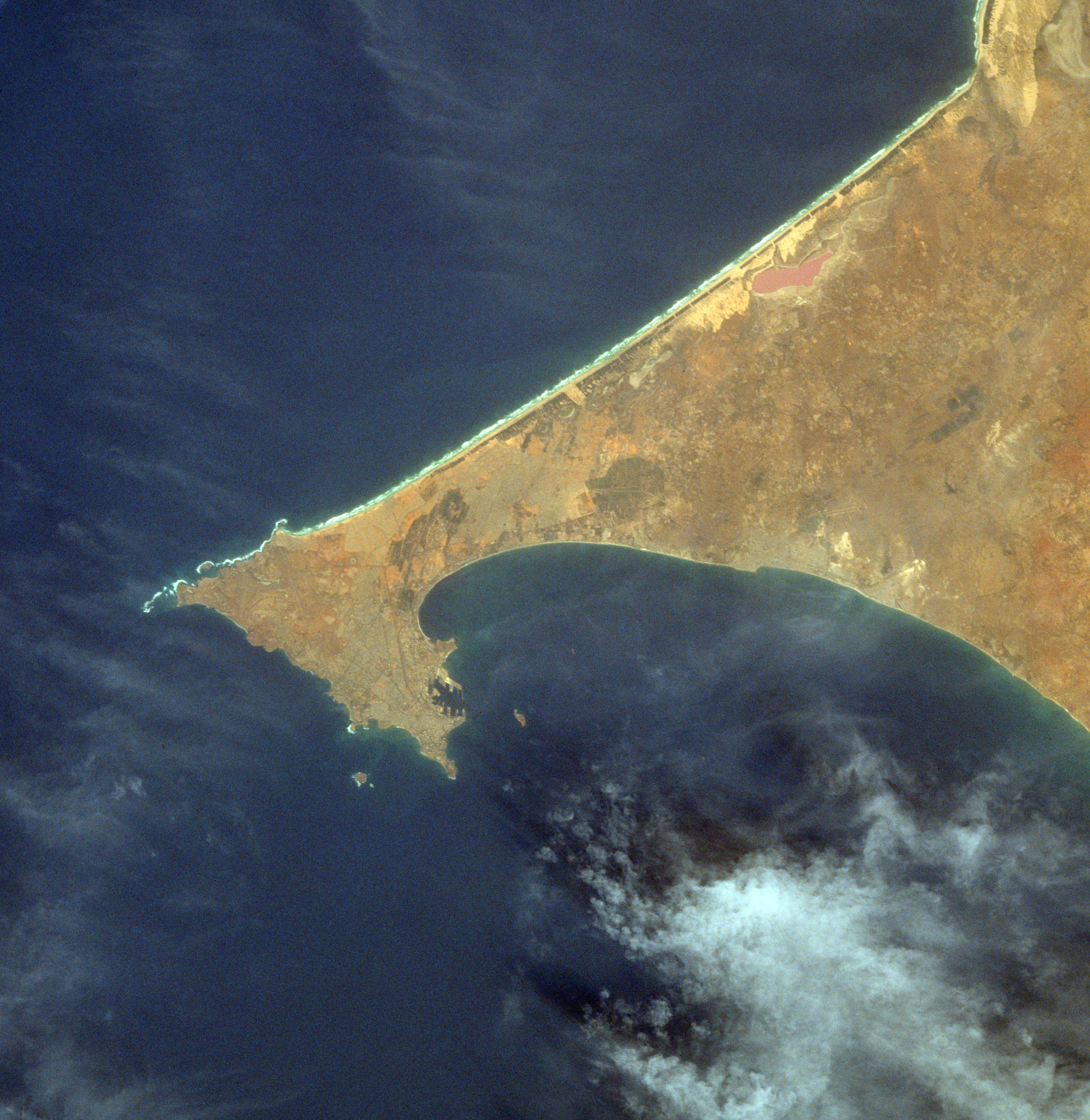
Satellite image of Cap-Vert

Cap-Vert (French for "Green Cape"; Wolof: Bopp bu Nëtëx) also known as the Cape Verde Peninsula (French: Presqu'île du Cap-Vert) to distinguish it from the nearby archipelagic country of Cape Verde, is a peninsula in Senegal and the westernmost point of the continent of Africa and of the Afro-Eurasia mainland. Portuguese explorers called it Cabo Verde or "Green Cape". The country of Cape Verde, located 570 kilometres (350 mi) farther west, is named in reference to the cape. Dakar, the capital of Senegal, occupies parts including its southern tip. The peninsula marks the border between Grande Côte to the north and Petite Côte to the south. It is delimited by two capes, Pointe des Almadies to the northwest and cap Manuel to the southeast.

The larger of the Deux Mamelles volcanic hills in Dakar is topped by Les Mamelles Lighthouse at its highest point.

== History ==
It is identified with the Hesperu Ceras (literally "western horn") mentioned by Classical Graeco-Roman authors as the westernmost point of the African continent.
