= Fugumba =

Place in Mamou Region, Guinea

Fougoumba Fugumba
- Sub-prefecture and town
- Location in Guinea
- Coordinates: 10°52′N 12°06′W
- Country: Guinea
- Region: Mamou Region
- Prefecture: Dalaba Prefecture

Population (2016)
  - Total: 14,293
  - Ethnicities: Fula
- Time zone: UTC+0 (GMT)

Fugumba, commonly spelled Fougoumba, is a town in central Guinea which was the religious center of the Imamate of Futa Jallon. It is about 30 miles (48 km) to the northwest of the former Imamate's secular capital, Timbo, and lies in the valley of the Téné River.

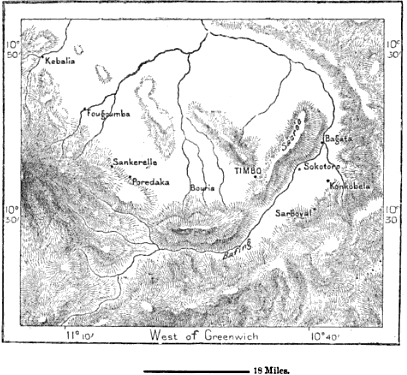
Timbo and the sources of the Bafing - Fougoumba to the northwest of the map

Fougoumba is the oldest Fula town in the Fouta Djallon, and the first whose chief converted to Islam. It was a place where marabouts and chiefs of the Fula people gathered to read and discuss the Quran, where the decision to launch a holy war against the infidels was decided in 1725, and where Karamokho Alfa was chosen to lead the jihad. In 1762 the king of Sankaran, Konde Burama, attacked the new state and was prevented from taking Fugumba with difficulty. The forces of Ibrahima Sory did not end the threat from Sankaran until 1776.

The Council of Elders of the Futa Jallon state were based in Fugumba, acting as a brake on the Almami, who headed the state. The Fulani built a large conical mosque in Fugumba, the first in the region. Fugumba had perhaps a thousand huts, and became the place where the newly chosen rulers of Futa-Jallon came to be consecrated. It was a center of Islamic learning. In the later political struggles of the state, Fugumba and Kolladé were the bases of the Alfaya faction, opposed to the more militarist Soriya faction that controlled Labé and Timbi.
