= Abdul Rahman Ibrahima Sori =

Guinean prince who had been enslaved

Abdulrahman Ibrahima ibn Sori
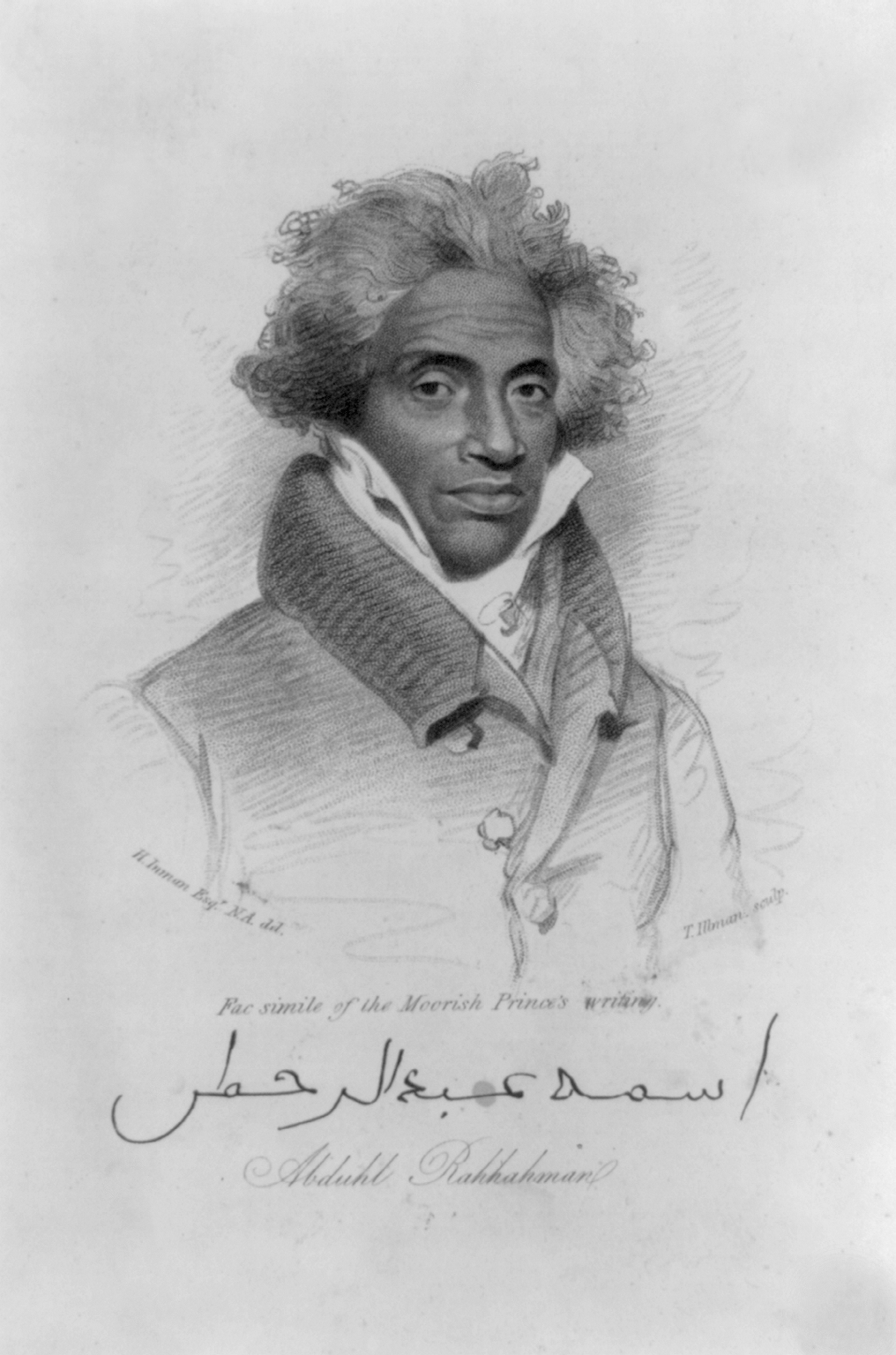
- Stipple engraving by Thomas Illman, after a portrait of Abdul Rahman Ibrahima ibn Sori drawn by Henry Inman; the Arabic inscription reads, "His name is Abd al-Rahman." (Library of Congress)
- Born: 1762; Timbuktu, Mali
- Died: July 6, 1829 (aged 67); Monrovia, Liberia
- Known for: American slave
- Office: Amir (military commander)
- Spouse: Isabella (m. 1794; died 1829)
- Father: Ibrahima Sori

Abdul Rahman Ibrahima ibn Sori (Arabic: عبد الرحمن ابراهيم سوري; 1762 – July 6, 1829) was a Fula prince and Amir (commander) from the Fouta Djallon region of Guinea, West Africa, who was captured and sold to slave traders and transported to the United States in 1788 during the Atlantic slave trade. Upon discovering his lineage, his enslaver, Thomas Foster, began referring to him as "Prince", a title used for Abdul until his final days. After spending 40 years in slavery, he was freed in 1828 and returned to Africa the following year but died in Liberia within months of arriving.

== Early life ==
Abdul Rahman Ibrahima was a Torodbe Fulani Muslim prince born in 1762, in Timbuktu, the son of Ibrahima Sori and a Moorish wife. When he was aged five, his father removed the family from Timbuktu to Timbo, now located in Guinea, and there in 1776 Ibrahima consolidated the Islamic confederation of Fouta Djallon, with Timbo as its capital, eventually succeeding as its Almami. Abdul Rahman studied in a madrasa at Djenné and Timbuktu, speaking at least four African languages, Bambara, Fula, Mandinka and Yalunka, in addition to Arabic.

On returning to his homeland in 1781, Abdul became a member of his father's army, being made a regimental commander (Amir), for a campaign that conquered the Bambara. In 1788, he was given command of 2000 cavalry troops for a campaign against the 'Hebohs', who had been harassing European ships that were being supplied with crops and enslaved war-captives by the Fulani to sustain them during the Middle Passage. Though he initially defeated the Hebohs, they later ambushed his cavalry in the mountains, and, refusing to flee, he was shot, captured and enslaved. At the time of his capture, he was married, having had a son who in 1828 was serving as a military commander in Timbo.

== Enslavement ==
Abdul Rahman was captured and taken to the Gambia River and there sold onto the slave ship Africa, reportedly for "two bottles of rum, eight hands of tobacco, two flasks of powder, and a few muskets". Trans-shipped via Dominica to New Orleans, he was then taken upriver to Natchez, Mississippi, where he and another enslaved person were sold to Thomas Foster for about $950.

Initially, Abdul refused to submit to manual labor since, in his Fulani culture, field work was the domain of women and servants. After being subjected to repeated whippings for disobedience, he escaped into the woods and hid for several weeks. During that time, he accepted his fate, and then chose to return to the Foster home. He labored for more than thirty-eight years before gaining his freedom back.

On Christmas Day, 1794, Abdul married Isabella, another woman that Foster enslaved, and eventually fathered a large family of nine children. Isabella would join the Baptist Church by 1797. Though Abdul regularly attended services with his family by 1818, he continued to have objections to those aspects of Christianity that contradicted the Islamic faith of his upbringing, particularly the doctrine of the Trinity, while also criticizing how Christianity was practiced in the context of American plantation slavery.

Being respected by the other enslaved people on the plantation and viewed as loyal and trustworthy, he showed an aptitude for managing cattle and supervising other enslaved people in the growing of cotton, and due to this status, he was allowed to walk to a local market at Washington, Mississippi, to sell vegetables. There in 1807, he was surprised to come across an old acquaintance, Dr. John Coates Cox. In the 1780s, Cox had been serving as a surgeon on an English ship along the West African coast when he became lost and then injured while ashore and was abandoned by his vessel. He was rescued and taken to Timbo as a curiosity. There he healed, residing for six months in the household of Abdul's family, before being escorted back to the coast to find transport home. Decades later, Cox and Abdul met by chance at the Washington market, and the two recognized each other. Cox then offered to buy 'Prince' from Foster for $1000 so the man could return home to Africa, and Cox even recruited the governor of Mississippi to his cause. However, Foster would not sell, viewing Abdul Rahman as indispensable to the plantation, mainly due to his positive influence on the other enslaved people. The doctor continued to seek Abdul's freedom, to no avail, until his death in 1816, and his son William Rousseau Cox again offered to purchase and free Abdul Rahman but was likewise rebuffed.

In 1826, at the encouragement of local newspaperman, Andrew Marschalk, Abdul Rahman wrote a letter in Arabic to his family, and this letter was forwarded via United States Senator Thomas Reed to the U.S. Consulate in Morocco. The consul shared the letter with Sultan Abd' al Rahman II, who asked that U. S. President John Quincy Adams and Secretary of State Henry Clay intervene for the release of Abdul in exchange for the freeing of several Americans illegally held in his country. Following this intervention, in 1828 Thomas Foster agreed to the release of Abdul without payment, transferring the man to Marschalk and his wife, who then manumitted him, with the stipulation that he be sent to Africa by the government. Foster also allowed Marschalk to purchase and free Isabella at a discounted price of $200 raised from the citizens of Natchez. They traveled to Baltimore, where he met Clay. On May 15, he was granted an audience with President Adams, to whom he expressed his desire to see his five sons and eight grandchildren emancipated. He wrote a letter to his children in Mississippi describing the meeting.

== Emigration ==
Before leaving the United States, Abdul Rahman and his wife went on a 10-month tour of various northern cities to solicit donations through the press, personal appearances, the American Colonization Society, and politicians to be used to free his family in Natchez. Abdul often dressed in Moorish garb to give an Oriental impression that would separate himself, as a Moor, from the typical black African slaves, and presented himself in a manner that would appeal to his individual audiences, telling merchants he would establish new trade, promising missionaries that he would evangelize for them, and pledging support for their Liberia colony when speaking to the American Colonization Society. Among his noteworthy champions was the minister and pioneer of education for the deaf, Rev. Thomas Hopkins Gallaudet. This highly publicized collaboration with abolitionists angered Forster and Marschalk, who considered it a breach of the agreement granting his freedom, and Marschalk published articles attacking both Prince Abdul and President Adams during his bid for reelection against Andrew Jackson.

Abdul and Isabella had raised only $4000 of the estimated $10,000 needed to free their children and grandchildren when they departed without their family from Norfolk, Virginia on February 9, 1829, aboard the Harriet. This was an American Colonization Society funded voyage of freemen bound for Liberia. Abdul wrote to America after his arrival, pushing for funding to free his children, reporting his plans to establish trade with his homeland, which he planned to visit, but also stating that he was "unwell, but much better." Though he had garnered support and transportation through the pretense of having fully adopted Christianity, he returned to the full practice of Islam "as soon as he got in sight" of Africa. Abdul, along with 30 other Harriet passengers, died within months of their arrival amidst a yellow fever epidemic decimating the region, on July 6, 1829, aged about 67, never seeing Fouta Djallon or his children again.

== Legacy ==
Abdul and Isabella's funds only bought the freedom of two sons and their families. The eight progeny were reunited with Isabella in Monrovia the year after his death. Thomas Foster died the same year as Abdul. Foster's estate, including those children and grandchildren of Abdul Rahman who remained enslaved, was divided among his heirs.

In 2007, Andrea Kalin directed Prince Among Slaves, a film portraying the life of Abdul Rahman, based on an earlier biography of the same name by Terry Alford, narrated by Mos Def and produced for and aired on PBS.

== See also ==
- Islam in the United States
- List of slaves
- Slavery in the United States
- Trans-Saharan slave trade

== Bibliography ==
- Austin, Allan (1997). African Muslims in Antebellum America (5th ed.). New York, NY: Routledge. ISBN 0-415-91269-5.
- Diouf, Sylviane (1998). Servants of Allah: African Muslims Enslaved in the Americas. New York and London: New York University Press. ISBN 0-8147-1905-8.
- Gallaudet, T. H. (1828). A Statement with Regard to the Moorish Prince, Abduhl Rahhahman. New York: Daniel Fanshaw.
- Turner, Richard Brent (2000). "African Muslim Slaves, the nation of Islam, and the Bible: Identity, Resistance, and Transatlantic Spiritual Struggles". In Wimbush, Vincent L. (ed.). African Americans and the Bible: Sacred Texts and Social Textures. Eugene, Oregon: Wipf and Stock Publishers. pp. 297–318.
