= Fula jihads =

Series of Jihads across West Africa during the 18th and 19th centuries

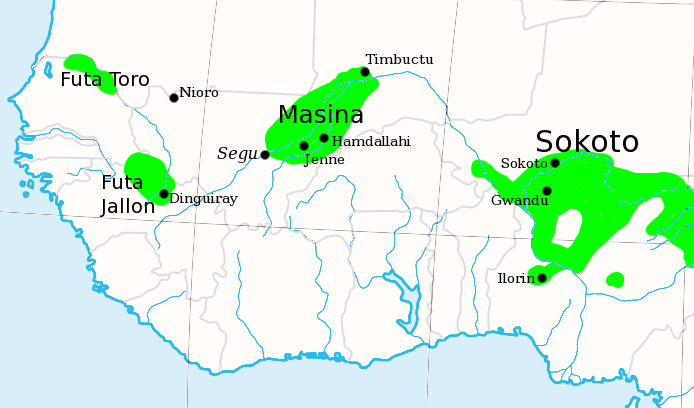
Fula jihad states of West Africa, c. 1830

The Fula (or Fulani) jihads (Arabic: جهاد الفولا), also called the Fulani revolution were a series of jihads that occurred across West Africa during the 18th and 19th centuries, led largely by the Muslim Fula people. The jihads and the jihad states came to an end with European colonization.

The earliest Fulbe polity was established in Bundu in 1690. The first armed uprising took place in Futa Jallon in 1725, when Fula pastoralists, assisted by Muslim traders, rose against the indigenous chiefdoms. By 1750, the Fula had established the Imamate of Futa Jallon and placed the region under sharia law. Their success inspired the Toucouleurs on the banks of the lower Senegal River to establish their own state, the Imamate of Futa Toro, through a series of wars between 1769 and 1776. In the early 19th century, the jihad movement spread eastward to the Hausa states. The revolutionary Usman dan Fodio, through a series of jihads begun in 1804, created the Sokoto Caliphate, the largest state in West Africa at that time. An aggressively expansionist polity, it severely weakened the old Bornu Kingdom.

Foremost among the motivators for the jihads was unity through the spread of religion, and the procurement of slaves by conquering neighbouring peoples.

== Jihad as Islamic reform ==
The reforms aimed to create Islamic states across Western Africa. The reforms also aimed to counter socio-political problems, including under population and shortages of goods such as food and water, which together intensified existing economic problems. Furthermore, they also wanted to stop the European invasion of Africa and the Islamic world, as at this time many European nations were colonizing parts of Africa and Islamic empires such as the Ottomans were weakening. These aims were met with mixed results across the several jihad movements and resulting caliphates that emerged during the 19th century, as some were able to achieve these goals better than others.

=== Reform in practice ===
On developing a stable economy to finance development and bring prosperity to the population, some caliphates were largely successful. The Sokoto Caliphate under the control of Muhammad Bello and Wazir Gidado established a strong economy based on agriculture and artisan goods. This economic growth allowed them to fund political, educational and military development within the Caliphate which lead to it invading and conquering surrounding areas, increasing the number of people under its administration and so achieving the secondary aim of spreading the word of Islam. However, other groups, even within the Sokoto Caliphate, were not able to establish such a stable economy, such as under the Massina jihad of Seku Amadu. During his conflict, he struggled to establish a strong economy due to his lack of resources to safely guard the roaming cattle herds and as such, large parts of the military activity. Hindered by a lack of military and economic resources, due to a more defensive strategy, the Masina jihad was less successful in conquering other areas and spreading its domain of control on the same scale as the Sokoto Caliphate. It can therefore be seen that the development of a stable economy and a strong armed force were largely linked, with different jihad movements having varying strengths in these departments, resulting in different levels of success.

In their defence against European invaders few groups were successful and, instead of defeating the invaders, many Muslim populations had to carry out mass migrations across northern Africa to escape. Those fighting under the jihad of Al-Hajj Umar were forced to flee, as they were unable to push the French forces out of the Senegal River region. This action heavily damaged the legitimacy of this jihad's leadership as it showed the people that their leaders could not protect them effectively. One result of this occurring however, was that it created a greater sense of Muslim identity and caused many Caliphates to increase their interactions with other Caliphates, unifying them against a common enemy and reducing the internal fighting amongst the different groups. So, although many of the Caliphates were unable to achieve their goal of being able to operate an effective military defence against European invaders, they were able to achieve the goal of increasing intra-Muslim relations and cooperation, by doing so increasing the sense of Islamic unity and identity.

When it came to the task of establishing strong and legitimate rule over the Caliphates, the Islamic protagonists were not always successful. In the Hamdullahi Caliphate there was a strong sense of legitimacy under the 30 years rule of Seku Amadu but he failed to name a successor. This led to confusion and ultimately it was decided by council that his son should rule. Unfortunately for his son, this decree did not carry the same sense of legitimacy as if Amadu had himself selected his child. The son's plans actually differed from his father, especially on teaching, and as such he failed to gain the support of the older cohorts of the population.

== Jihad states ==
=== Bundu ===
A small state in present-day Senegal in which Torodbe Malick Sy took power in 1690 in the first successful Fula jihad. It provided a safe haven for other Muslim clerics and a staging ground for future jihads.

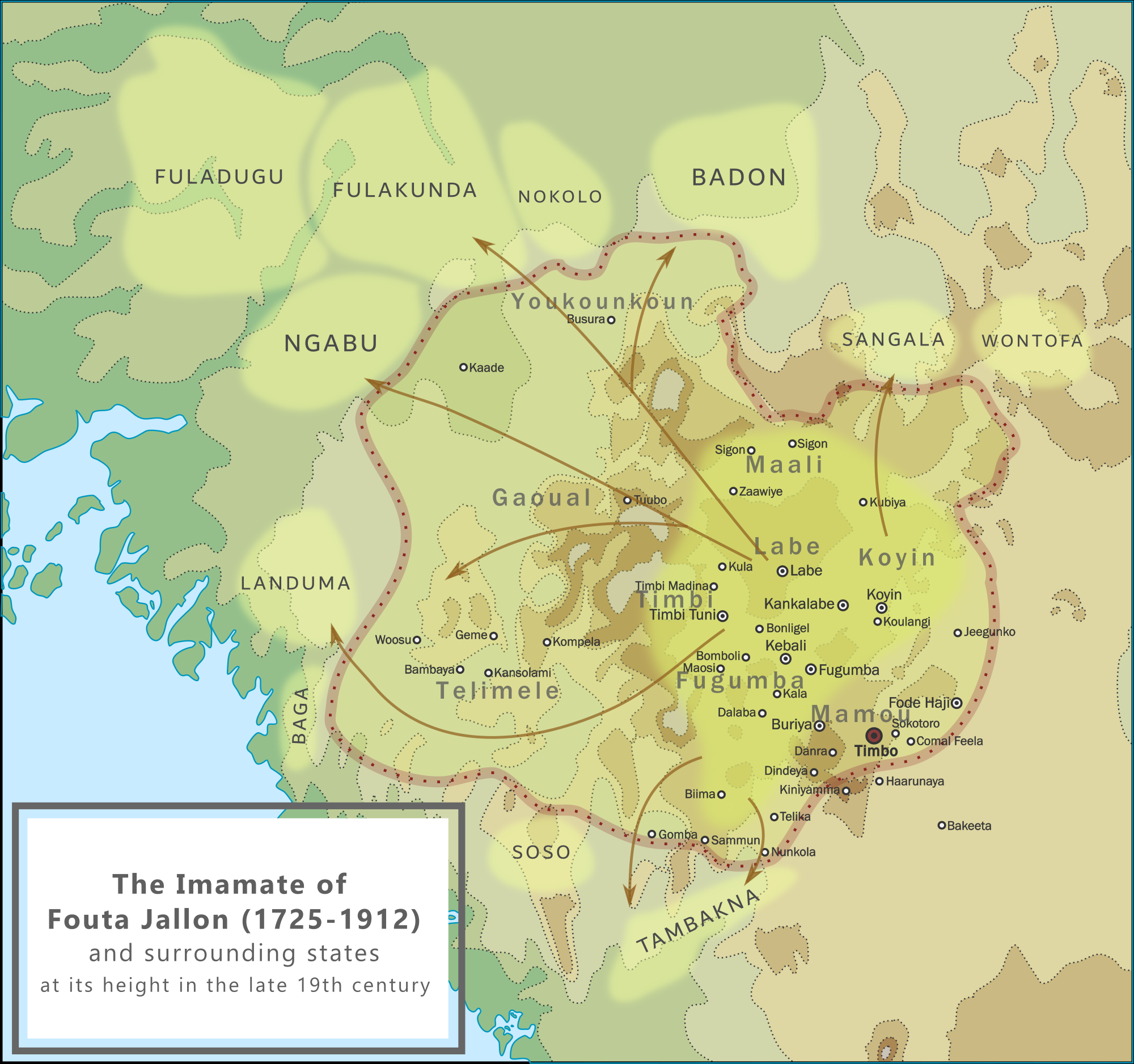
Map of Futa Jallon, late 19th century

=== Futa Jallon ===
The Futa Jallon, located mainly in present-day Guinea, was a major state with a written constitution and ruling alternance between the 2 main parties: the Soriya and the Alphaya. The Futa Jallon state was born in 1735 when Fulani Muslims decided to rise against the non-Muslim indigenous groups and the Muslim Dialonké rulers (who largely renounced Islam in the face of the jihad) to create a confederation of provinces. Alpha Ibrahima Sambegu was elected as the first Almaamy in 1725 at the capital Timbo in present-day Guinea. The Futa Jallon state lasted until 1898 when the French colonial troops defeated the last Almamy (Ruler) Bokar Biro Barry, dismantled the state and integrated it into their new colony of Rivières du Sud, which became Guinea.

=== Futa Toro ===
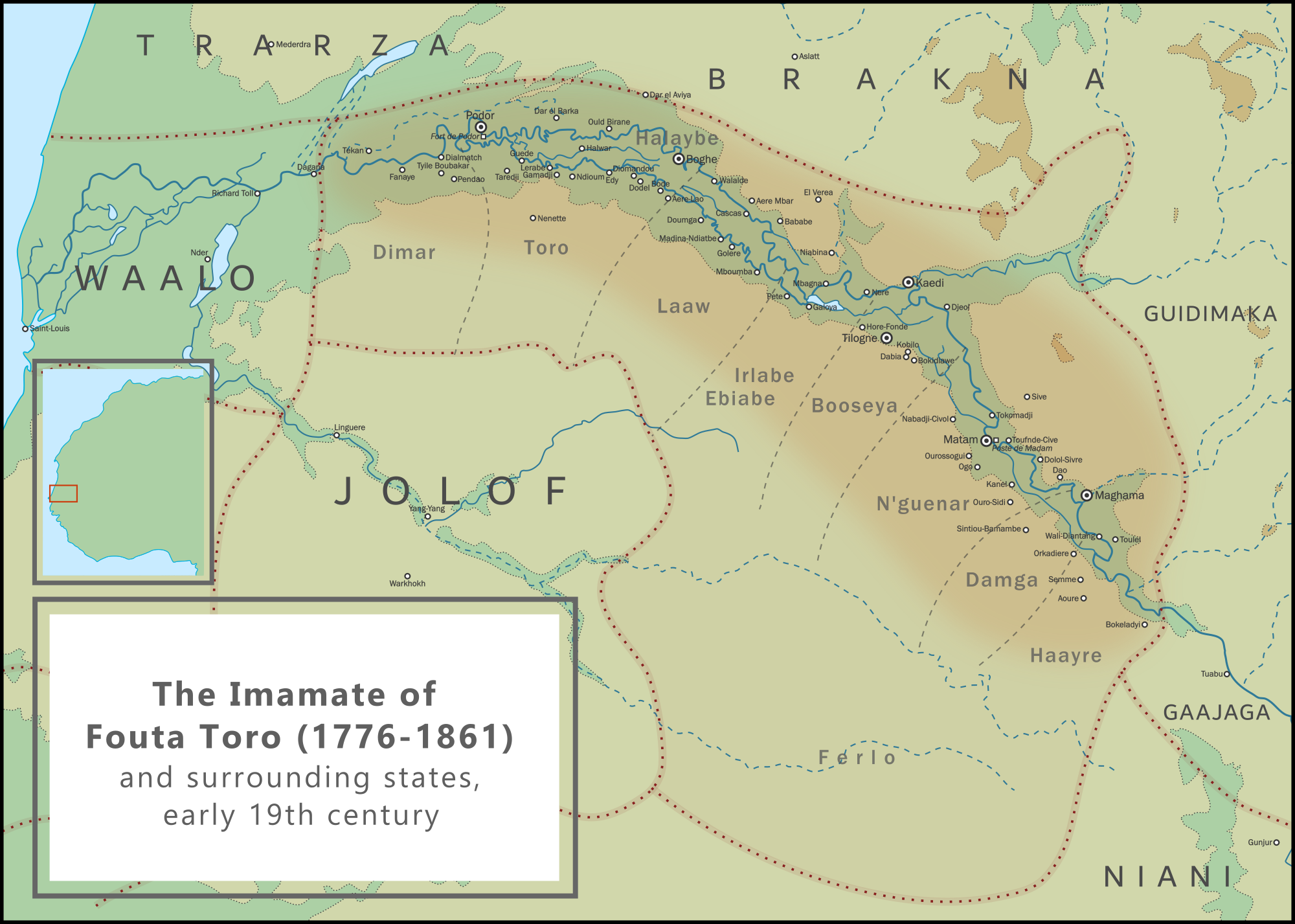
Map of the Imamate of Futa Toro, early 19th century

Under the unifying banner of Islam, the Muslim Fulas revolted against the non-Muslim Fulani of the Denianke Kingdom in 1776 under the leadership of Sileymaani Baal. The following Islamic revolution created the new kingdom of Futa Toro under a government called the Almamate (a term derived from the Pulaar borrowing of the Arabic al-imaam). Before formal colonization this state was weakened by French incursions and the effort by El Hadj Umar Tall to carry his "jihad" eastward (see also Toucouleur Empire, below).

=== Sokoto Caliphate ===
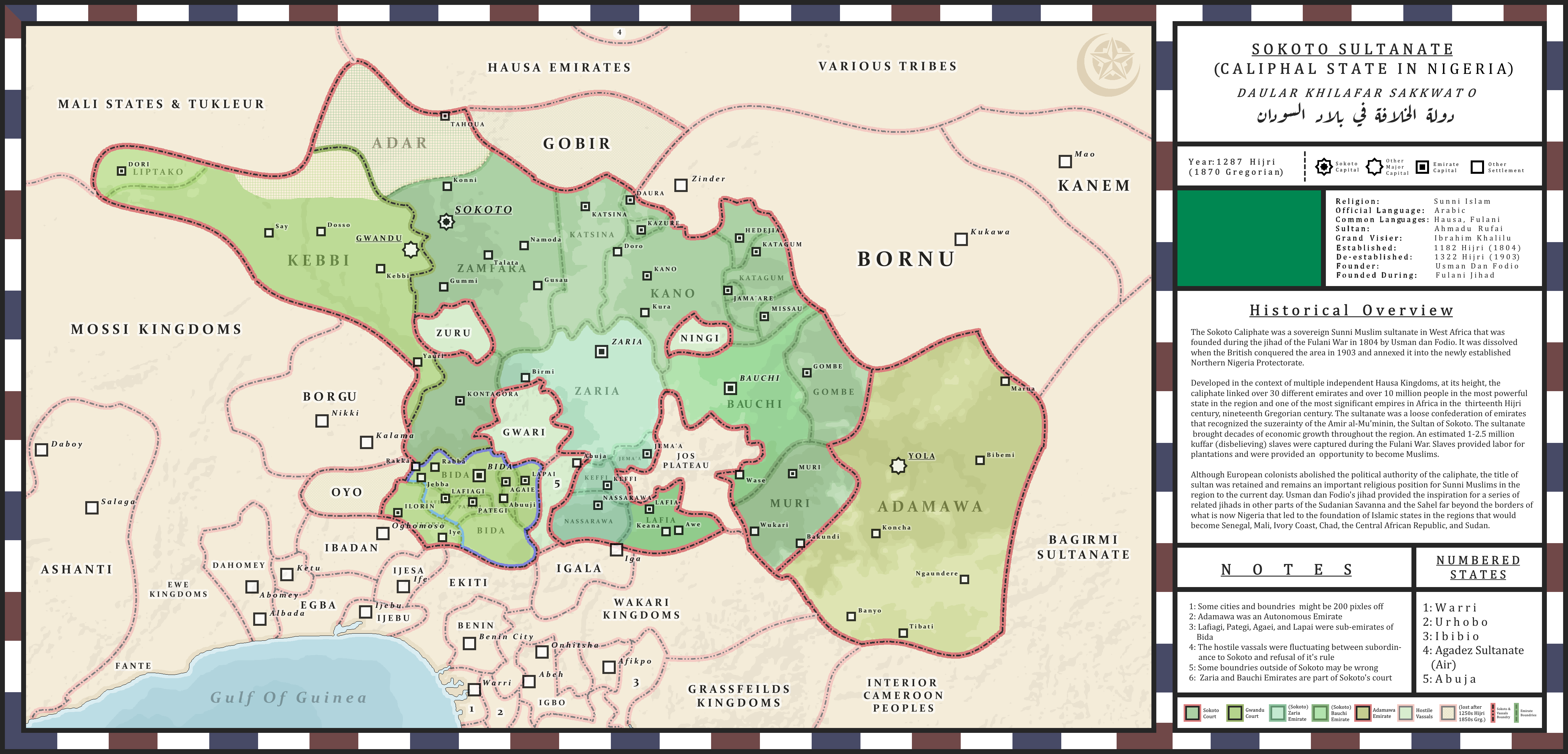
Sokoto Sultanate during the reign of sultan Ahmadu Rufai

At the beginning of the 19th century, Usman dan Fodio overthrew the Hausa kings to create a new Fulani Empire which continued until it was divided up by the European colonizers. Most of these empire's constituent states were brought into the British Northern Nigeria Protectorate around 1901–1903.

The jihad states in the region controlled by the empire included:

- Abuja, replacing the former Zuba; the ruler's title was Sarkin Zazzau, from 1828 also Emir
- Adamawa (now partially in Cameroon), founded in 1809; title Baban-Lamido
- Agaie, founded in 1822; title emir
- Bauchi Emirate, founded in 1805; title Lamido (laamiiɗo in Fula language), meaning "ruler" (similar meaning to Emir )
- Gombe, founded in 1804; title Modibo Gombe.
- Gwandu, a major Fulbe jihad state, founded in 1817; title Emir
- Hadejia, replaced Biram (title Sarkin Biram) in 1805; new title Sarkin Hadejia, from 1808 also styled Emir
- Jama`are, founded in 1811; style Emir.
- Jema`an Darroro, founded in 1810; title Emir
- Kano replaced the old (Hausa) Kano state in March 1807; the old title Sarkin Kano is still used, but now also styled Emir
- Katagum, founded in 1807; title Sarkin Katagum, also styled Emir
- Katsina replaced the old (Hausa) Katsina state in 1805; the old title Sarkin Katsina is still used, but now also styled Emir.
- Kazaure, founded in 1818; title Emir, also styled Sarkin *Arewa (apparently imitating neighbours)
- Keffi, founded in 1802; title Emir
- Lafiagi, founded in 1824; new title Emir
- Lapai, founded in 1825; style Emir
- Massina Empire
- Mubi, founded in 18..; title Emir
- Muri, founded in 1817, style Emir; 1892-1893 de facto French protectorate, 1901 part of Northern Nigerian British protectorate
- Sokoto, the center of the Fulani jihad, established on 21 February 1804 by Usman dan Fodio, title Amir al-Mu´minin, also styled Lamido Julbe; on 20 April 1817 Sokoto was styled sultanate (title sultan, also styled Amir al-Mu´minin and Sarkin Musulmi), the suzerain of all Fulbe jihad states; in 1903 the British occupied the Sokoto Sultanate
- Zaria, superseded the old Zazzau state (title Sarkin Zazzau) on 31 December 1808; new style first Malam, since October/November 1835 Emir, also styled Sarkin Zaria and Sarkin Zazzau

=== Massina Empire ===
Located in what is now central Mali, this state lasted from 1818 until 1862. Inspired by the recent Muslim uprisings of Usman dan Fodio in nearby Hausaland, preacher and social reformer Seku Amadu led a Fula army in jihad against the Bambara Empire. The empire expanded rapidly, taking Djenné and establishing a new capital at Hamdullahi. It was eventually defeated by Umar Tall and incorporated into the Toucouleur Empire.

=== Toucouleur Empire ===
El Hajj Umar Tall led armies east from his base in Futa Tooro and Dinguiraye to conquer Kaarta, the Bambara Empire, and Massina in the early 1860s. The Toucouleur controlled the region until French colonization, at which time the last leader of the state, Ahmadu Tall, fled to Sokoto.
