= Almamy Ahmadou of Timbo =

Almami of Fula

- Citizenship: Guinea
- Occupations: Ruler; Singer

Ahmadou (var. Amadou), was one of the last Almamis (r. 1873–1896) of the Fula Imamate of Futa Jallon, in the Futa Jallon region of today's Guinea.

Ahmadou signed agreements with French representatives Aimé Olivier de Sanderval (10 July 1881, to build a rail line), Beckmann (14 December 1891), and Alby (23 May 1893 to create a protectorate like status). Though resisting explicit protectorate status or the appointment of a permanent French representative in the Fouta Djallon capital of Timbo, these agreements were the first steps to French direct control of the state.

In 1898 French colonial troops defeated the last Almamy Boubacar Biro Barry, dismantled the state and integrated it into their new colony of Rivières du Sud, which became Guinea.

== See also ==
- Imamate of Futa Jallon
- Futa Jallon (region)
