= Bokar Biro =

African ruler

Bokar Biro Barry
- Died: 13 November 1896; Porédaka
- Occupation: Politician
- Known for: Last Almami of the Imamate of Futa Jallon

Bokar Biro Barry (or Boubacar Biro) (died 13 November 1896) was the last independent ruler of the Imamate of Futa Jallon in what is now Guinea. He died in the Battle of Porédaka, when his forces were destroyed by French artillery.

== Background ==
The Imamate of Futa Jallon was one of the last independent states in Guinea, in the highlands It was established as a theocratic state in a jihad launched in 1725 by Karamokho Alfa, and consolidated by his successor Ibrahim Sori. The state was a loose federation of nine provinces, each headed by chief. Two political factions emerged, the Alfaya and Soriya, supporters of the descendants of the first two rulers. A power sharing arrangement evolved under which the position of almami, the head of state, was alternately filled by an Alfaya or Soriya candidate.

By the late nineteenth century the French were the dominant colonial power in the region, and were increasingly impatient with the Futa Jallon's hostility. They were angry with the support Futa Jallon was giving to Samori Ture's Wassoulou Empire, which was also resisting French control. In 1889 the British made a treaty with the French that recognized that Futa Jallon was within the French sphere. However, the British in Freetown, Sierra Leone, continued to give subsidies to Futa Jallon until 1895.

== Almami of Futa Jallon ==
Bokar Biro belonged to the Soriya faction. His base was Timbo, the capital of the Futa Jallon federation. In 1890, the long reign of the Almami Ibrahima Sori Dongolfella ended with his death, triggering a power struggle. The Council of Elders selected Bokar Biro's elder brother as ruler. Bokar Biro took power in a coup after assassinating his brother, and began placing men loyal to him in positions of authority. Bokar Biro had to cope with struggles between the Alfaya and Soriya political factions, and attempts by the rulers of the Labé, Timbi and Fugumba provinces to obtain more autonomy. Also, both slaves and ordinary free people were leaving the country for the less oppressive French-controlled zones.

In July 1892 Bokar Biro was forced to cede power to Amadu of the Alfaya faction. He assumed power once again in June 1894. Some of the chiefs asked for French help to overthrow him. The Alfa Yaya of Labé began maneuvering for full independence of his province. On 13 December 1895 the disgruntled chiefs led by Modi Abdoullaye Dhokhiré attacked and defeated Bokar Biro at Bantignel, and he only narrowly managed to escape. Several weeks later, when most people thought that Bokar Biro was dead, he emerged at Keebu, on the western border of the Timbi province, whose chief gave him assistance in returning to Timbo. He managed to assemble a new army of 1,500 soldiers with which he defeated his enemies on 2 February 1896. The main chiefs went into hiding.

== French intervention ==
At the end of 1894 the French sent Raoul de Beeckman as their representative to meet with Bokar Biro and arrange a treaty. By March 1895 de Beeckman had spent almost three months on the border of Futa Jallon and was giving up hope of arranging a meeting. Without authorization, the French administrator crossed the border and attacked the village of Nanso, near Demukulima, which he accused of having looted a caravan belonging to a French ally. One of the village elders was killed. This incident fueled the hostility of Bokar Biro, who accused the French of a series of hostile actions, including suppression of the trade in slaves with the Sudan, and refusal to return runaway slaves. He was also suspicious of visits to Futa Jallon by French agents on the pretext of trading or making topographical studies, which he thought were in preparation for military intervention.

De Beeckman returned to Futa Jallon the next year. On 18 March 1896 de Beeckman arrived at Timbo, the Futa Jallon capital, with a detachment of troops. The French demanded the right to build roads through Futa Jallon, to instal a representative in Timbo, to vet all appointments of provincial chiefs and a trade monopoly. Bokar Biro resisted, but eventually pretended to sign a treaty in order to get the French out of the way while he dealt with his opponents. When the treaty document was examined in Saint Louis, it turned out that in place of his signature Bokar Biro had written "Bismillah", meaning "in the name of God". Once it was clear that Bokar Biro did not intend to yield to French demands, they decided to resort to armed force if necessary once the rainy season had passed. The French troops temporarily withdrew to Sangoya.

Bokar Biro treated the French withdrawal as a victory. He initiated an aggressively anti-French policy. When his term as Almami came to an end in April 1896 he refused to hand over office. The power struggle escalated, with violent incidents, coming close to outright civil war, with calls for assistance reaching the French in September and October. The French decided the time had come to make their move, breaking up Futa Jallon into smaller client states, with their ally Umar Bademba as Almami of what remained of the Timbo-based state.

== Death ==
Troops were dispatched from Senegal, Guinea and the Sudan, converging on Futa Jallon. A French column captured Timbo on 3 November 1896. Bokar Biro was unable to enlist the support of the chiefs in resisting the French. On 13 November 1896 Bokar Biro fought a pitched battle on the plain of Porédaka. The French artillery destroyed his army. A poet who described the battle said that Bokar Biro kept his word. He did not flee from the French, but was killed by the blast of the cannon. In fact, Bokar Biro managed to escape but was soon captured by some soldiers of his enemy, Sori Illili, and was decapitated. Bokar Biro's son died with him.

With Bokar Biro's death, the French assumed a protectorate. In June 1897 Ernest Noirot, a former set designer for the Folies Bergère, became administrator and started a program to eliminate slavery. In 1904 the French removed the power of the chiefs. In 1905 they arrested Bokar Biro's arch rival Alfa Yaya and sent him into exile. One of his decendents are still alive one is Mohamed Conde from hafia born in January 6 2010.
