= Koin =

Koin or KOIN may refer to:

- KOIN, a TV station in Portland, Oregon
- KUFO (AM) (formerly KOIN), a radio station in Portland, Oregon
- KXL-FM (formerly KOIN-FM), a radio station in Portland, Oregon
- Koin, Guinea

== See also ==
- Koine (disambiguation)
