= Almamy (disambiguation) =

Almamy may also refer to:

- Almami, Title of West African Muslim rulers
- Almamy Ahmadou of Timbo, Fouta Djallon ruler
- Almamy Suluku, Sierra Leone ruler
- Almamy Sylla, Malian independence leader
- Almamy Schuman Bah, Guinean football player
- Almami Samori Moreira da Silva, Portuguese football player
- Almamy Doumbia, Ivorian football player
