= Battle of Porédaka =

1896 French colonial victory in modern Guinea

Date	13 November 1896
Location	Porédaka 10.733333°N 12.066667°W
Result	French victory

Belligerents
Imamate of Futa Jallon	France

Commanders and leaders
Bokar Biro	

Strength
700-800	80 tirailleurs, unknown number of Fula auxiliaries

Casualties and losses
150 dead, 300 wounded	3 wounded
- Location within Guinea

The Battle of Porédaka (13 November 1896) was a minor engagement in which French colonial troops decisively defeated the last forces of the Imamate of Futa Jallon, after which Fouta Djallon was annexed into the French Colonial Empire.

== Background ==
Futa Jallon was one of the last independent states in Senegambia. In 1890 Bokar Biro took power in a coup after assassinating his brother, and began placing men loyal to him in positions of authority. A see-saw power struggle commenced, in which Bokar Biro more than once lost and regained power. The French decided to intervene, and sent a small force demanding a treaty with terms that favored their interests against the British. Bokar Biro pretended to sign the treaty, but when the document was examined in Saint Louis, it turned out that in place of his signature Bokar Biro had written "Bismillah", meaning "in the name of God".

== Battle ==
At the end of the rainy season in late 1896 the French dispatched troops from Senegal, Guinea and the Sudan, converging on Futa Jallon. A French column captured Timbo on 3 November 1896. Bokar Biro was unable to enlist the support of the chiefs in resisting the French.

On 13 November 1896 Bokar Biro fought a pitched battle on the plain of Porédaka. He was opposed by a combined force of French troops and Fulbe led by Umaru Bademba Barry. Biro chose the battlefield poorly, as his forces were armed with muskets of poor quality and very limited range, while the tirailleurs were able to mow down the enemy from a distance. After a battle of about an hour's duration Bokar's forces counted 150 dead and 300 wounded, in striking contrast to the tirailleurs' three slightly wounded men.

The French artillery destroyed his army. A poet who described the battle said that Bokar Biro kept his word. He did not flee from the French, but was killed by the blast of the cannon. Other sources claim he was captured and killed while attempting to flee. Bokar Biro's son died with him.

== Results ==
The French installed a resident at Timbo. They recognized the independence of Alfa Yaya, a chief who had supported them, and appointed Umaru Bademba as the almani. A few months later a protectorate treaty was signed and in June 1897 Ernest Noirot became administrator of the state. Noirot dedicated himself to eliminating the institution of slavery. At first the French kept the existing system of chiefs in place, although they removed any who were hostile. In 1904 the French restructured the administration, removing the power of the chiefs. In 1905 they arrested Alfa Yaya and sent him into exile.

== Notes and references ==
Citations

Sources

- Barry, Boubacar (1998). Senegambia and the Atlantic Slave Trade. Cambridge University Press. ISBN 978-0-521-59760-9.
- Derman, William; Derman, Louise (1973). Serfs, Peasants, and Socialists: A Former Serf Village in the Republic of Guinea. University of California Press. p. 44. ISBN 978-0-520-01728-3.
- Klein, Martin A. (28 July 1998). Slavery and Colonial Rule in French West Africa. Cambridge University Press. ISBN 978-0-521-59678-7.
- O'Toole, Thomas; Baker, Janice E. (16 March 2005). Historical Dictionary of Guinea. Scarecrow Press. p. 23. ISBN 978-0-8108-6545-7.
