= Alfaya =

Alfaya may refer to:

- Alfaya (party), a political group in Guinea
- Asadi al-Faya, a village in Yemen
- Marcelo Alfaya (born 1978), American mixed martial artist
- Javier Alfaya, Spanish journalist and novelist
