= Talansan =

Talansan was the location of a battle in Futa Jallon, in what is now Guinea, in which Muslim forces were victorious. The battle was a key event in the jihad in which the Imamate of Futa Jallon was created.

The marabout party was opposed by the established leaders of the region, who were resisting conversion to Islam. The battle of Talansan was a decisive victory for the marabouts. Talansan was a location to the east of Timbo on the banks of the Bafing River. According to tradition, a force of 99 Muslims defeated an Traditionalist force ten times greater, killing many of their opponents. However, the struggle to convert the population continued to meet resistance, particularly from nomadic Fulbe herders. They rightly feared that the marabouts would use the religion to assert control over their lives.

Most sources date the battle to around 1727 AD (1140 AH), at the start of the jihad. Others say the battle occurred in 1747 or 1748, after many years of fighting for which the records have been lost. A passage of traditional Fula history published by a missionary society in 1876 supports the earlier date, saying the battle occurred at the start of the jihad, and that Alfa of Timbo (Karamokho Alfa) was made king after the victory and ruled for eighteen years.
