= Rivières du Sud =

French colonial division in West Africa

French colonial possessions (in red) at the time of Rivières du Sud administration (circa 1872–1884)

Rivières du Sud (English: Southern Rivers) was a French colonial division in West Africa, roughly corresponding to modern coastal sections of Guinea. While the designation was used from the 18th to 20th century, the administrative division only existed from 1882 to 1891.

== Early usage ==
Since the 18th century, Portuguese, British and French traders had established small stations on the coast which was called Rivières du Sud by the French. The Portuguese had trading stations at Rio Pongo and Rio Nunez, mostly for the purchase of enslaved Africans captured inland and brought to the coast. Subsequently, a number of English and American traders also settled in the region. With the establishment of Sierra Leone by British Abolitionists, this area attracted their attention and that of the Christian Missionary Society, which sought to promote Christianity and trading opportunities By 1820, British suppression of the slave trade and Portuguese imperial decline saw these posts abandoned, with British and French traders moving in. The French admiral Bouët-Willaumez made a number of treaties with coastal communities in the area (usually under the threat of force), and ensured Marseille based trade houses exclusive access to the palm oil trade by the 1840s. Used for making soap, the palm oil trade was with Diola merchants who established markets in the interior, and transported it to the coastal stations.

== Administrative expansion ==
The French colonial governor of Senegal Louis Faidherbe in the 1850s formalised the colonial structure which was christened Rivières du Sud. In 1854 Guinea ports were placed under control of Naval administration and split from new colonial administration in Saint-Louis, Senegal under the name Gorée and Dependencies. Previously, they had fallen under the naval 'supreme commander in Gabon' of the Establissements francais de la Cote de l'Or et du Gabon.

By 1859, Faidherbe's campaigns of conquest on the riverine coast south of Gorée saw the region annexed to the colonial administration, under the arrondissement of Gorée. The Rivières du Sud now referred to the entire region from Sine-Salmon to the border of British Sierra Leone.

In 1865 the fort at Boké was built in the Rio Nunez area, expanding from the main French-controlled town of Conakry. Shortly after this, Bayol was taken as a 'protectorate' as well. The Rio Pongo area, nominally held by Germany, was traded to France for their 'rights' to Porto-Seguro and Petit Popo on the Togolese coast. The British formally recognised French control of the area, and the administrative division collecting these possessions was created under the name Rivières du Sud in 1882.

== Pause ==
The background to these legalistic and administrative manoeuvres was the Berlin Conference of 1884 and the "loaded pause" of French imperial expansion. Domestically, this stemmed from the disastrous French defeat in Tonkin and the collapse of the colonial policy of the Ferry ministry. European horse-trading followed the Berlin conference, in which foreign powers divided the African continent and attempted to consolidate their own possessions. Rivières du Sud was a formal division which, apart from the coast, had little relation to actual governance until the next decade.

== Evolution of French administrative division ==
In 1891, Rivières du Sud was placed under the colonial lieutenant governor at Dakar, who had authority over the French coastal regions east to Porto-Novo (modern Benin).

Governor general Gallieni, having faced fierce resistance to French expansion on the upper Senegal and Niger basin from the Toucouleur Empire, Samori, and then Mahmadu Lamine's forces, turned the colonial gaze to the Rivières du Sud in the late 1880s, marking a new phase in French expansion.

Between 1889 and 1894, Rivières du Sud, Côte d'Ivoire and Dahomey were each successively separated into 'independent' colonies, with Rivières du Sud being renamed the 'Colony of French Guinea'. In 1895 these colonies came under the authority of the governor general of French West Africa, and in 1904, this was formalised into the Afrique Occidentale Française. French Guinea, along with Senegal, Dahomey, Cote-d'Ivoire and Upper Senegal and Niger each were ruled by a lieutenant governor, under the Governor General in Dakar.

== Futa Jallon opposition ==
The Rivières du Sud colony never extended far from the coast, as the French were unable to conquer the people of the Futa Jallon highlands, running from the south of modern Senegal though the interior of modern Guinea.

The Imamate of Futa Jallon was located mainly in present-day Guinea as well as parts of Guinea Bissau, Senegal, and Sierra Leone. A powerful force, it stymied French expansion until 1896 when the French colonial troops defeated the last Almami, Bokar Biro Barry, dismantled the state and integrated it into their colony of French Guinea.

== See also ==
- French West Africa
