= Abdul Kader (almami) =

Eighteen century Islamic scholar

'Abdul Qādir Kan
- Born: 1727–28; Pafa Warneu, Saloum
- Died: 26 April 1806 (aged 78–79) Gouriki

Abdul Kader Kan (Arabic: عبد القادر; c. 1726 – 26 April 1806) was an 18th-century Islamic scholar and military leader, and the first Almaami of the Imamate of Futa Toro, hailing from what is now Senegal.

== Background ==
Abdul Kader Kan was born in Pafa Warneu in the Saloum, where his father was teaching. He came from a line of Islamic scholars; his grandfather Lamin had performed the pilgrimage to Mecca, and his father Hamady studied the Qur'an in Futa Jallon. He studied in Cayor and Mauritania under Moktar Ndumbe Diop, who founded a school at Coki.

Before ascending to political power, Kan was an independent qadi in Appe, near Bundu. He initially did not participate in the revolt against the Deeñanke.

== Election ==
Abdul Kader Kan was one of the candidates to succeed Sulayman Bal, who had led the revolt that overthrew the Deeñanke ruling class. According to historian Rudolph T. Ware III, his nomination came after another cleric refused the post, and Kan was hesitant until Sulayman was killed in battle in 1776. Ware attributes this hesitation to the “pious distance” from political power traditionally kept by Senegambian clerics. Robinson cites what he describes as a more obscure tradition, in which Abdul Kader Kan was elected after a longer period of political confusion, and that the torodbe leadership was unsure if they wanted to elect a leader as an Almaami, which would have acted as an explicit declaration for a desire to establish a separate Islamic state.

Abdul Kader Kan was inaugurated as the Almaami in 1776, at approximately fifty years of age. Robinson describes a “remarkable continuity with Denyanke installations and similarities with procedures adopted in the Muslim state of Futa Jallon”: Kan was kept in seclusion for a week as sacrifices of livestock were made on his behalf. He was then given a turban signifying his office by a cleric who had served as an advisor to the previous regime. At least fifty chiefs swore an oath of loyalty to him at this ceremony. One source states that ceremony involved the full recitation of the Qur’an, the ‘Ishriniyyat, and the Dala'il al-Khayrat, with Kan making the clerics who recited them promise to correct him if they saw him failing to live up to the standards set by each work. This information comes from an account citing an earlier record that is no longer extant.

== Rule and Death ==
After his elevation, Kan established his capital at Thilogne. His first act was to defeat the Brakna Moors. The last Denianke Saltigi, Sule Bubu Gayssiri, was still holding out in western Futa Toro. Kan and the reformist forces suffered several defeats trying to subdue him, but after his accidental death agreed to allow the Denianke to retain some autonomy in the area. In 1785 he turned towards the Kingdom of Jolof, defeating the Burba Mbaba Kumpa Kumbas.

In 1786, now allied with the Emirate of Brakna, Kan defeated the Trarza Moors near Dagana, killing their emir Ali Kouri and freeing the population from their raids and extortion. Kan also consolidated clerical rule, filling the territorial administration with loyal supporters, who gradually established hereditary positions as electors.

The rulers of neighboring Waalo and Cayor had initially agreed to follow Kan's interpretation of Islam. In 1790 a new damel, Amari Ngone Ndela, took the throne of Cayor and backtracked. An uprising of the local marabout class was crushed, with many rebels sold into slavery. In 1796 Abdul Kader, allied with the Kingdom of Jolof, marched at the head of the largest army ever seen in Senegambia to avenge the defeat and re-assert his influence in Cayor. In response, the Damel poisoned the wells of his eastern provinces, so that when the Torodbe army emerged from the Ferlo Desert they found neither food nor water. The Almamy's army was routed at the ensuing battle of Bunxoy, and Abdul Kader himself was captured. Ndela treated him with honor and respect, holding him in Cayor until a new Almamy had been elected, then sent him back to Futa Toro.

The Almaami frequently clashed with the French in Saint-Louis over trade and customs payments, with the latter raiding Futa Toro repeatedly between 1804 and 1806. That year, Bundu and Kaarta, alarmed by Kan's incessant intervention in their affairs, allied with dissidents to invade Futa Toro. Abdul Kader Kan was reportedly shot by the Almaami of Bundu on his prayer mat in the midst of the losing battle of Gouriki.

== Hostility to the Slave Trade ==
Based on the letters written by Thomas Clarkson, at least one scholar has made the argument that the reverend believed that Abdul Kader Kan had completely abolished the slave trade in Futa Toro. One such letter describes Kan as "the wise and virtuous Almaamy" who provides an "illustrious example in extirpating the commerce in the human race." A treaty had been signed which was meant to prevent the French from selling the people of Futa Toro into slavery, and the Almaami's success against the Emirate of Trarza may have been due to his willingness to release their slaves upon defeat. While there is no definitive proof that this lay behind the campaign's success, the promise of releasing slaves who fought against their masters was a common war strategy at this time.

The characterization of the Almaami as an abolitionist is not uncontested. Others characterize his policy of slavery as simply more in accord with traditional Islamic slavery; that is to say that while Muslims could not be legally enslaved, nonbelievers were still licit for enslavement. Though French slave traders were not allowed to either enslave the inhabitants of the Futa Toro nor transport slaves through the territory of the Imamate, the inhabitants themselves still owned slaves. According to this understanding, the inhabitants of Futa Toro were not protected because of a general hostility to slavery, but rather because the Almaami's subjects were by definition Muslim.
