= Imamate of Futa Jallon =

1725–1912 state in West Africa, in modern Guinea

Imamate of Futa Djallon
- 1725–1912
- Flag used after the establishment of the French Protectorate

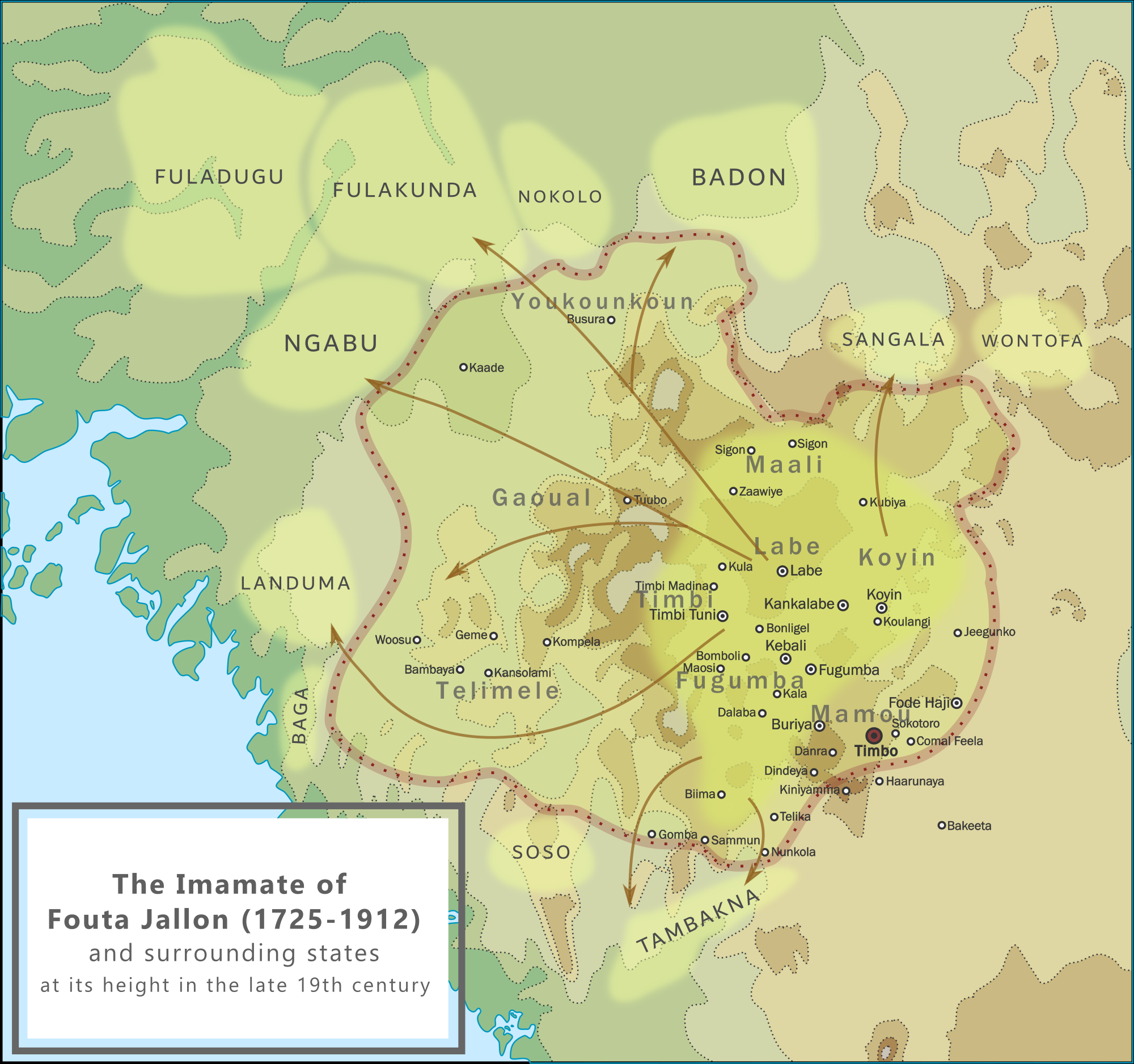
- Map of the Imamate of Futa Jallon and its tributaries at its height
- Capital: Timbo
- Common languages: Arabic (official); Pular language
- Religion: Sunni Islam
- Government: Imamate
- Almamy
  - 1725–1777: Alfa Ibrahim
  - 1890-1896: Bokar Biro (last sovereign)
  - 1906–1912: Boubacar IV (last)
- History
  - Established: 1725
  - French protectorate: November 18th 1896
  - Disestablished: 1912
Preceded by	Succeeded by
Kaabu	French West Africa; Portuguese Guinea
- Today part of: Guinea; Senegal

The Imamate of Futa Jallon or Jalon (Arabic: إمامة فوتة جالون; Pular: Fuuta Jaloo or Fuuta Jalon فُوتَ جَلࣾو, 𞤊𞤵𞥅𞤼𞤢 𞤔𞤢𞤤𞤮𞥅), sometimes referred to as the Emirate of Timbo, was a West African Islamic state based in the Fouta Djallon highlands of modern Guinea. The state was founded in 1725 by a Fulani jihad and became part of French West Africa in 1896.

Over the course of the Imamate's existence, the region underwent a transformation from patriarchal, egalitarian animist societies to a hierarchal, segregationist, and aristocratic one, where Muslims (the rimbhè) received full rights and non-Muslims (the jiyabhe) constituted the slave class. The 19th century saw the golden age of Islam in Fouta Djallon, as the Imamate became a leading religious centre in West Africa.

== History ==
=== Origins ===
Semi-nomadic Fulɓe first came to the Fouta Djallon over successive generations between the 15th and 16th centuries. Initially, they followed a traditional African religion and coexisted peacefully with the native Yalunka people. In the 18th century the region saw an influx of Muslim Fulɓe either from the Sultanate of Massina in the Inner Niger Delta or from the namesake Massina in the Aoukar region of modern-day Mauritania. By 1700, wealthy Muslim Fulanis resented the high taxes and demanded the right to build mosques and Islamic madrasas.

In the 1720's a revolt of Muslim Fula and Malinke broke out under the leadership of the Torodbe cleric Alfa Ba, who declared himself amir al-muminim, or “commander of the faithful” and launched a jihad against the region's non-Muslims, namely the Susu and Yalunka. The Yalunka had initially accepted Islam, however later renounced the religion. Alfa Ba was killed in 1725, however his son Ibrahim Sambegu took over and defeated the animists at the decisive battle of Talansan in 1727. The Yalunka were driven out of Fouta Djallon, and many Susu migrated south and west, coming to dominate the groups there. Subsequently Ibrahim, taking the name Karamokh Alfa, was named the first almamy.

=== Regional power ===
Karamokho Alfa died in 1751 and was succeeded by Emir Ibrahim Sori, who consolidated the power of the Islamic state. Beginning in the 1770s, the revolution in Futa Jallon inspired a similar movement in Futa Toro, where the Torodbe cleric Sulayman Bal overthrew the Denianke dynasty in 1776. Sori's death in 1791 led to a series of succession disputes between the leading Soriya and Alfaya families. Things improved after 1845, when they agreed to alternate the imamate between them every two years.

West Africa circa 1875

At its height, the Imamate of Futa Jallon was one of the most powerful states in West Africa, backed by powerful free and slave armies. They were able to exercise significant control over the weaker coastal states along the Atlantic, allowing them to take advantage of the thriving Atlantic slave trade with the European trading factories on the coast, particularly the French and Portuguese. The Fula also supplied grain, cattle and other goods to their European neighbors. The first attempts at economically penetrating the interior were made by the British from Sierra Leone in 1794 in an effort to secure trading privileges.

Throughout the 19th century, the ruling class lived increasingly lavish lifestyles, with the population bearing a heavy tax burden. A resistance movement known as Hubbu, meaning 'those who refuse', broke out, led by a pious Fulbe named Alfa Mamadu Dyuhe. His army, consisting of the oppressed herder class and runaway slaves, waged decades of war against the state, at one point even capturing Timbo before forces from the other provinces united to defeat them.

In 1865, at the climax of a long period of on-and-off conflict, Futa Jallon invaded the Mandinka kingdom of Kaabu in support of a revolution led by Alpha Molo. At the decisive Battle of Kansala in 1867 Kaabu's capital was destroyed and the Imamate extended its control into Fuladu in the Casamance basin. In 1879, the Almamy Ibrahima Sory Dara secured an alliance with Samori Ture, whose Wassoulou Empire was rising to the east and needed secure access to European arms traders on the coast. For the Fulas, this alliance served a double purpose, enlisting the Malinke ruler to put down the remnants of the Hubbu, who raided trade caravans, and act as a counterweight to growing French power in the region.

=== Bokar Biro and the French ===
Since the mid-1800s the French, and particularly governor Louis Faidherbe, had envisioned Futa Jallon as an integral part of France's imperial project in West Africa. In 1881, spurred by tentative British moves, the French negotiated a treaty with the Futa Jallon leadership that they believed established a French protectorate. The Arabic version, however, contained no such clauses. Nevertheless by 1889 other international powers had accepted Futa Jallon as falling within the French sphere of influence, even after another treaty in 1893 validated the Fulani interpretation.

In 1890 Bokar Biro murdered his older brother as part of a successful bid for control of the Soriya political faction. Although the French were determined to avoid a bloody war of conquest, they were putting increasing pressure on the Imamate. This left Biro in a difficult diplomatic situation. The Fula leadership held out the spectre of closer relations with the British in Sierra Leone as a threat against the French, having established a trading relationship before 1881. The British, however, had no intention of intervening after recognizing French claims in 1889, and terminated the trade relationship entirely in 1895. The Almanis also played the separate French colonial administrations against each other, until the 1895 creation of a coordinated French West African colonial authority. Finally they leveraged the complicated structure of the Imamate's government, with the alternating control of the central government and provinces between the two factions, as a pretext to delay concessions with further consultation.

Bokar Biro moved to strengthen central control, and provincial leaders resisted led by Alfa Yaya of Labé. On 13 December 1895 they defeated Biro at Bantignel, but he escaped and returned to power with French help in early 1896. The French conditioned their support on a new treaty, but found upon translation that Biro, rather than signing, had written bismillah.

At the same time that the French definitively lost faith in Bokar Biro, the internal stability of the state was fracturing. The provincial heads whose rebellion had been defeated looked to the French for support. Dissenting factions within the Soriya, who had not forgiven the murder of Biro's brother, did the same. Endemic raiding and oppressive taxation seemingly had the people ready to support a change as well. To make matters even more critical, the Alfaya almamy Hamadu, died, and the leading candidate to replace him, and thus to alternate rule with Biro, was the pro-French Omaru Bademba. Biro tried to assassinate him, and when that failed he propped up two Alfaya rivals. Bademba crushed them, then attacked Bokar Biro himself, but was defeated and fled to the French.

In November 1896, citing Bokar Biro's violation of his constitutional term as a pretext, the French intervened to depose him. They marched into Timbo without resistance on the 3rd. On the 14th a small detachment of better-armed French soldiers routed Biro's army at the Battle of Porédaka, where he was killed. The French installed Bokar's cousin, Sori El Eli, and Bademba as Soriya and Alfaya Almamis, now serving as French clients rather than as independent rulers.

=== Protectorate ===
In 1897, the French granted independence to Alfa Yaya. By 1904, however, jurisdictional and land disputes led to a planned revolt. The French preempted this by exiling Yaya to Dahomey.

== Government ==
The Imamate of Futa Jallon was governed under a strict interpretation of Sharia with a central ruler in the city of Timbo, near present-day Mamou. The Imamate was a federation of nine provinces called diwe, which all enjoyed a certain amount of autonomy. These diwe were: Timbo, Timbi, Labè, Koîn, Kolladhè, Fugumba, Kébaly, Fodé Hadji and Bhouria. The council of elders also had considerable power to advise or remove the Almamy.

The Muslims of Futa Jallon became divided into factions. The clerical faction took the name of the Alfaya out of respect to the legacy of Karamokho Alfa, while the secular faction called themselves the Soriya after his successor Ibrahima Sori. The rulers of the two cities of Timbo and Fugumba were descended from the same original family, and later all competition for the position of almamy was between these two cities. In 1845 the two factions came to an agreement that power should alternate between leaders of the two factions, with each faction's chosen almamy serving in alternating two-year terms. This was well-respected up until the Bokar Biro's attempt to hold onto power in 1896, which precipitated the fall of the Imamate.

== Economy and culture ==
The Imamate was a major center of Islamic education and art. Fulfulde was in Futa Djallon a vernacular language written using Arabic script. Fula poets composed epic poetry in Fulfulde in the 19th century about faith, law, and morality, and many women could read the Quran. Islamic disciplines such as translation, the hadiths, law, apologetics, mysticism, and the ancillary sciences such as grammar, rhetoric, literature, and astronomy were taught, and Europeans were reportedly impressed at the degree of scholarship.

The Imamate enslaved non-Muslim people both inside and outside its border, selling the slaves to European trading houses on the coast, or settling the slaves (hubbu) in agricultural colonies called runde. In 1785 a major slave revolt broke out but was suppressed, although many survivors fled. By the mid-19th century, slaves did most if not all of the agricultural work.

== See also ==
- History of Guinea
- Fula people
- Kaabu Empire
- Battle of Kansala
