= West African jihads =

West African jihads may refer to:

- Fula jihads, the 18th- and 19th-century Islamic movements that led the founding of various Fula states
- Insurgency in the Maghreb (2002–present), the ongoing jihadist conflict in the Sahel
- Boko Haram insurgency, the ongoing insurgency in Nigeria
