= Modibo =

Modibo, Modibbo or Moodibbo is a name in some Fulɓe or Fulani regions. In some regions it's used as a form of respect, which means 'a learned scholar'. Others are named Moodibbo after one's parents or grand parents. Notable people with the name include:

== Modibo ==
- Modibo Adama (1786 – 1847), Fulani scholar and Lamido Fombina
- Modibo Diakité (born 1987), French footballer
- Modibo Keïta (1915–1977), Malian politician
- Modibo Keita (born 1942), Malian politician
- Modibo Maïga (born 1987), Malian footballer
- Modibo Niakaté (born 1981), French basketball player
- Modibo Sagnan (born 1999), French footballer
- Modibo Sidibé (born 1952), Malian politician
- Modibo Tounty Guindo, Malian judge magistrate

== Modibbo ==
- Aliyu Modibbo Umar
- Sa'adatu Modibbo Kawu
- Modibbo Raji
- Mahmud Modibbo Tukur
- Salihu Modibbo Alfa Belgore
- Alkali Mahmud Modibbo

== Other uses ==
- Modibbo Adama Federal University of Technology, Yola
