= Porédaka =

- Sub-prefecture and town
- Location in Guinea
- Coordinates: 10°44′N 12°04′W
- Country: Guinea
- Region: Mamou Region
- Prefecture: Mamou Prefecture
- Time zone: UTC+0 (GMT)

Porédaka is a town and sub-prefecture in the Mamou Prefecture in the Mamou Region of Guinea. It is located roughly 55 kilometres (34 mi) northeast of Mamou. The Battle of Porédaka took place here on 13 November 1896, during which French colonial troops decisively defeated the last forces of the Imamate of Futa Jallon, after which Futa Jallon was annexed into Senegambia.

== Notable people ==
- Dr. Boubacar Diallo Telli (1925 – February 1977) – Diplomat and Politician. First Secretary-General of the Organization of African Unity (OAU), UN Representative, Ambassador to USA, Minister of Justice
- Dr. Tierno Monénembo (real name Thierno Saidou Diallo) – Doctorate in biochemistry. Professor and novelist, winner of the Prix Renaudot award in 2008 for his novel The King of Kahel, winner of Grand Prix de la Francophonie 2017.
- Mohamed Béavogui (Toma/Fulani)- Prime Minister of Guinea
