= Sylviane Diouf =

Historian and curator of the African diaspora

Sylviane Anna Diouf is a historian and curator of the African diaspora. She is a visiting scholar at the Center for the Study of Slavery and Justice at Brown University and a member of the Scientific Committee of the International Coalition of Sites of Conscience. In an interview she said her contributions as a social historian "may be the uncovering of essential stories and topics that were overlooked or negated, but which actually offer new insights into the experience of the African Diaspora. A scholar said my work re-shapes and re-directs our understanding of this history; it shifts our attention, corrects the historical record, and reveals hidden and forgotten voices."

== Early life and education ==
Diouf was born in France to a Senegalese physicist and a French school principal. She is a descendant of Khaly Amar Fall (1555–1638), the founder (in 1603) of Pir, the Senegalese institute of higher Islamic studies. Historical figures such as Sulayman Bal and Abdel Kader Kane who blocked the slave trade on the Senegal River in the 18th century studied at Pir. Many Islamic reformists and later opponents of colonization were also students there and in 1870 the French burned down the school. But it was rebuilt and still exists. Diouf studied at Université Denis Diderot in Paris and has lived and traveled extensively in Europe, Africa, the Americas and Asia. She lives in New York.

== Academic work ==
In addition to publishing scholarly works on African Diasporan themes, Diouf has written black history children's books, curated gallery and online exhibitions, lectured widely on the global black experience, and appeared as an expert commentator in documentary films."

Her book, Dreams of Africa in Alabama: The Slave Ship Clotilda and the Story of the Last Africans Brought to America (Oxford University Press, 2007), is the first to give a detailed account of the 110 young Africans from Benin and Nigeria, who were brought in July 1860 to Alabama on the last recorded slave ship to the United States. The book received the Wesley Logan Prize of the American Historical Association and the James Sulzby Award of the Alabama Historical Association. It was a finalist for the Hurston/Wright Legacy Award. The discovery in 2019 of the wreck of the Clotilda off the coast of Mobile brought international attention to this story.

Diouf is the author of Slavery's Exiles: The Story of the American Maroons (New York University Press, 2014). It is the first book to detail the experience of the men, women, and children who fled U.S. slavery and found refuge in the woods and swamps. Pulitzer Prize-winning historian Eric Foner noted that Slavery's Exiles is "an important addition to our understanding of slave society and black resistance."

Servants of Allah: African Muslims Enslaved in the Americas (New York University Press, 1998), the first book on the topic, has been praised for its detailed, well-written, and well-researched study of West African Muslims in 20 colonies/countries of the Americas from the 16th to the 19th centuries. Through an abundance of primary sources, Diouf explores the lives of individuals and communities focusing on expressions of faith, continued adherence to Islam, material culture, literacy, resistance, revolts, influence on non-Muslim communities and the Muslims' legacy. A 15th-anniversary, expanded, illustrated and updated edition was published in 2013.

Diouf gave the keynote address to the United Nations General Assembly on March 25, 2015, during the commemoration of the International Day of Remembrance of the Victims of Slavery and the Transatlantic Slave Trade. She edited the essay collection, Fighting the Slave Trade: West African Strategies (Ohio University Press, 2003), the first book to study African resistance to the slave trade. She co-edited In Motion: The African-American Migration Experience (National Geographic, 2005), and Black Power 50 (The New Press, 2016).

She has written several books on African history and on slavery for younger readers. She received the 2001 Africana Book Award for Older Readers from the African Studies Association for Kings and Queens of West Africa, part of a four-book series (Scholastic, 2000). She authored a book on the lives of children enslaved in the U.S., Growing Up in Slavery (Lerner Publishing Group, 2001); and her fiction book Bintou’s Braids (Chronicle Books, 2001) has been published in the U.S., France, and Brazil.

Diouf appeared on PBS in the documentaries This Far by Faith: African-American Spiritual Journeys, Prince Among Slaves, Cimarronaje en Panama, The Neo African Americans and History Detectives. She has lectured internationally and was the inaugural Director of the Lapidus Center for the Historical Analysis of Transatlantic Slavery at the Schomburg Center for Research in Black Culture of The New York Public Library.

== Books ==
- Black Power 50, 2016, The New Press
- Slavery's Exiles: The Story of the American Maroons, 2014, New York University Press
- Servants of Allah: African Muslims Enslaved in the Americas, 15th anniversary edition, 2013, New York University Press
- Dreams of Africa in Alabama: The Slave Ship Clotilda and the Story of the Last Africans Brought to America, 2007, Oxford University Press
- In Motion: The African-American Migration Experience, 2005, National Geographic Society
- Fighting the Slave Trade: West African Strategies, 2003, Ohio University Press
- Servants of Allah: African Muslims Enslaved in the Americas, 1998, New York University Press
- Bintou's Braids, 2001, Chronicle Books. French and Brazilian editions.
- Growing Up in Slavery, 2001, Lerner Publishing Group
- Kings and Queens of Africa, 2000, Scholastic

== Articles and chapters in edited books ==
- From the Holds of the Clotilda to African Town, The Unesco Courier, Fall 2019
- What Islam Gave the Blues, Renovatio, Spring 2019
- Borderland Maroons in Fugitive Slaves and Places of Freedom in North America, D. A. Pargas, ed. University Press of Florida Press, 2018.
- '‘God Does Not Allow Kings to Enslave Their People’ ”: Islamic Reformists and the Transatlantic Slave Trade”', in A Muslim American Slave: The Life of Omar ibn Said, Ala Alryyes, ed. Madison: The University of Wisconsin Press, 2011
- African Resistance to the Transatlantic Slave Trade, in 200 Years Later… Commemorating the 200 year anniversary of the abolition of the Transatlantic Slave Trade Berlin: Werstatt Der Kulturen, 2008
- Muslims and the Transatlantic Slave Trade, Seasons, Spring–Summer 2005
- The West African Paradox, in Muslims' Place in the American Public Square: Hopes, Fears, and Aspirations, Zahid Bukhari, ed. Altamira Press, 2004
- African Muslims in Bondage: Realities, Memories, and Legacies, in Monuments of the Black Atlantic: History, Memory and Politics, Maria Diedrich, Joanne M. Braxton, eds. Hamburg: Lit Verlag, 2004
- Manding in the Americas, in Trans-Atlantic Dimensions of Ethnicity in the African Diaspora, Paul E. Lovejoy and David Trotman, eds. London: Continuum, 2003
- Invisible Muslims: The Sahelians in France, in Muslim Minorities in the West: Visible and Invisible, Yvonne Haddad and Jane Smith, eds. Altamira Press, 2002
- American Slaves Who Were Readers and Writers, The Journal of Blacks in Higher Education, Summer 1999
- Sadaqah Among African Muslims Enslaved in the Americas, The Journal of Islamic Studies, Oxford University Press, 1999
- Senegalese in New York: A Model Minority? Black Renaissance, no. 2, Summer–Fall 1997

== Exhibitions ==
- Black New Yorkers 1613–2010
- Black Power!
- Power In Print
- Ready For the Revolution: Education, Arts, and Aesthetics of the Black Power Movement
- The Black Power Movement: The Legacy
- Revisiting Nat Turner
- Africans in India: From Slaves to Generals and Rulers (traveled to 20 countries)
- The African Diaspora in the Indian Ocean World
- Africana Age: African and African Diasporan Transformations in the 20th Century
- African Americans and American Politics
- The Abolition of the Transatlantic Slave Trade: The Forgotten Story
- In Motion: The African American Migration Experience

== Awards ==
- 2009 George Sulzby Award of the Alabama Historical Association for Dreams of Africa in Alabama: The Slave Ship Clotilda and the Story of the Last Africans Brought to America (Oxford University Press).
- 2009 Rosa Parks Award for Social Justice
- 2008 Wesley-Logan Prize of the American Historical Association for Dreams of Africa in Alabama: The Slave Ship Clotilda and the Story of the Last Africans Brought to America
- 2008 Hurston/Wright Legacy Award, finalist, Dreams of Africa in Alabama: The Slave Ship Clotilda and the Story of the Last Africans Brought to America
- 2008 Pen and Brush Lifetime Achievement Award
- 2006 Dr. Betty Shabbazz Lifetime Achievement Award
- 2003 Comité des Mamans (France) Winner, Bintou Quatre Choux
- 2001 African Studies Association, Children Africana Book Award for Older Readers: Kings and Queens of West Africa
- 1999 Choice, Outstanding Academic Book for Servants of Allah: African Muslims Enslaved in the Americas
- 1999 Gustavus Meyers Center for the Study of Human Rights in North America, Outstanding Books Award for Servants of Allah: African Muslims Enslaved in the Americas.
