= Guindo =

Guindo is a surname. Notable people with the surname include:

- Aboubacar Guindo (born 1981), Malian football player
- Brahima Guindo (born 1977), Malian judoka
- Daouda Guindo (born 2002), Malian footballer
- Housseini Amion Guindo (born 1970), Malian politician
- Modibo Tounty Guindo, Malian judge
- Moussa Guindo (born 1991), Ivorian-Malian football player
