= Torodbe =

Muslim clerics of Sudan

Torodbe; تورودبي
Regions with significant populations
- Senegambia

Religions
- Islam

Scriptures
- Quran

Languages
- Fula language, Arabic

The Torodbe; singular Torodo (Note: From the Fula (Pulaar): toorodɓe or tooroɓɓe, singular toorooɗo) (also called Turudiyya, Banu Toro, Takrur, Toronkawa) were Muslim Toucouleur clerics and theocratic monarchs who preached and reigned in Futa Toro, a region located in the north of present-day Senegal, and other Fula communities in West Africa from at least the seventeenth to the early twentieth century. Drawn from all ethnicites and levels of society, the Torodbe aimed to 'purify' the Islam practiced in West Africa and establish Islamic states run with Islamic law.

== Origins ==
The Torodbe originated in Futa Toro, a strip of agricultural land along the Senegal River and at the time the state of Takrur, from as early as the 9th to as late as 13th century, later spreading throughout the Fulbe territories.

They may well have been a distinct group by the fifteenth century, when the Denianke conquered Takrur, creating the Empire of Great Fulo. In 1644 the Zawaya Berber reformer Nasr ad-Din launched a jihad to restore purity of religious observance in the Senegal river valley. He gained support from the Torodbe clerical clan against the traditional leaders of the region and initially saw great success, but Nasr ad-Din was killed in 1674 and by 1677 the movement had been defeated. After this defeat, some of the Torodbe migrated south to Bundu and some continued on to the Fouta Djallon.

== Organization ==
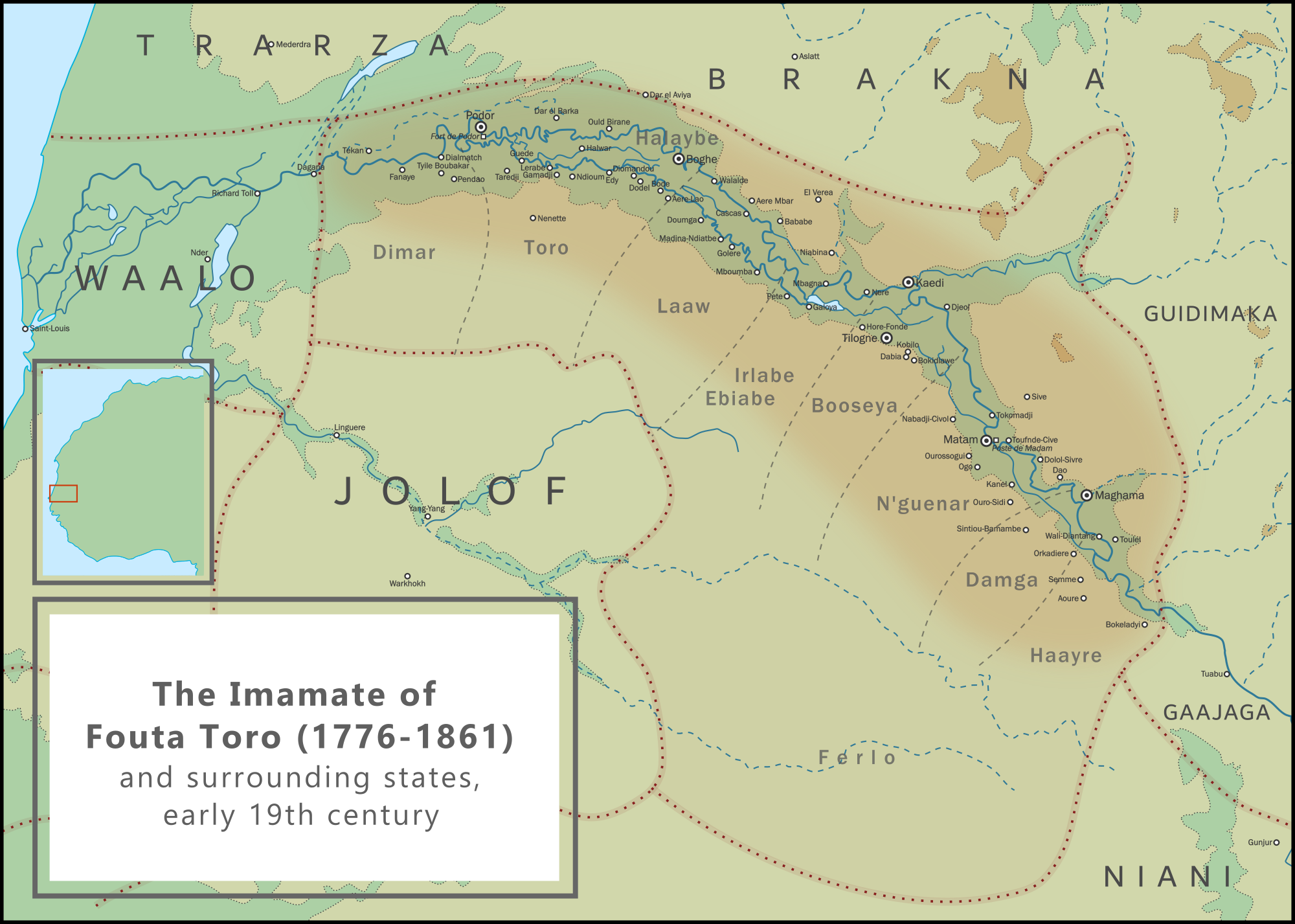
Map of the Imamate of Futa Toro, early 19th century

The Torodbe at first recruited members from all levels of Sūdānī society, particularly the poorer people. Torodbe clerics included people whose origin was Fula, Wolof, Mande, Hausa and Berber. However, they spoke the Fula language, married into Fulbe families, and became the Fulbe scholarly caste.

As with the Zawaya and Mandé clerisies, the early Torodbe clerics were looked down upon by the warrior groups in their societies, which usually had little interest in Islam.

The Torodbe originally lived on charity, as shown by sayings such as "the Torodo is a beggar" and "if the calabash did not exist, the Torodo would not survive". The term Torodo is derived from tooraade, meaning "to ask for alms." The Torodbe lived in settled communities and would not follow any caste-based trade such as being fishermen, smiths, weavers or tanners.

The jihads launched by the Torodbe leaders were in response to declines in Islamic practices coupled with oppression by the ruling classes. They aimed to eliminate relics of traditional religious beliefs, and to elevate Islam from a personal belief into the law of the land, creating theocratic states. After they had taken power it was at first thought that the Torodbe would eventually eliminate obstacles to social movement, perhaps even freeing the slaves. A person would achieve status through Islamic learning and observance of Islamic precepts. In practice, particularly in Futa Toro and Bundu, the Torodbe evolved into a closed society limited to a small number of families. The social stratification between slaves and free people, and between different hereditary occupations, remained unchanged.

The Torodbe established schools where students were taught in Arabic. The mosques they erected in the main towns became the center of religious and.scholarly activity, and also were often administrative centers. Tithes were levied on harvests and inheritances to support the state. The imam headed both the religious and the political organization. He delegated responsibility for security to the amirs who ran the police and army. The Torodbe intelligentsia of the seventeenth and eighteenth centuries were by no means cut off in a backwater. Some of them undertook the pilgrimage to Mecca and then spent many years in countries such as Egypt, where they absorbed a sophisticated understanding of the world and of Islamic thought. They brought this knowledge back with them. Within the Western Sudan, Torodbe clerics would maintain long-distance correspondence over long periods of time.

The religious shaykhs would live on payments they were given in their official or judicial roles, or from fees for their religious services. A shaykh would take care of children while they learned the Quran, but the children were expected to work or beg for the shaykh during this period. Other Torodbe lived through farming or herding, although the work was left to inferiors. Wealth was accumulated in the form of slaves, firearms, cloth and hardware. Some scholastic dynasties emerged from the Torodbe, including Usman dan Fodio's Toronkawa, Seku Amadu's Bari and Omar Saidou Tall's Tall.

== Senegambia ==
The Torodbe provided leadership for a series of jihads in Bundu, Futa Toro, and Futa Jallon in the Senegambia region. (Note: "Futa" is a Fula word meaning a country where people live. So "Futa Toro" is the country of Toro.)

=== Bundu ===
The Torodbe Malick Sy, also spelled Mālik Sī, launched one of the first of the jihads towards the end of the seventeenth century in Bundu. Sy was born into a Torodbe family around 1637 near Podor in Futa Toro. He received formal Islamic training in what is now southern Mauritania. He married, and traveled from place to place trying to live by selling amulets. Sy founded the state of Bundu in the 1690s. The Muslim rulers had authority over village chiefs, whom they could appoint or dismiss. Bundu thereby became a haven for other Torodbe, and expanded eastwards into Bambuk. He was succeeded by Bubu Malik, who died around 1715. Bundu then entered a period of anarchy as the state's neighbors launched attacks while the different communities of Torodbe asserted their autonomy. For a time during the eighteenth century Bundu reverted to pagan rule, but by that time most of the population were Muslim.

=== Futa Jallon ===
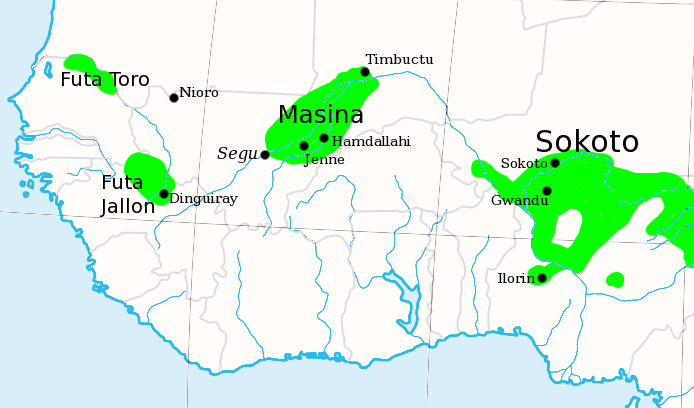
The major Fulbe Jihad states of West Africa, circa 1830. Bundu lay between Toro and Jallon.

The Torodbe influenced the Fulbe of the Futa Jallon, their kinsmen, in embracing a more militant form of Islam. A jihad was launched in the Futa Jallon around 1726 or 1727. The movement was primarily religious, and its leaders included both Mandé and Fulbe marabouts. Karamokho Alfa was elected leader of the jihad. He took the title almami, or "the Imam". Under his leadership the Imamate of Futa Jallon became the first Muslim state to be founded by the Fulbe. In 1751 Ibrahim Sori succeeded Karamokho Alfa. After many years of conflict, Ibrahim Sori achieved a decisive victory in 1776 that consolidated the power of the Fulbe state. The jihad had achieved its goals and Ibrahim Sori assumed the title of almami.

=== Futa Toro ===
The farmers of Futa Toro continued to suffer from attacks by nomads from what is now Mauritania. The jihad in Futa Jalon was followed by a jihad in Futa Toro between 1769 and 1776 led by Sulaymān Baal. In 1776 the Torodbe threw out the ruling Denianke Dynasty. Sulayman died in 1776 and was succeeded by Abdul Kader, a learned teacher and judge who had studied in Cayor.

Abdul Kader became the first Almamy of the theocratic Almamyate of Futa Toro. He encouraged construction of mosques, and pursued an aggressive policy towards his neighbors. Abdul Kader may have prohibited the trade in slaves on the river. In 1785 they obtained an agreement from the French to no longer trade in Muslim slaves and to pay customs duties to the state. Abdul Kader defeated the emirates of Trarza and Brakna to the north, but was defeated and captured when he attacked the Wolof states of Cayor and Waalo. After his release the jihad impetus had been lost. By his death in 1806 the state was dominated by a few elite Torodbe families. Almamys continued to be enthroned in Futa Toro throughout the nineteenth century, but the position had become ceremonial by then.

=== French colonial rule ===
By the mid-nineteenth century, the Torodbe almamis in present.day Senegal had become hereditary oligarchies that imposed a harsh and oppressive rule on the people. The French provided political and economic support to the Torodbe leaders, who in return let the French build fortified posts along the Senegal valley. Jihad leaders in the region who followed the Torodbe revolutionary tradition in the late nineteenth century included Maba Diakhou Bâ in the Kingdom of Sine, Mahmadu Lamine in Senegal and Samori Ture who founded the short-lived Wassoulou Empire in what is now Guinea. These men attempted to overthrow the Europeans and their allies in the cause of Islam, but were eventually defeated by superior forces.

== Eastern states ==
In the nineteenth century several Muslim states arose to the east of the Senegambia region in the Sahel region along the Niger River. The most illustrious leaders to emerge from the Torodbe movement were Usman dan Fodio, who created the Islamic Sokoto Caliphate, and El Hadj Umar Tall who created the short-lived Toucouleur Empire.

=== Sokoto Caliphate ===
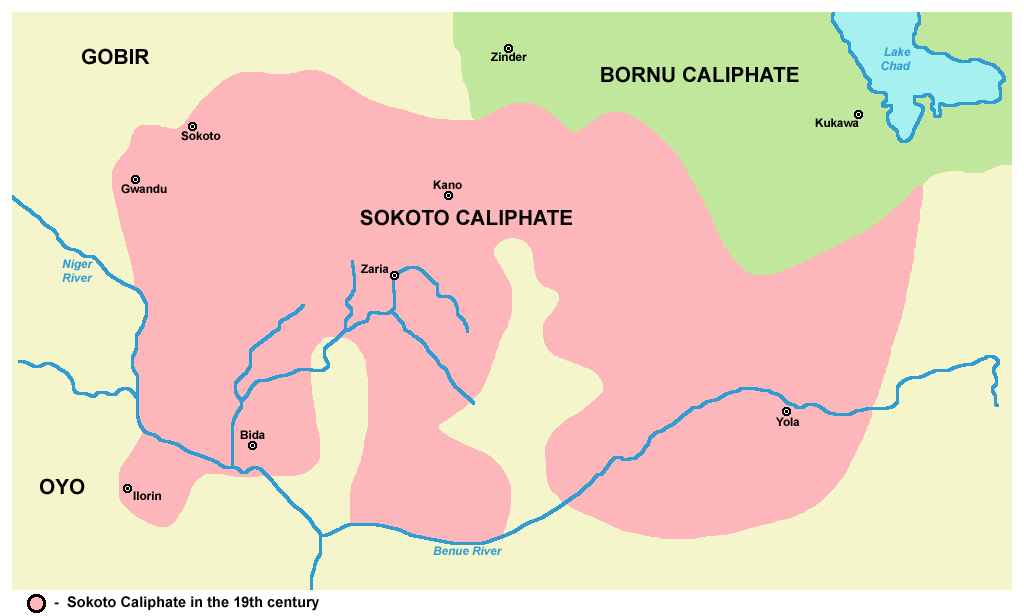
Sokoto Caliphate in the 19th century

The largest of the Fulani jihads was led by the Torodbe scholar Usman dan Fodio and established the Sokoto Caliphate in 1808, stretching across what is now the north of Nigeria. Usman dan Fodio, the Shehu, was born into a Torodbe clan in 1754 near Galmi in northern Hausaland. His family were originally Fulbe nomadic cattle herders who had probably come to Hausaland from the west in the fifteenth century.

Usman dan Fodio learned the Quran by heart. He learned Arabic grammar, verse and metrics and basic Maliki law. He studied rhetoric, history and literature, and became a fluent and educated writer of Arabic. In his early years, Usman dan Fodio was an itinerant mallam, teaching a message of reform against illegal taxation, corruption, pagan ceremonies, unqualified mallams and other abuses and departures from strict Islamic practice.

In 1804 Usman dan Fodio launched a jihad against Gobir which lasted about four years and ended in victory for the Muslims. Shaykh Mukhtar al-Kunti (1729-1811) was an immensely influential reformer who led the Qadiriyya tariqah in West Africa. Shaykh Usman dan Fodio looked up to him as a teacher, and Shaykh Mukhtar reportedly threw his support behind Shaykh Usman in his Sokoto campaign, saying "Usman ibn Fudi is one of the accomplished saints; his djihad is just." Usman established the capital of his new empire in Sokoto. After some inconclusive fighting with the state of Bornu, the jihad wound down by 1810. The Shehu divided his conquests between his brother and his son, and spent the remainder of his life in study and teaching. He died in 1817. The Sokoto Caliphate survived until the British conquest in 1903, when it lost political power. The Sultan of Sokoto is still an important religious figure. When Sa'adu Abubakar was elected Sultan in 2006 he became formal head of the 70 million Muslims in Nigeria.

=== Massina ===
The Fulbe Muslim state of Masina was established to the south of Timbuktu in 1818. Seku Amadu (Shaykh Ahmad Lobbo) was born in a poor family around 1773 at Malanga in the Segu Empire province of Massina. He was pious, honest and unassuming, and became deeply interested in religion, attracting many followers who were influenced by the Islamic movement in Sokoto. In 1816 Uthman dan Fodio gave him the title of Shaykh, and in 1818 he led a revolt against the local rulers.

Early success against the Segu army led to mass conversions of the Fulbe people, and Massina quickly became a strong Muslim state, although warfare with Segu continued for many years. In 1826 the new state took Timbuktu, which was held by Massina until Seku Ahmadu died in 1845. In the conquered territories, fortified Torodbe villages were established to maintain the peace.

=== Liptako Emirate ===
The Liptako Emirate was an early 19th-century Fulani Islamic state in the region where today's Burkina Faso, Mali and Niger meet. At first part of Massina, in 1824 it rebelled and became independent until the French arrived in 1864. Brahima Saidu led the revolt, and his family retained power. The Torodbe, who had opposed the revolt, were given the role of forming an electoral college that would select the amir based on his personal merit, proven abilities, family connections and other factors. One of the Torodbe would swathe the head of newly chosen amir in a turban.

=== Toucouleur Empire ===
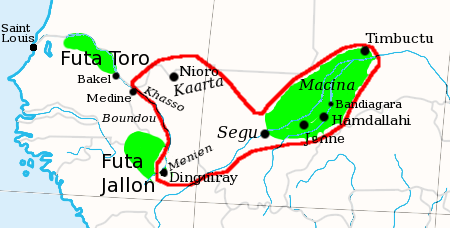
Futa Toro, Futa Djallon and Macina, with the empire of El Hadj Umar Tall outlined in red. Futa Bundu lies between Futa Toro and Jallon.

Around 1827, the Torodbe cleric 'Umar Tall left Futa Toro and made an extended pilgrimage to Mecca. El Hadj 'Umar Tall returned in 1846 and began recruiting for a Jihad. Muhammed Bello, son and heir of Uthman dan Fodio, has been attributed as the author of a poem that praises the glorious exploits of the Banu Toro. Al-Haji 'Umar Tall included the poem in the messages he sent to the leaders of Futa Toro when raising support for his jihad, since it showed that the powerful Fodio family supported his cause. The poem said in part:

These [Banu Toro/Torodbe] are my people; the origin of my clan; ... for the support of Islam they are in league; ... of them are some who excelled in the religious sciences ... and those who defended themselves against the wickedness of the enemy and declared djihād.

'Umar Tall launched his jihad in 1852. His forces succeeded in establishing several states in the Sudan to the east of Futa Toro, but the French under Major Louis Faidherbe prevented him from including Futa Toro into his empire. 'Umar was defeated by the French at Medine in 1857, losing access to the territories further down the Senegal River. In 1860 he concluded a treaty with the French in which he recognized their supremacy in Futa Toro, while he was recognized in Kaarta and Ségou. He then launched an attack on the Muslim state of Massina. A coalition of Muslim states resisted, and in 1864 'Umar was defeated and killed. His followers set up a state based on Hamdullahi which lasted until 1893.

== See also ==
- Omar ibn Said
