= Andrew Marschalk =

American printer (1767–1838)

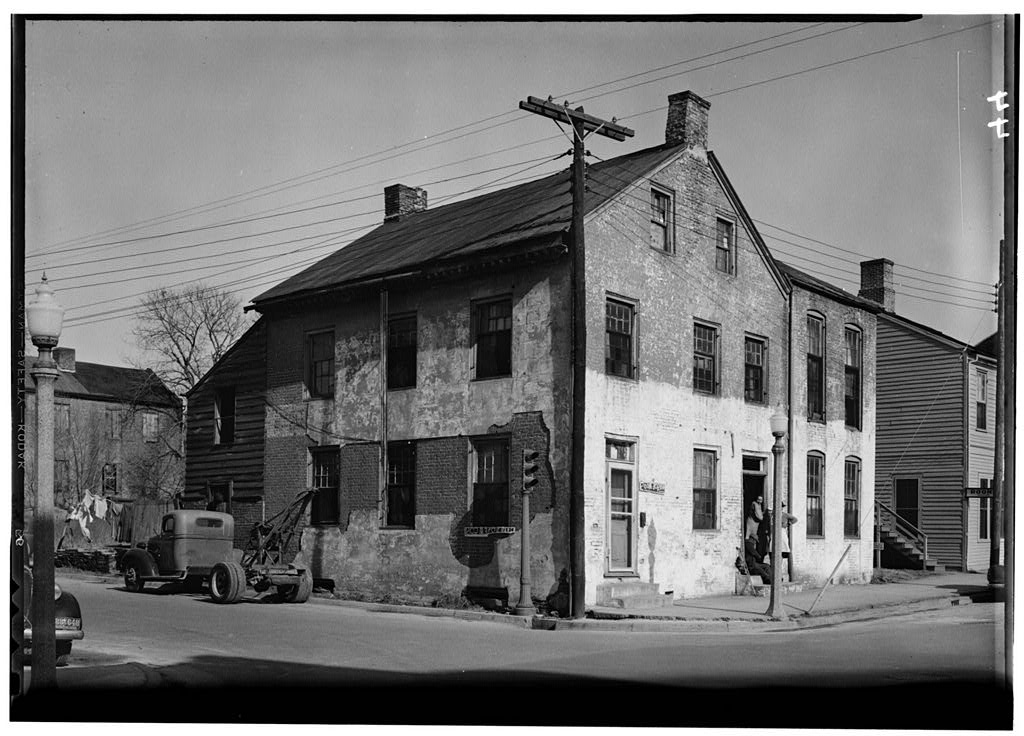
Marschalk Printing Office, Wall & Franklin Streets, Natchez (HABS, 1940)

Andrew Marschalk (February 4, 1767 – August 8, 1838) was a New York-born printer, and the earliest printer to set up shop in Mississippi.

Marschalk learned the printing trade while living in London in the 1780s. He brought a small mahogany press to America in 1790. Marschalk sold this printing press when he joined the United States Army. During his period in the Army he fought Native Americans in the Northwest Territory. After the fighting was over he became a lieutenant in the reserves.

In 1797 Marschalk regained possession of his press. With the printing press and thirty pounds of type he moved to the Mississippi Territory. His first ballad, deemed "The Galley Slave", energized the small town of Natchez, Mississippi. Marschalk's superior felt the printing business was beneath an Army soldier, so Marschalk was ordered to leave Natchez. It was not until 1802 when he was discharged from the army that he returned to Natchez. Marschalk then established The Mississippi Gazette, which was published for six years. He was recommended for a federal appointment to be the Collector of Public Monies, but John Henderson, a Natchez merchant, was chosen instead. Marschalk eventually moved to the nearby town of Washington, Mississippi, where he published The Washington Republican.

For the remaining thirty-six years of his life, he lived in Natchez and Washington, publishing various works. In 1828 Andrew Marschalk found an interest in the case of Abdul Rahman Ibrahima Sori, a Fulani prince who had been enslaved in Natchez for almost 40 years. He began gathering donations and successfully petitioned the Secretary of State, Henry Clay, to help return Abdulrahman to Africa. Marschalk later was alienated by Abdul Rahman’s subsequent tour through northern cities, seeking abolitionist help to raise funds to liberate his children. Attacking Abdul Rahman in print, he extended this criticism to more broad anti-abolitionist attacks against President John Quincy Adams during his 1828 reelection campaign.

He died August 8, 1838, and is buried in Natchez, Mississippi.

== Bibliography ==
- Rand, Clayton. Men of Spine: Marschalk Blazed Trail As First Printer In Our State. November–December 1951.
- Seybert, Tony. “The Natchez Slavery Press and the Road to Disunion, 1800-1865”. I Power Blogger.
