= Soriya =

Political party in Imamate of Futa Jallon

The Soriya was a political party in the Imamate of Futa Jallon in what is now Guinea. Active from the mid-18th century, it supported the successors of the war leader Ibrahim Sori, first cousin of the jihad leader Karamoko Alfa .

It contended with a clerical group, the Alfaya, which supported the successors of Karamoko Alfa. The rivalry between the two groups continued into the 20th century in Guinea.

== See also ==
- Alfaya, political opponents of the Soriya
- Ibrahima Sori, king of the Imamate of Futa Jallon
