= Koine (disambiguation) =

The literal meaning of the Greek word κοινή (koinḗ) is "common". It may refer to:

- Koine Greek, the "common" dialect of Greek used in Hellenistic and Roman antiquity
- Koiné language, a supra-regional form of any language
- Standard Modern Greek, sometimes called "modern Koiné"
- The Yoruba language, also called Standard Yoruba

See also

- Koinon
