= Alkali Mahmud Modibbo =

Nigerian aeronautical engineer and pilot

Alkali Mahmud Modibbo is a Nigerian aeronautical engineer and pilot. He was the rector of the Nigerian College of Aviation Technology from March 2021 to December 2023.

== Career ==
Alkali holds the airline transport pilot licenses of from Federal Aviation Administration, and the Nigerian Civil Aviation Authority. He had also worked as fleet captain at Dornier Aviation Nigeria and Max Air before his appointment by former president Muhammadu Buhari in March 2021. He replaced Capt. Abdulsami Mohammed after the end of the latter's 4-year tenure.

He was removed from office by president Bola Ahmed Tinubu in December 2023.
