= Asadi al-Faya =

Coordinates: 14°57′N 50°16′E

- Interactive map of Asadi al-Faya
- Country: Yemen
- Governorate: Hadhramaut Governorate
- Time zone: UTC+3 (Yemen Standard Time)

Asadi al-Faya is a village in eastern Yemen. It is located in the Hadhramaut Governorate.
