= Alfa Yaya of Labé =

19th-century ruler of the Fula people (1830–1912)

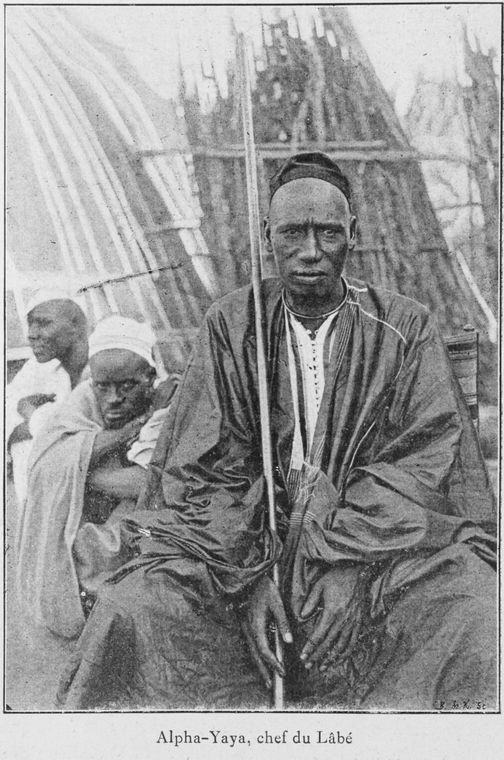
Alpha-Yaya, Chief of Lâbè, c. 1900

Alfa Yaya Diallo Maudo, was a 19th-century ruler of Labé, one of the nine provinces of the Imamate of Futa Jallon (a muslim state ruled by Fula leaders), in present-day Guinea.

Alfa Yaya Diallo was born in the mid-19th century in the village of Fulamori, Guinea. His father was Alfa Ibrahima Diallo, then leader of Labé and a central figure during the siege of Kansala, the capital of the kingdom of Kaabu.

Alfa Yaya rose to power as the French began pushing into the interior of Guinea. He adopted a favorable stance toward the French, using them to enhance his own power. After the French defeated Futa Jallon in 1896, Alfa Yaya signed an accord with them on 10 February 1897. His domains remain theoretically part of Futa Jallon. However, he is able to contact French authorities in regards to his domains without needing the permission of the Almami. His domains thus become effectively independent from the rest of the federation.

Alfa Yaya's relationship with the French went downhill in 1904, when French ceded part of Labé to the control of Portuguese Guinea, effectively taking away part of Alfa Yaya's territory. The government of what was then French Guinea arrested Alfa Yaya the following year and deported him to the French colony of Dahomey in 1905. Though released in 1910, he was again arrested in 1911 and taken to Port Etienne, where he died of scurvy the following year, on 10 August 1912. In 1968 his remains were returned to Guinea. His tomb is at the Camayanne Mausoleum, situated within the gardens of Conakry Grand Mosque.

He was succeeded as head of a much-reduced Labé province in January 1906 by Alfa Alimou.
