= Sulayman Bal =

Sulayman Baal

Shaykh Thierno Sulayman Baal (Arabic: شيخ سليمان بال, c. 1720 - 1775) was an 18th-century African leader, warrior, and Islamic scholar, from the Futa Toro region in what is today Senegal who played a key role in the establishment of the Imamate of Futa Toro.

Suleyman Baal was born around 1720 in Bode. Inspired by the Jihads of Alfa Ibrahima Nuhu who led the Imamate of Futa Jallon, in 1770 Sulayman Baal led a revolt in the Fulani Denyanke kingdom and their backers among the Brakna Moors, who had a long history of dominating and pillaging Futa Toro. An assembly of Torodbe leaders announced the deposition of Sule Bubu Gaissiri, the last Denyanke king, and the introduction of a theocracy headed by an elected Imam (almami), but Baal refused the title. In 1776 he was killed in a battle against the Moors.

Sulayman Baal was succeeded by Abd al-Qadir who consolidated the Futa Toro state, created a military and clerical aristocracy, and became one of the first of many West African leaders to take the title almami. In 1796, his army was defeated during the battle of Bounghoy by the Cayor kingdom led by the Damel Amary Ngoné Ndella Fall. Abd al-Qādir was killed in 1807, to be replaced by a less oligarchic council of clan leaders.
