= Koin, Guinea =

Koin
- Sub-prefecture and town
- Location in Guinea
- Coordinates: 11°13′N 11°49′W
- Country: Guinea
- Region: Labé Region
- Prefecture: Tougué Prefecture

Area
  - Total: 0.964 km^{2} (0.372 sq mi)
  - Land: 0.964 km^{2} (0.372 sq mi)
- Time zone: UTC+0 (GMT)

Koin (Pular: 𞤂𞤫𞤧-𞤯𞤢𞤤𞤭𞥅𞤪𞤫 𞤑𞤮𞤴𞤭𞤲) is a town and sub-prefecture in the Tougué Prefecture in the Labé Region of northern-central Guinea. The town has a total area of about 0,964 square kilometers or 0,372 square miles. Koin was one of the nine Diiwe (provinces) of the theocratic Kingdom of Fuuta Jaloo.
