= Modibo Tounty Guindo =

Modibo Tounty Guindo is a magistrate who serves the Malian Ministry of Justice and sits on the African Court on Human and Peoples' Rights.

He has acted as technical counsel to the Ministry of Justice and served as a member of the Malian delegation to the 2003 Conference of Governmental Structures responsible for Human Rights in the French-speaking zone.
