= Alfaya (party) =

Political party in Imamate of Futa Jallon

The Alfaya was a political party in the Imamate of Futa Jallon in what is now Guinea. Active from the mid-18th century, it favored the clerical successors of the jihad leader Karamoko Alfa.

The party contended with a military group, the Soriya, which supported the successors of the war leader Ibrahim Sori. The rivalry between the two groups continued into the 20th century in Guinea.

== See also ==
- Soriya, political opponents of the Alfaya
- Karamokho Alfa, Fula religious leader
