= Ibrahima Sori =

King of the Imamate of Futa Jallon

- Died: 1784
- Occupation: Political leader
- Known for: Commander of the Faithful

Ibrahima Sori Barry Mawdo (Note: Ibrahima Sori Barry Mawdo: The nickname "Sori", meaning "early riser", refers to his habit of undertaking attacks before dawn. Barry (sometimes given as 'Pure') was the name of his family. "Mawdo" is an honorific, meaning "The Great".) or Ibrahim Sori (died c. 1784) was a Fula leader of the Imamate of Futa Jallon in what is now Guinea in West Africa from around 1751 to 1784.

== Background ==
In the second half of the 18th century a militant Islamic movement began in the Sudan region to the south of the Sahara, stretching from the Senegal to the Nile. The leaders waged jihad, or holy war, against pagans and less strict Muslims, establishing a string of strictly Muslim states across the region. The first jihad was launched in Fouta Djallon in 1726 by Ibrahima Musa. He was a leading Muslim cleric who had studied in Kankan.

Ibrahima Musa, also known as Ibrahima Sambeghu, Karamokho Alfa or Alfa Ibrahima, enlisted the support of gangs of young men, slaves and outlaws in his fight against the ruling powers. He became recognized as the "Commander of the Faithful" at a time when the Fulani were gaining supremacy over the Jalonke people in a Jihad, although he had to contend with competing families and with squabbling clerics and military leaders. The Jalonke people adopted the Muslim religion and achieved some social status, but remained subordinate to the Fula leaders. The jihad process was protracted, because the Fula were not simply taking over an existing state, but were building a new state. Alfa Ibrahima died in 1751.

== Struggle for power ==
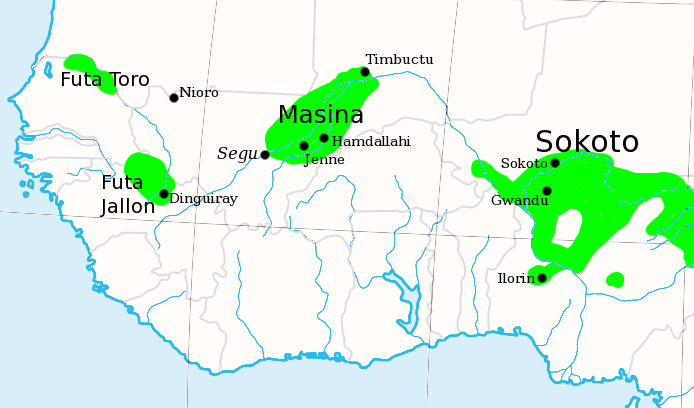
Fula Jihad states around 1830 - Fouta Djallon to the west

Ibrahima Sori was Alfa Ibrahima's cousin. He succeeded Alfa Ibrahima on the latter's death and consolidated the Fulani military authority. His motives were more commercial than religious. He threw his energy into taking control of all trade, which at that time primarily consisted of trading slaves for European fabric, iron and weapons. Sori promoted warfare as a means to gain more slaves, joining forces with the king of the Dyalonke people of Solima.

In 1762 the combined Fulani and Solima forces invaded the territory of the animist Wassoulou to their west and were defeated. The alliance between the Fulani and Solima broke up. The Solima allied themselves with the Wasulunke against the Fulani, and began annual raids into Fulani territory. In 1776 they were decisively defeated by the Fulani under Ibrahima Sori, and the Solima had to accept Fulani supremacy.

== Almami ==
After the victory over the Solima, Ibrahima Sori adopted the title almami. He became known as Sori Maudo ("Sori the Great"). Although he was the leader of the Fulani, he had to respect the advice of a council of elders, and had to accept that the council would confirm his successors. The council also collected tithes and booty to cover the costs of the jihad, and enforced the Shari's laws. Under Ibrahima Sori the theocratic state was organized into nine provinces, each led by a cleric who was subordinate to Sori as almami. The almami was formally installed in Fugumba, the religious capital, but ruled from Timbo, the political capital, with the help of the council.

The council became jealous of Ibrahima Sori's power and prestige, and began agitating against him. Sori entered Fugumba, executed the councillors who had opposed him, and called a general assembly to confirm his authority. The packed assembly duly voted in his favor, and the military faction was firmly in control until Sori's death in 1791-1792. He was succeeded by his son Sa'id, who held office until 1797-1798 when he was killed and replaced by a descendant of Karamokho Alfa. Two other sons, Abdul Qadir and Yahya, subsequently held the office of almami. The original Fulani leaders retained the right to elect the almami, who was usually a either clerical descendant of Alfa Ibrahima or a more secular and military descendant of Ibrahima Sori.

== See also ==
- Abdul Rahman Ibrahima Sori, one of his sons; held in slavery in the U.S., in Natchez Mississippi.

== Notes and references ==
Notes

Citations

Sources

- Barry, Boubacar (1997-12-13). Senegambia and the Atlantic Slave Trade. Cambridge University Press. p. 98. ISBN 978-0-521-59760-9.
- Bayol, M. (1882). "La France au Fouta-Djalon". Revue des Deux Mondes. 54 (4): 902–932. JSTOR 44753013.
- Fage, J. D.; Tordoff, William (2002). A History of Africa. Routledge. ISBN 978-0-415-25248-5.
- Gray, Richard (1975-09-18). The Cambridge History of Africa. Cambridge University Press. p. 209. ISBN 978-0-521-20413-2.
- Lapidus, Ira M. (2002-08-22). A History of Islamic Societies. Cambridge University Press. ISBN 978-0-521-77933-3.
- Martin, Guy (2012-12-24). African Political Thought. Palgrave Macmillan. ISBN 978-1-4039-6634-6.
- O'Toole, Thomas; Baker, Janice E. (2005-03-16). Historical Dictionary of Guinea. Scarecrow Press. p. 185. ISBN 978-0-8108-6545-7.
- Trimingham, J. Spencer; Bagley, F.R, C (1969). "Islam in Sub-Saharan Africa, till the 19th century". the muslim world a historical survey Part III the last great muslim empires. Brill Archive. GGKEY:W5U5KXGDL7F.
