= Timbo, Guinea =

Timbo
- Sub-prefecture and town
- Location in Guinea
- Coordinates: 10°38′N 11°50′W
- Country: Guinea
- Region: Mamou Region
- Prefecture: Mamou Prefecture
- Time zone: UTC+0 (GMT)

Timbo is a town and sub-prefecture in the Mamou Prefecture in the Mamou Region of Guinea. It is located in the Fouta Djallon highlands of Guinea, lying north east of Mamou, in a part of the country mostly occupied by the Fula people. It is also known for its vernacular architecture, for the local mountains and for local chimpanzees.

== History ==
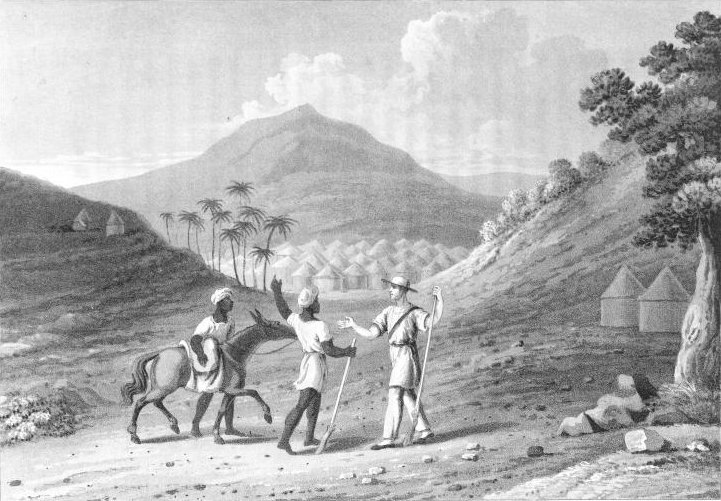
Timbo in 1818

Karamokho Alfa, who led the Fulani Jihad that established the Imamate of Futa Jallon between 1727 and 1751, was the ruler of Timbo, which became the capital of the new state. It was an important religious centre and is known for its eighteenth-century mosque.

Abdul Rahman Ibrahima Sori was from Timbo.
