= Almami =

Title of Tukulor monarchs

Almami (Arabic: المامي; Also: Almamy, Almaami) was the regnal name of Tukulor monarchs from the eighteenth century through the first half of the twentieth century. It is derived from the Arabic Al-Imam, meaning "the leader", and it has since been claimed as the title of rulers in other West African theocratic monarchies.

== Famous holders of the title ==
- Ibrahim Sori, Imamate of Futa Jallon.
- Karamokho Alfa, Imamate of Futa Jallon
- Bokar Biro, Imamate of Futa Jallon
- Almamy Ahmadou of Timbo
- Almany Niamody of the Toucouleur vassal state of Kaarta.
- Samori Ture of the Wassoulou Empire.
- Maba Diakhou Bâ, almamy of Rip in the Saloum region of Senegal.

== Places ==
- Almami Rural LLG in Papua New Guinea

== Proper name ==
In recent times the word has become a proper name in some areas of West Africa in honor of the historical figures known by the title. Malian independence leader Almamy Sylla and Guinean football player Almamy Schuman Bah are examples.
