= Ndaté Yalla Mbodj =

Ndate Yalla Mbodj
- Lingeer
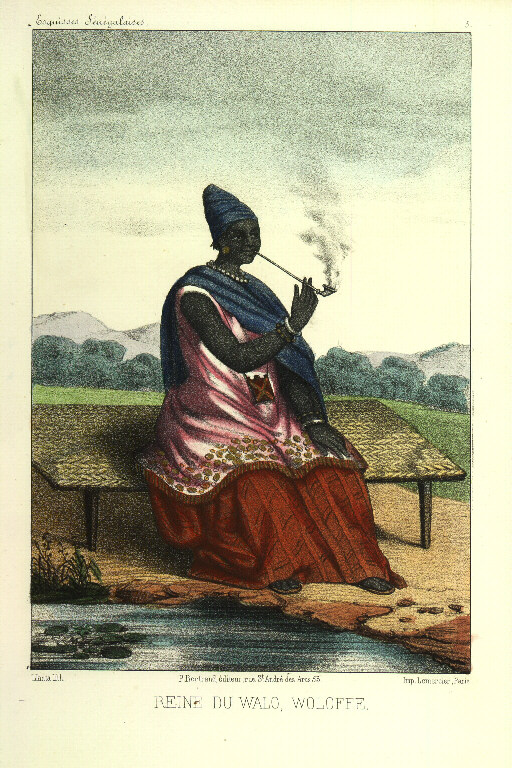
- Senegal-reine-du-walo

Co-ruling Queen (Lingeer) of Waalo
- Reign: 1846—1855
- Predecessor: Ndjeumbeut Mbodj (sister)
- Successor: Monarchy abolished
- King: Maalik Mboj
- Born: c. 1810 or c. 1814; Waalo
- Died: 1860 or 1856; Dagana
- Spouse: Yerim Mbanyik (King of Waalo); Marosso Tassé Diop (Prince of Cayor and Lord of Koki)
- Issue: Sidia Diop (Note: Variations: Siddya Joop, Sidia Ndatte Diop, Sidia Ndaté Diop, Sidia Ndahte Diop, Sidya Leon Diop, Sidia Lêon Diop, etc.) (Prince of Cayor and Waalo)
- Dynasty: Mbodj (paternal line); Tedyek (maternal line)
- Father: Brak Amar Fatim Borso Mbodj
- Mother: Lingeer—Awo Fatim Yamar Khuri Yaye Mbodj

Ndaté Yalla Mbodj, also known as Ndateh Yalla Mbooj (c. 1810 — 1860 or c. 1814—1856), was the last Lingeer (Queen) of Waalo, a Jolof kingdom located in what is now northwest Senegal. During her reign, she fought against French colonization and Moorish invasion of her kingdom. Ndaté Yalla and her sister Ndjeumbeut Mbodj were two of the most powerful women of 19th century Senegalese dynastic history.

== Ancestry ==
Ndaté Yalla's father Amar Fatim Borso belonged to the Joos Maternal Dynasty, which was one of the reigning Houses of Waalo at the time. The kingdom was ruled by the Mbodj (or Mbooj) paternal dynasty — direct paternal descendants of Barka Bo, the first Brak of Waalo and maternal half-brother of Ndiadiane Ndiaye, founder of the Jolof Empire. According to legend, Barka Bo and Ndiadiane's mother was Fatoumata Sall, daughter of the Lamtoro of Futa Abraham Sall, a Toucouleur.The position of “Lam toro”, however, did not exist in the 13th and 14th centuries, when Ndiaye supposedly ruled, but was a contemporary feature to Koli Tenguella in the 16th century. The legend could have been an attempt by the Wolofs to incorporate other ethnicities into the myth of Ndiadiane Ndiaye to make them more comfortable with being vassals of the Jolof empire. Barka Mbodj was the son of Mbarick Mbodj. Mbarick Mbodj was an ancestor of Ndaté Yalla Mbodj.

On the maternal side, all the kings or queens of Waalo had to belong to one of three maternal dynasties or royal houses that had ruled over Waalo for nearly 600 years. Wolof men from the royal family of Waalo married women who had multi-ethnic ancestry from the following maternal lineages:Tedyek (of Fula or Berber origin), Loggar (of Moorish origin) and Joos (of Serer origin). Ndaté Yalla's father belonged to the Joos Maternal Dynasty, and a direct maternal descendant of Lingeer Ndoye Demba - a Serer Princess of Sine, matriarch and founder of the Joos Dynasty of Waalo and Queen of that kingdom, herself the maternal grand daughter of Lingeer Fatim Beye - a Serer Queen of Sine. Thus, Ndaté Yalla was related to the Joof and Faye royal families that had ruled Sine and Saloum.

On Ndaté Yalla's maternal side, she belonged to the Tedyek (or Teejeg) matriclan through her mother Fatim Yamar Khuri Yaye (or Faatim Yamar Xuuri Yaay). Lingeer Guet May Beut is their ancestor and matriarch of that House. Dégèune Mbodj is the ancestor and matriarch of the Loggars. In the Wolof Kingdoms, and in the Serer kingdoms of Sine and Saloum prior to their Islamization, the lingeer, whether ruling in her own right as queen regnant or as the wife of a king (queen consort) had to be crowned lingeer just as the king was crowned brak.

== Early life and Family ==
Most historians cite Ndaté Yalla as being born in c. 1810 (or 1814 according to François-Xavier Fauvelle), the youngest daughter of the powerful and controversial Brak (King) of Waalo Amar Fatim Borso Mbodj, and the Lingeer-Awo Fatim Yamar Khuri Yaye Mbodj. The Lingeer—Awo was the first and most powerful wife of the king, and one of the most powerful women along with the king's mother and/or sister, the Lingeer. Her elder sister was Ndjeumbeut Mbodj, who would precede Ndaté Yalla as Lingeer.

Ndaté Yalla's father Amar Fatim Borso died in January 1826 when Ndaté Yalla and her sister Ndjeumbeut were young. He was especially known for his anti-Islamic stance against the Senegalese Muslim jihadists at the time — especially Almamy Biran of Futa Toro, and for his famous line "A Brak should never convert to Islam".

When Ndaté Yalla was just over 16 years of age, she married her cousin and King of Waalo, Brak Yerim Mbanyik Tigereleh Mbodj (or Yerim Mbagnik Tegg Rell). That marriage was however a political one in order to advance Tedyek power.

Ndaté Yalla would go on to remarry to Sakoura Barka Diop, better known as Marosso Tassé Diop, (Note: Many variations, including: Maaroso Tassé or Maroso Tasse) a Prince of Cayor and Lord of Koki, who was a relative of Lat Dior Diop (future King of Cayor and Baol) and Sayerr Jobe - founder of Sere Kunda in the Gambia. Marosso Tassé, a warrior noble of Cayor would go on to command his wife's army against Moorish and eminent French threat in years to come. From that marriage, they had Sidia Diop. Marosso Tassé was also a rather powerful and influential figure in Waalo, known for being a valiant warrior.

== Reign ==
Queen Ndate was crowned Lingeer of Waalo on 1 October 1846 in Nder, the capital. She succeeded her elder sister Ndjeumbeut Mbodj, reigning as Lingeer from 1846 to 1855 (the year Waalo fell to the French).

In early 1847, she opposed the French authorities over free passage for the Sarakoles (Soninkes) who supplied the island of Saint-Louis (a French colony) with cattle. The French claimed that the Lingeer and/or her people, in contravention of the treaty that had existed between Waalo and Saint-Louis, stopped a herd of 160 oxen that a French resident of Saint-Louis had bought and kept 16 of the best livestock for themselves, allowing only 100 to pass. The French went on to state that the Lingeer can only be paid for passage after the goods have arrived in Saint-Louis, and to threaten her and ask that she return the 16 oxen which they say were in her possession, and if she refuse to do so she will be deemed an enemy.

The Queen viewed the threat as an affront to her sovereignty and the sovereignty of Waalo. On 18 June 1847, she wrote a letter to the French governor in the following terms:

We have wronged no one. Walo belongs to us, that is why we guarantee the passage of livestock in our country. For this reason we charge one-tenth and we shall never accept any other thing. Saint-Louis belongs to the Governor, Cayor to the Damel, Djollof to the Bourba, Fouta to the Almamy and Walo to the Brak. Each of these chiefs governs his country the way he deems fit.

— Ndaté Yalla Mbodj (18 June 1847),

During her reign as Lingeer, she and her husband Maaroso Tassé (commander of her army) fought against the Moors of Trarza who were encroaching on her territory and against the French colonial army led by General Louis Faidherbe - who has just been brought in (1854) to replace his predecessor Governor Protet. Their years of resistance against colonization resulted in attacks from 1854 and finally the Battle of Dioubouldy (or Diouboulou or Dyubuldu) in 1855. Maaroso Tassé, the Prince of Cayor and Lord of Koki, and commander of the Waalo army, put up a strong resistance against the French. The battle went on for several months. This battle was the first real attempt by France to conquer territory in Senegambia and bring to an end the six main Senegambian Kingdoms (Waalo, Sine, Saloum, Baol, Cayor and Jolof) and their respective royal dynasties that had reigned for centuries. Waalo was also close to Saint Louis (a French stronghold). Therefore, Faidherbe decided to exercise his authority first with Waalo. if Waalo fell, it would have been the first of the Senegambian kingdoms to fall, and although it did, it was not as easy as the French thought it was going to be.

After several skirmishes, Maroso Tassé and his wife refused to submit to French invasion and mobilized more forces in order to repulse the French army. In February 1855, Faidherbe departed from Saint-Louis with a force of 450 French soldiers and 400 armed volunteers in order to march on Nder, Ndaté's capital. On 25 February at the Battle of Dioubouldy, the French defeated the combined Waalo and Trarza armies. The French then entered Nder, which had been deserted by the Queen and her followers, and burned it down. Maroso Tassé and his warriors still held firm and refused to submit. The Queen who was receiving updates still remained defiant. On 31 January 1855, Faidherbe finally defeated the Queen and gained control of Waalo. Having been defeated, the Queen gave the following speech in front of her dignitaries:

Today we are invaded by the conquerors. Our army is completely routed. The Tiedo [animist army] of Walo, valiant warriors though they are, have almost all fallen to the bullet of the enemy. The invader is stronger than we are, I know, but should we abandon Walo to the hands of foreigners?

— Ndaté Yalla Mbodj (31 January 1855),

Maaroso Tassé Diop lost many of his men in battle. For him and his wife, their defeat was the ultimate "defeat" and "humiliation in a country which had known only glory and honour." In addition to that, their young son was held hostage by the French, baptized a Christian, given the name Lêon, and sent to a French school abroad. He would later request a return to his country and launch a campaign of attacks against the French. In light of their crushing defeat, with the advice of the Jogomay, Jawdin and Maalo (the three powerful noble council of electors responsible for electing the kings and queens of Waalo from the ruling family) and Maaroso Tassé's relatives in the royal family of Cayor, requested that the royal couple move to Cayor for refuge and protection. They left for Cayor, and received protection from their relatives. The French demanded that the royal family of Cayor hand them over as their prisoners, and if they refuse to do so Cayor would be deemed an enemy. The royal family of Cayor refused to do so and offered them protection. The Queen remained in Cayor until her death in 1860.

Despite their defeat and the total humiliation of their monarch, the Cheddos (or Tiedos) of Waalo, devout followers of Traditional African religion were determined not to relinquish their country to the French so easily. Knowing that their national army and commander had been completely routed, the Tiedos (animists) decided to destroy the infrastructure and the economic base that the French as well as the locals depended on - similar to what the Serers of Sine would do four years later following the Battle of Logandème.

== Legacy ==
Lingeer Ndaté Yalla Mbodj is one of the most famous lingeers of Senegambian dynastic history. She was not a puppet, but was the signatory or co-signatory of many official documents between Waalo and France. Immortalized in a sketch by David Boilat, she is one of the very few Senegambian precolonial nobles depicted visually. Like her sister Ndjeumbeut, whom she succeeded in 1846, Ndaté Yalla was famous for three things: her political strength; her marriages and her son Sidia Diop. The French first took notice of her in 1841 when she was the widow of Brak Yerim Mbanick. Ndaté Yalla's son Sidia, continued his parents’ anti-colonialist work until he was captured and exiled to Gabon in 1878.

Ndaté Yalla Mbodj, is regarded as a heroine in Senegambian history, and one of the most famous women of 19th century Senegambia. Along with several other African heroines, she played a crucial role in the struggle for African liberation. Oral historians (also known as griots) have recorded her bravery, and she remains a symbol of female empowerment and resistance against French colonialism. Queen Ndate Yalla Mbodj died in Dagana, where a statue erected in her honor still stands.

Her mother was one of those women who committed martyrdom at Talaata-i-Ndeer in the name of honour by burning themselves alive.

A primary school in Saint-Louis bears her name, as well as one of the taxi-boats that runs from Dakar to Rufisque.

== Bibliography ==
- Adandé, Alexis; Arinze, Emmanuel; Arinze, E. N.; West African Museums Programme; Museums & urban culture in West Africa, Published on behalf of the West African Museums Programme in association with the International African Institute [by] James Currey (2002), p. 145-6, ISBN 9780852552766
- Adandé, Alexis; Arinze, Emmanuel; Arinze, E. N.; West African Museums Programme; Museums & urban culture in West Africa, Published on behalf of the West African Museums Programme in association with the International African Institute [by] James Currey (2002), p. 149 ISBN 9780852552759
- Afrique Histoire U.S., Volume 3, Afrique histoire U.S. (1985), p. 32
- Archives nationales du Sénégal 13 G 91, Correspondance des chefs du Waalo, Lettre N°61 adressée à la Linguére Ndaté Yalla par le Gouverneur de Saint -Louis
- Barry, Boubacar, Le royaume du waalo, le Sénégal avant la conquête, F. Maspéro (1972), p 261
- Barry, Boubacar, Le Royaume du Waalo: le Sénégal avant la conquête, KARTHALA Editions (1985), pp 73, 275–282, 312–30 ISBN 2865371417 / ISBN 9782865371419 (Retrieved 20 July 2019)
- Barry, Boubacar, Senegambia and the Atlantic Slave Trade (editors: David Anderson, and Carolyn Brown; trans: Ayi Kwei Armah; contributors: David Anderson, American Council of Learned Societies, Carolyn Brown, University of Michigan. Digital Library Production Service, Christopher Clapham, Michael Gomez, Patrick Manning, David Robinson, Leonardo A. Villalon), Cambridge University Press (1998), pp. 11, 182, ISBN 9780521592260 (Retrieved 20 July 2019)
- Brigaud, Félix, Histoire du Sénégal: Des origines aux traités de protectorat, Clair-afrique (1964), p 16.
- Fauvelle-Aymar, François-Xavier; Bertrand, Hirsch; Les ruses de l'historien: Essais d'Afrique et d'ailleurs en hommage à Jean Boulègue, KARTHALA Editions (2013), p. 240, ISBN 9782811109400 (Retrieved 20 July 2019)
- Le Mois en Afrique, Numéros 235 à 246, Le Mois en Afrique (1985), p. 148
- M'bayo, Tamba Eadric, African Interpreters, Mediation, and the Production of Knowledge in Colonial Senegal: The Lower and Middle Senegal Valley, Ca. 1850s to Ca. 1920s, Volume 2. Michigan State University. History (2009), p. 208
- Messiant, Christine Premières dames en Afrique, KARTHALA Editions (2004), p. 1908, ISBN 9782845865785 (Retrieved 21 July 2019)
- Sane, Anta (June 2015). "Gender Inequality in the Process of Good Governance: The Case of the Senegalese Parliament" (PDF). CODESRIA.
- Sarr, Alioune, Histoire du Sine-Saloum. Introduction, bibliographie et Notes par Charles Becker, BIFAN, Tome 46, Serie B, n° 3–4, 1986–1987, pp. 28–30
- Seye, El Hadji Amadou, Walo Brack, Les éditions Maguilen (Dakar, 2007), p. 204
- « Wade, Amadou, Chronique du Waalo, commenté par Vincent Monteil, 1966 » [in] Sall, Ibrahima Abou, Mauritanie du Sud: conquêtes et administration coloniales françaises, 1890–1945, KARTHALA Editions (2007), p 49, note 20. ISBN 2845868650 (Retrieved 20 July 2019)
- West African Museums Programme, International African Institute, Bulletin, Issue 7, International African Institute, London School of Economics (1997), p. 35
