= Ngoné Dièye =

Lingeer of Cayor and Baol

Lingeer Ngoné Dièye (Lingeer Ngoone Jaay)
- Lingeer of Cayor and Baol
- Reign: 1697 (as Queen Mother)
- Born: Kingdom of Baol
- Spouse: Teigne Thié Yasin Demba Noudj Fall
- Issue: Damel—Teigne Lat Soukabé Ngoné Fall (not the only issue).
Names
- Lingeer Ngoné Dièye
- House: Geej

Lingeer Ngoné Dièye (Serer: Lingeer Ngoone Jaay, or Lingeer Ngoneh Jaay) was a Lingeer from the Serer Kingdom of Saloum, and ancestor of the Guedj (Wolof: Géej; Serer: Geej) maternal dynasty of Cayor and Baol. She was the wife of the 17th century Senegalese noble and Teigne Thié Yasin Demba Noudj Fall, and mother of Damel—Teigne Lat Soukabé Ngoné Fall who ruled Cayor and Baol from 1697 to 1719, the first Guedj to do so, after overthrowing the reigning maternal dynasty and installing his mother's matriclan. In usurping the throne, he committed fratricide by killing his paternal half-brother (the reigning king) and took his throne.

Ngoné Dièye was a Wolof noble of the Dièye family of Baol, originating from Gandiole. She became Lingeer of Cayor and Baol when her son usurped the thrones and unified the two kingdoms. According to Cheikh Anta Diop, "The Guedj come from common people. They are distinguished by their adaptive ability and their military genius. The dynasty is named for the country of origin of the first founding Damel's mother. She was a commoner from the seacoast, who married the King; guedj meaning "sea" in Wolof. Her son, though he had no right to the throne, succeeded in being crowned, through his energy and mental agility."

In 1697, the newly appointed French Director General of Trade in Senegal, André Brue, established a cordial relationship with Lingeer Ngoné Dièye. The Queen Mother regarded André as young enough to be her son, and referred to him as such. In one of her secret correspondences with André, she mediated between her own son (Lat Soukabé) and the French, and asked the French to ignore her son's ourbursts and insults. The Queen Mother intervened regularly during the reign of her son in an attempts to curb his excesses with the French.

For several centuries until the French conquest of Baol and Cayor, Lingeer Ngoné Dièye's descendants dominated the political scene of Cayor and Baol. She was the matriarch and direct maternal ancestor of all the Guedj kings of the two states during this period, including the Senegalese hero Lat Dior.

== See also ==
- Lingeer Fatim Beye
- Lingeer Ndoye Demba
- Ndaté Yalla Mbodj
- Njembot Mbodj
- Serer maternal clans
- Joos Maternal Dynasty
- Joof family
- Faye family

== Bibliography ==
- IFAN (1976), Bulletin de l'Institut français d'Afrique noire: Sciences humaines, Volume 38, p. 480
- Buschinger, Danielle, (ed: Jan Willem Kloos; trans: Jan Willem Kloos), pp. 45-46, 51, Van den vos Reynaerde: mittelniederländisch - neuhochdeutsch, Presses du Centre d'Etudes médiévales Université de Picardie (1992), ISBN 9782901121169
- Diop, Cheikh Anta, Precolonial Black Africa, (trans. Harold Salemson), Chicago Review Press (1988), p. 150, ISBN 9781613747452 (retrieved February 28, 2020)
- Labat, Jean-Baptiste, Nouvele Relation de l’Afrique Occidentale, (Paris: Guilliame Cavelier, 1728), p. 146.
- Fall, R., (1997), Les souverains sénégambiens et la traite négrièrè: Lat Sukaabe Ngoné Dièye et André Brue, p. 11
- Anta, Babou Cheikh, Le Jihad de l'âme. Ahmadou Bamba et la fondation de la Mouridiyya au Sénégal (1853-1913), KARTHALA Editions (2011), p. 59, ISBN 9782811133788 (retrieved February 28, 2020)
