= Battle of Leybar Bridge =

- Part of the Second Franco-Trarza War
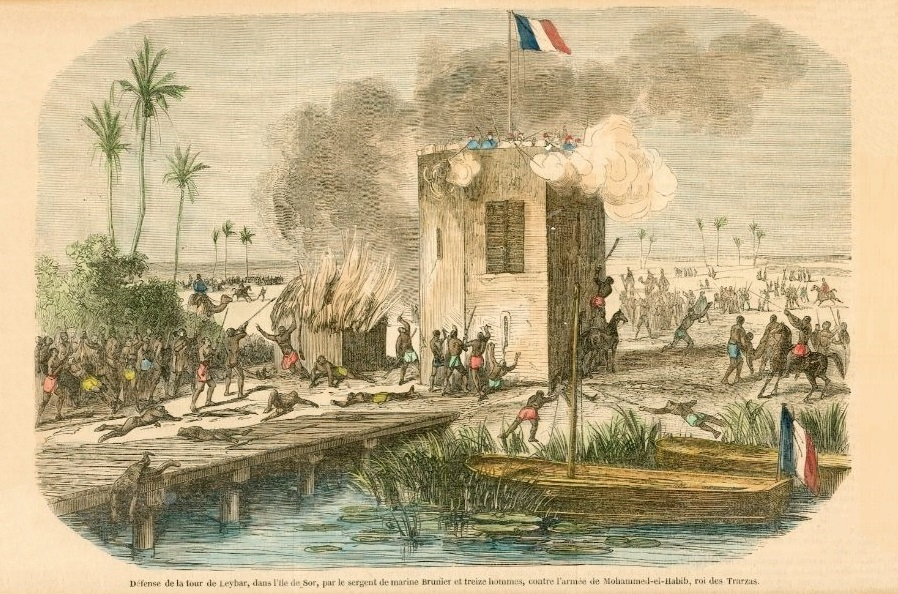
- The defense of the tower of Leybar Bridge
Date	21 April 1855
Location	Outskirts of Saint-Louis, Senegal 15.9807°N 16.4831°W
Result	French victory

Belligerents
France	Emirate of Trarza

Commanders and leaders
Sergeant Brunier	Mohammed al-Habib

Strength
14 soldiers	Over 1,000 warriors

Casualties and losses
3 wounded	127 killed or wounded

The Battle of Leybar Bridge was fought on 21 April 1855 between the Trarza army of Mohammed al-Habib and the French garrison of the tower on Leybar Bridge, outside of Saint-Louis in the French colony of Senegal, during the Second Franco-Trarza War.

== Background ==
After his striking victory against a combined Trarza-Waalo force in late February 1855, French governor Louis Faidherbe tried to negotiate a peace with Emir Mohammed al-Habib, in which he demanded the abolition of taxes paid by France to the Trarza for the right to use the Senegal River, the end of Trarza raids on Waalo and the renunciation of the claim the Emir's son had on the throne of Waalo. The Emir responded that his own conditions were the increase of existing taxes, the removal of all French forts alongside the river, the establishment of new taxes and the dismissal of Faidherbe as governor.

On 12 April 1855, following a Trarza attack against the French outpost of Richard Toll, Faidherbe departed from Saint-Louis with 1,500 men, virtually the entirety of French forces in Senegal, for a punitive expedition in Trarza territory. Upon finding out about the French expedition, the Emir decided to bring his forces to Saint-Louis to attack the undefended city.

== Battle ==
The bridge of Leybar was at the time the only link between the mainland and the city of Saint-Louis. At the entrance of the bridge stood a small fortified tower, containing one cannon.

On 21 April a little past 7:00 am, the Trarza army, which counted over 1,000 warriors, came in sight of the bridge. The garrison of the tower consisted in 14 men of 4th Marine Infantry Regiment: Sgt. Henri Brunier, 11 infantrymen and 2 artillerymen. After having let in a small group of panicked native civilians, they sealed up the tower and readied themselves to fight the attackers. The Trarza were quite surprised to find this unexpected fortification, which had been built only recently and thus wasn't there the last time they had come to the city during peace time diplomatical visits. Nonetheless, this wasn't enough to deter them and the Emir, who was well aware of the absence of the French army, had bragged in front of his men that they would all get to triumphally perform their salat in the Cathedral of Saint-Louis as conquerors on that same day.

Trarza warriors soon swarmed up the area around the fortified building. A small shack beside the tower which served as kitchen for the garrison was set on fire by the Trarza, and a civilian woman who had hidden inside perished in the flames. The attackers furiously assailed the fortification. Some attempted to fire into the small loopholes with their rifles while some others unsuccessfully tried to damage the tower's structure with their swords and daggers. Despite the thick smoke emanating from the burning shack and the terrified screams of the civilians on the lower floor, the fourteen French marines kept their composure and methodically fired at their numerous enemies without wasting ammunition. The defenders were resolute to fight to the very end and agreed with each other's that they would blow up the whole building by igniting the powder reserve if the attackers somehow managed to break in or climb up the tower.

A little before midday, a French artillery round fell dangerously close to the Emir who was watching the battle from a somewhat remote spot. Shocked by the experience, as well as worried about his increasingly heavy losses and anxious with the potential return of the main French force, Emir Mohammed al-Habib finally ordered the retreat after nearly five hours of fighting. The Trarza army withdrew back to Rosso on the same path it had arrived, bringing back with them a large number of wounded. Among the wounded was the son of the Prince Bethio Chakoura, an important ally of the Trarza.

== Aftermath ==
Through its resilient defense of the bridge, the small garrison had single-handedly saved the city of Saint-Louis. Fallen Trarza warriors littered the ground outside of the tower. Among the dead were two of the Emir's close relatives as well as his main minister. French casualties amounted to three wounded, including Sergeant Brunier.

The French garrison spent the next day burning the many corpses that cluttered the ground, with the help of some local civilians. Governor Faidherbe and the French forces returned from their expedition two days later on 23 April, with a large number of cattle taken in Trarza lands.

For their heroic defense of the bridge, Sergeant Brunier was awarded the Legion of Honour while his men were awarded the Médaille Militaire.
