= Fatim Beye =

Lingeer Fatim Beye
- Lingeer of Sine
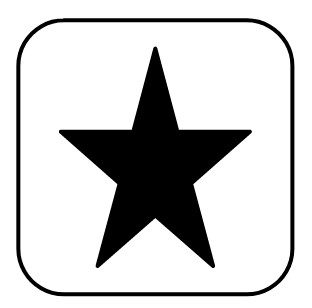

The Star of Yoonir. Symbol of the Universe in Serer religion and cosmogony. It also symbolizes the Serer people of Sine. (O xoor paÿ)
- Reign: c. 1335
- Heir-apparent: Lingeer Ndoung Jein, Lingeer Fatim Malado, Lingeer Ndoye Demba
- Born: Kingdom of Sine
- Spouse: Maad a Sinig Maysa Wali Jaxateh Manneh, king of Sine (Maad a Sinig, 1350 - 1370)
- Issue: Lingeer Ndoung Jein (not the only issue, and not a daughter of Maysa Wali.)
- Lingeer Fatim Beye Joos Fadiou
- House: Joos c. 1335, founder / matriarch
- Religion: Serer religion

Lingeer Fatim Beye Joos Fadiou (commonly Lingeer Fatim Beye) was a 14th-century (c. 1335) Serer princess and queen (Lingeer) from the Kingdom of Sine. She is the matriarch and early ancestor of the Joos Maternal Dynasty of Waalo. She is usually regarded by some sources as the founder of the Joos Maternal Dynasty. The pre-colonial Kingdoms of Sine and Waalo now lies within present-day Senegal. Her surname is Beye (English-Gambia) or Bèye (French-Senegal). Joos Fadiou is her maternal clan. In Serer, "Fa-tim" means "the maternal clan of..."

Lingeer Ndoye Demba, maternal granddaughter of Lingeer Fatim Beye, was given in marriage to the king of Waalo Brak Caaka Mbaar Mbooj), in c. 1367. Lingeer Ndoye Demba went on to establish the Joos Maternal Dynasty in Waalo which lasted from the 14th century to 1855, the year Waalo fell to the French resulting in the disestablishment of the monarchy. From the 14th century to 1855, the Joos Maternal Dynasty provided many kings of Waalo but also contributed to its instability due to dynastic struggles between the competing maternal dynasties of the country (Joos, Tedyek and Loggar).

== Biography ==
Lingeer Fatim Beye was a member of the Serer ethnic group and the matriarch of the Joos Maternal Dynasty of Waalo. The Joos Maternal Dynasty (Serer proper : Joos Fadiou or Dioss Fahou/Fadiou) was a Serer maternal dynasty in the Wolof Kingdom of Waalo.

Fatim Beye was a contemporary of Ndiadiane Ndiaye (founder of the Jolof Empire) and Maad a Sinig Maysa Wali Jaxateh Manneh (var : Manyeasa Wali Dione) who was the first Guelowar to rule in Sine or any of the Serer countries. Some sources note that, she was once married to Maad a Sinig Maysa Wali thereby linking this matriclan to a rather significant part of Serer medieval history, i.e. the constitutional change in Sine which shaped its medieval to 20th century history. The marriage of Lingeer Fatim Beye to one of the most historical personalities of 14th century Senegambian royalty agrees pretty much with the general consensus regarding Serer-Guelowar relations. It was a union based on marriage among the upper echelons Serer and Guelowar society. According to Henry Gravrand, the defeat of the Guelowars by the Ñaancos at the Battle of Troubang in(1335) at Kaabu, spearheaded their migration to Serer territory after the massacre inflicted upon them at Troubang. In reporting this tradition, Gravrand did not notice that this is actually a description of the 1867 (or 1865) Battle of Kansala although the departure of the Guelowar can probably be explained by a war or a conflict of succession. It was the Serer nobility to which Lingeer Fatim Beye's family were a member of, who granted them asylum after their escape from Kaabu, the country of their birth. As an early ancestor of the Joos Maternal Dynasty, with royal ties to two pre-colonial Senegambian kingdoms from the start of their constitutional change, Lingeer Fatim Beye is regarded as one of the most significant female personalities of Serer and Senegambian dynastic history. Her descendants went on to shape Senegambian medieval to 19th century history.

== Joos Maternal Dynasty ==
The Joos Maternal Dynasty originated from the Serer Kingdom of Sine and entered the Wolof Kingdom of Waalo via the maternal granddaughter of Lingeer Fatim Beye (Lingeer Ndoye Demba). The Serer princess - Lingeer Ndoye Demba, originated from Sine where she was married off to the king of Waalo. Although established in Waalo in c. 1367 by Lingeer Ndoye Demba following her marriage to the king of Waalo (Caaka Mbaar Mbooj), this Serer family is linked to old Serer royalty and just one of many of the Serer matriclans. Caaka Mbar was the son of Bakar Mbooj the founder of the Mbooj paternal dynasty of Waalo and an early holder of the royal title Brak. Ndoye Demba's marriage to one of the earliest Braks established the Joos Maternal Dynasty which lasted for nearly 600 years. As of c. 1367, this maternal dynasty provided many Braks of Waalo. Brak Yerim Mbanyik was the first king from this maternal dynasty. He was the son of Lingeer Ndoye Demba and Brak Caaka Mbar. The Braks themselves predated by the Lamanes, ruled over Waalo from the 14th century until the disestablishment of the monarchy in 1855 due to French colonialism.

Although Lingeer Ndoye Demba is generally regarded as the ancestor of the Joos of Waalo, and Lingeer Fatim Beye as an early ancestor and matriarch, some sources suggests that Fatim Beye was the founder of the Joos Dynasty.

That Fatim Bey [Beye] is called the founder of Dioss [Joos] does not conflict with the view that Ndoye Demba is Dioss' ancestor. Fatim/Fatimata Beye was an earlier ancestor.

== See also ==
- Maad Ndaah Njemeh Joof
- Maad Semou Njekeh Joof
- Kingdom of Saloum
- Kingdom of Baol
- Timeline of Serer history
- History of Senegal
- History of the Gambia
- Lingeer Ngoné Dièye

== Bibliography ==
- Sarr, Alioune, "Histoire du Sine-Saloum" (Sénégal). Introduction, bibliographie et notes par Charles Becker. Version légèrement remaniée par rapport à celle qui est parue en 1986–87. p 19
- Monteil, Vincent, " Esquisses sénégalaises", Institut Fondamental d'Afrique Noire, 1966.
- Wade, Amadou, "Chronique du Walo Sénégalais (1186–1855)", B. Cissé trans., V. Monteil, editor, Bulletin de l'IFAN, série B, vol. 26, nos 3/4 (1941, 1964)
- Barry, Boubacar. "Le royaume du Waalo": le Sénégal avant la conquête, Karthala, 1985, ISBN 2865371417 (in French) The "Dyoos" (Retrieved : 8 July 2012)
- Barry, Boubacar, "Le royaume du waalo, le Sénégal avant la conquête", F. Maspéro (1972), p 286
- Bulletin. Serie B: Sciences humaines / Institut fondamental d'Afrique noire, Volume 41. (1979)
- Institut français d'Afrique noire. Bulletin de l'Institut français d'Afrique noire: Sciences humaines, Volume 17. IFAN, (1955)
- Ndiaye Leyti, Oumar, "Le Djoloff et ses Bourba", Les Nouvelles editions africaines (1981). ISBN 2723608174
- Institut fondamental d'Afrique noire, Bulletin de l'Institut fondamental d'Afrique noire: Sciences humaines, Volume 31, IFAN (1969), pp 409–410
- Gastellu, Jean-Marc, "Petit traité de matrilinarité", L'accumulation dans deux sociétés rurales d'Afrique de l'Ouest', Cahiers ORSTOM, série Sciences Humaines (1985)
- Gastellu, Jean-Marc, "Matrilineages, Economic Groups and Differentiation in West Africa" : A Note (O.R.S.TO.M)
- Boulègue, Jean, "Le Grand Jolof", (XVIIIe - XVIe Siècle). (Paris, Edition Façades), Karthala (1987), p 30
- Dyao, Yoro, "Légendes et coutumes sénégalaises", Cahiers de Yoro Dyao: publiés et commentés par Henri Gaden. (E. Leroux, 1912)
- Dupire, Marguerite, "Sagesse sereer: Essais sur la pensée sereer ndut, KARTHALA Editions (1994), ISBN 2865374874 (in French) (Retrieved : 9 July 2012)
- Sheldon, Kathleen E., "Historical dictionary of women in Sub-Saharan Africa", vol. 1, Scarecrow Press (2005), p 148 ISBN 0810853310
- Ogot, Bethwell A., "Africa from the Sixteenth to the Eighteenth Century", (Editors : Bethwell A. Ogot, Unesco. International Scientific Committee for the Drafting of a General History of Africa; contributors : Bethwell A. Ogot, Unesco. International Scientific Committee for the Drafting of a General History of Africa, University of California Press (1992), p 281, ISBN 0435948113 (in English) The "Joos" (Retrieved : 11 July 2012)
