= Mö Mboj Maalik Mboj =

King of Waalo

Mö Mboj Maalik Mboj (var : Mö Mbody Maalik) was the last King of Waalo, a pre-colonial kingdom in what is now northern Senegal. He succeeded to the throne as Brak (king of Waalo) in 1840 and ruled until Waalo was conquered by the French in 1855.

Mboj was a member of the reigning paternal dynasty of Waalo on his father's side. On his maternal line, he was a part of the Loggar matriclan. The Loggars (of Moorish/Maure origin) were one of the three reigning maternal dynasties of Waalo, the other two being Joos (of Serer origin via Lingeer Ndoye Demba, founded in the 14th century) and Tedyek (of Fula origin). During Mbodj's rein, Waalo was relatively weak, caught between the Trarza Emirate and the French based in Saint-Louis. Lingeer Ndaté Yalla Mbodj was a major power in the kingdom as well. In 1855 the French, after years of encroaching on the country, invaded and conquered Waalo, overthrowing the royal family.

== See also ==
- Lingeer Fatim Beye
- Lingeer Ndoye Demba
- Joos Maternal Dynasty
- Waalo
- Maad a Sinig Kumba Ndoffene Famak Joof
- Lat Dior
- History of Senegal
- History of the Gambia

== Bibliography ==
- Barry, Boubacar, "Le royaume du Waalo": le Sénégal avant la conquête, Karthala, 1985, pp 41, 265, 276, ISBN 2865371417 (in French) (Retrieved : 8 July 2012)
- Wade, Amadou, "Chronique du Walo Sénégalais (1186-1855)", B. Cissé trans., V. Monteil, editor, Bulletin de l'IFAN, série B, vol. 26, nos 3/4 (1941, 1964)
- Ajayi, J. F. Ade, "Africa in the Nineteenth Century Until the 1880s", Volume 6, Editors : J. F. Ade Ajayi, Unesco. International Scientific Committee for the Drafting of a General History of Africa, University of California Press ( 1989), p 639, ISBN 0520039173
