= Dagana, Senegal =

Dagana
- Town and commune
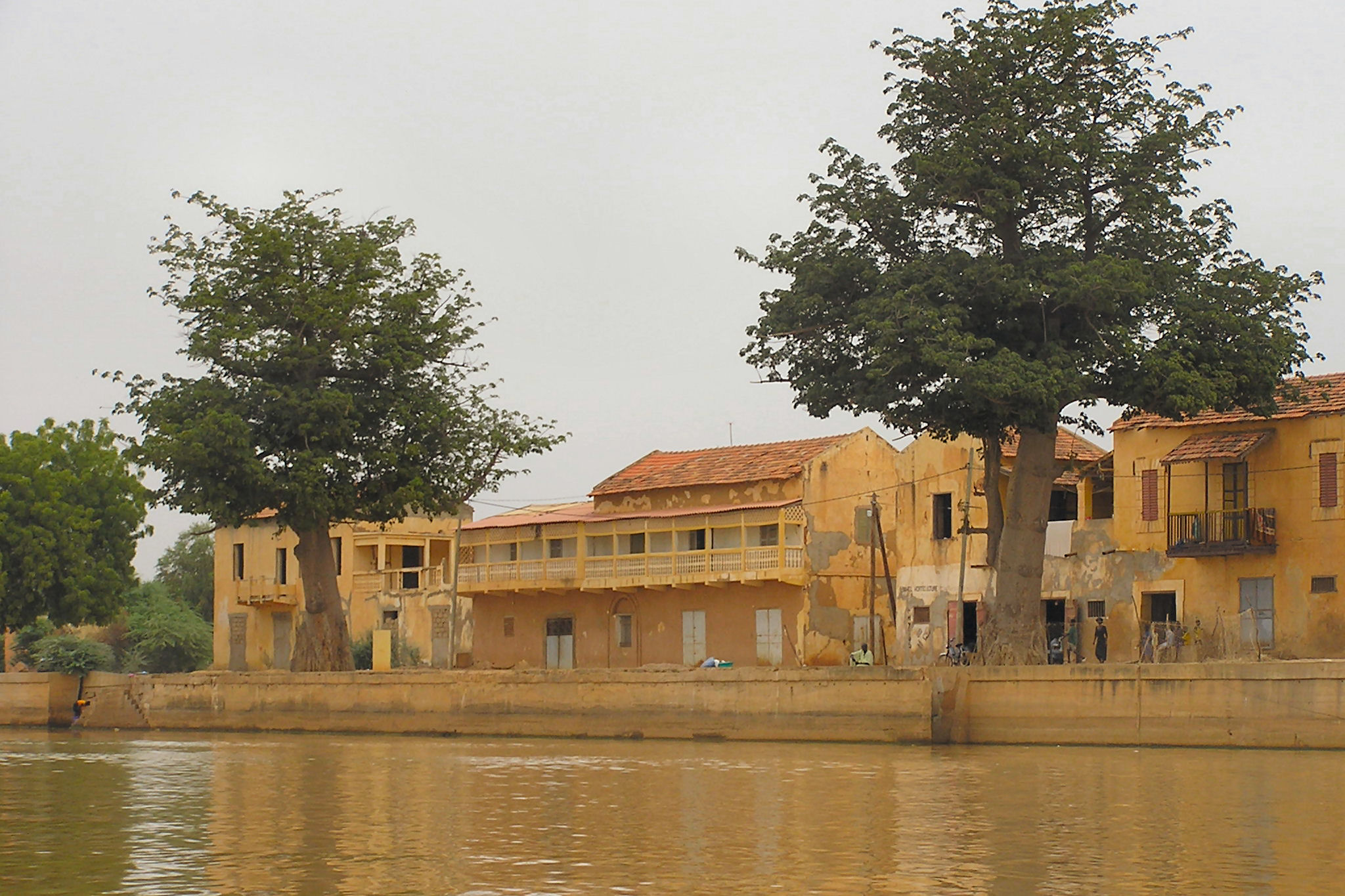
- Colonial-era warehouses on the riverside

- Location within Senegal
- Coordinates: 16°29′N 15°36′W
- Country: Senegal
- Region: Saint-Louis Region

Area
  - commune: 5.526 km^{2} (2.134 sq mi)

Population (2023 census)
  - commune: 26,568
  - Density: 4,808/km^{2} (12,450/sq mi)
- Time zone: UTC+0 (GMT)

Dagana is a town and urban commune situated in the Saint-Louis Region of Senegal and it is the capital of the Dagana Department. Dagana borders Mauritania across the Senegal River.

The different ethnic groups in Dagana include Wolof, Fula (Fula: Fulɓe; French: Peul or Peulh), and Moor.

== History ==
The village was founded in the 14th century. In 1820 the French installed a fort in Dagana, which was expanded over time.

On June 18th 1833, Njembot Mbodj, lingeer of Waalo, married the Trarza Moorish leader Mohamed El Habib in Dagana.

In March 1908 the French fort was unsuccessfully attacked by the marabout Aly Yoro Dia, who was killed in the attempt.

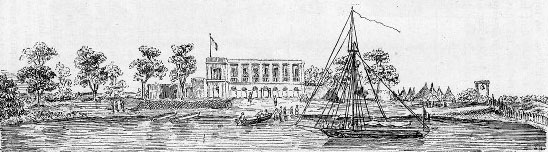
Le poste de Dagana (illustration de Côte occidentale d'Afrique, 1890)

== In popular culture ==
In Season 5, Episode 3 of The Grand Tour, presenters Jeremy Clarkson, Richard Hammond and James May use discarded plastic bottles to float cars across the Senegal River at Dagana, as part of a homage to the Dakar Rally.
