= Mbodj =

Mbodj or Mbodji is a Senegalese surname, named after a clan whose totem is the antelope. Notable people with the name include:

- Aida Mbodj (born 1955), Senegalese politician
- Cheikh Mbodj (born 1987), Senegalese basketball player
- David Mbodj (born 1994), Senegalese footballer
- David Papys M'Bodji (born 1984), Senegalese footballer
- Kara Mbodji (born 1989), Senegalese footballer
- Mamadou Mbodj (born 1993), Senegalese footballer
- Marie Sarr Mbodj (born 1935), Senegalese politician
- Mö Mboj Maalik Mboj (fl. 1840-1855), last King of Waalo (present day Senegambia)
- Njembot Mbodj (1800-1846), last Lingeer of Waalo (present day Senegambia)
- Youssoupha Mbodji (born 2004), Senegalese footballer
