= Ndoye Demba =

Serer royal who was Lingeer regnant of Sine

Lingeer Ndoye Demba
- Queen of Waalo; Princess of Sine
- Reign: c. 1367
- Born: Kingdom of Sine
- Spouse: Brak Caaka Mbaar Mbooj ( King of Waalo)
- Issue: Brak Yerim Mbanyik Ndoye Demba Mbooj (King of Waalo), Sodeh Mbooj
- Lingeer Ndoye Demba Joos Fadiou
- House: Founder of the Joos Maternal Dynasty of Waalo, c. 1367
- Mother: Lingeer Ndoung Jein, Princess of Sine
- Religion: Serer religion

Linguere Ndoye Demba Joos Fadiou, also known as Ndoye Demba in Senegambian dynastic history, was a Serer princess from the Kingdom of Sine (now part of present-day Senegal), from the later half of the 14th century to the 15th century. The royal title – "Lingeer" means Queen or Royal Princess. She was given in marriage to the Brak of Waalo – Caaka Mbaar Mbooj (variation : Brac Thiaka Mbar). The surname Mbooj is the English spelling in the Gambia, variation include Mboge. In French speaking Senegal, it is spelt Mbodj. Differences in spelling is due to the colonial past of the Gambia and Senegal. France colonized Senegal, whilst Britain colonized the Gambia, thus the division of the two countries. Caaka Mbaar was the second king of Waalo from the Mbooj patrilineage, who ruled in the second half of the 14th century, around 1367. Brak was the title of the kings of Waalo. Lingeer Ndoye Demba was the founder of the Serer Joos Maternal Dynasty (variations : Dyoss, Diouss-Fahou, Dious-Fadiou, Dieuss, Dihosou, also "Diouss" – the French spelling in Senegal) of Waalo. In the Wolof Kingdom of Waalo, Lingeer Ndoye Demba is considered the matriarch of the Joos maternal clan. In the Serer Kingdom of Sine, it is her grandmother Lingeer Fatim Beye (variations : Fa-tim Beye or Fatimata Beye) who is considered to be the matriarch of this maternal dynasty. In the Serer language, the word "Fa-tim" means "the maternal clan of ... ". The Serer surname Beye (var : Bèye) is also one of the many Serer maternal clans.

== Marriage and legacy ==
Lingeer Ndoye Demba's marriage to Brak Caaka Mbaar took place in the Kingdom of Sine (the country of her birth). She was given in marriage to the King of Waalo during his visit to Sine. After the marriage, she accompanied her husband to the Kingdom of Waalo where she received great hostility from the two established maternal clans : the Tedyek Maternal Dynasty (of Fula origin) and the Loggar Maternal Dynasty (of Moor origin). The king's mother was a Loggar and his first wife (Lingeer-Awo Yassin Tanor) was a Tedyek. These three maternal dynasties ruled the kingdom of Waalo with the Mbooj paternal family. For nearly six hundred years, these three maternal clans engaged in dynastic wars among themselves. The Battle of Nder (var : Ndeer) which is still celebrated in Waalo, began as a dynastic war between the Joos Maternal Dynasty (maternal descendants of Lingeer Ndoye Demba, of Serer origin) and the Tedyek, where the Joos family massacred several members of the Tedyek maternal clan.

== Descendants of Lingeer Ndoye Demba ==
From the 14th century until the destruction of Waalo in 1855 during the reign of Lingeer Ndateh Yalla Mbooj many kings of Waalo came from the Joos Maternal Dynasty. Some of these include :

- Brak Yerim Mbanyik Ndoye Demba Mbooj, son of Lingeer Ndoye Demba. In a failed attempt to dethrone him, he defeated the Gueye and Diaw family forcing them to seek refuge in Futa Toro.
- Brak Mö Mbôdy Kumba Khedy Mbooj, reigned : reigned : c. 1734 – 1735. At the Battle of Nder (commonly known in Senegambia as "Talaata-i Ndeer" meaning "Tuesday of Ndeer", the day the battle took place), he commanded the Joos army and led a massacre against the Tedyek Dynasty of Waalo. After killing the Brak of Waalo, Yerim Ndateh Bubou, he ursuped his throne.
- Brak Amar Fatim Borso Mbooj, father of Lingeer Ndateh Yalla Mbooj and Lingeer Njombeutt Mbooj, the two sisters who dominated the political scene of Waalo in the 19th century. Reigned : c. 1812 – 1825 according to some. Though it is most probable he reigned up to 1825 or 1826, because he is reported to have died in January 1826. He entered a religious war against the Almamy of Futa Toro (Almamy Biram, var : Almamy Birani), and is reported to have said, "Brak du tuub muk" (meaning "a Brak should never convert" (to Islam), in Wolof).

== Genealogy ==
The following is a brief genealogy of Linguere Ndoye Demba.

Family of Lingeer Ndoye Demba

                                                    Lingeer Fatim Beye
            (From Kingdom of Sine, Princess Royal and Queen of Sine, matriarch of the Joos Maternal Dynasty of Waalo)
                                                              │
                                                        Lingeer Ndoung Jein
                                                         (Princess of Sine)
                                                              │
                                                              │
                                               _______________│
                                               │
                                               │
                                   ┌───────────┴────────────────────────────────────────┐
                               Lingeer Fatim Malado        │                       Nancy Demba
                                 (Princess of Sine)        │                     (Princess of Sine)
                                                           │
                                                           │
                                                           │______________________________________________________________________
                                                                                                                                 │
                                                                                                                                 │
       Lamtoro Abraham Sall (of Futa Toro)                                                                                       │
                 │                                                                                                               │
                 │___________________________________________                                                                    │
                                                            │                                                                    │
                                        ? = Lingeer Fatoumata Sall    =  Mbarick Bo                                              │
                                       (1)                            │    (2)                                                   │
                            ______________│                           │                                                          │
                            │                                     Brak Barka Bo   =  *Lingeer Faaduma Yumeyga                    │
                            │                        (Barka Mbooj, King of Waalo) │______________________________________        │
                            │                                                                                           │        │
               Ndiadiane Ndiaye                  =       Lingeer-Awo Maram Doye Gaye      =    Lingeer Mbat Mboye       │        │
 (King of Jolof, founder of the Jolof Empire)    │      (1)   (daughter of Amar Gaye)     │           (*3)              │        │
                      ___________________________│                                        │                             │        │
                      │                                                                Ware Ndiaye                      │        │
                      │                                                                                                 │        │
                      │                                                      ___________________________________________│        │
                      │                                                      │                                     ______________│
                      │                                                      │                                     │
                      │                                            Brak Caaka Mbaar Mbooj   =          Lingeer Ndoye Demba
          ┌───────────┴────────────────────────────────────────┐       (King of Waalo)      │          (From Kingdom of Sine)
          │               │                 │                  │                            │  (Princess of Sine, Queen of  Waalo)
   Sare Ndiaye          Guet Ndiaye     Ndombuur Ndiaye    Guedo Ndiaye                     │                (2)
 (King of Jolof)                                                            ________________│
                                                                ┌───────────┴────────────────────────────────────────┐
                                                                │                                                    │
                                             Brak Yerim Mbanyik Ndoye Demba Mbooj                              Sodeh Mbooj
                                                        (King of Waalo)                                              │
                                                                                                                     │
                                                        _____________________________________________________________│
                                                        │
                                                        │
                                            ┌───────────┴────────────────────────────────────────┐
                                         Jummoul                  Diouroukh Baka Dequene  =  Aïssa
                                            │                                              │
                ____________________________│                              ________________│
    ┌───────────┴────────────────────────────────────────┐     ┌───────────┴────────────────────────────────────────┐
    │           │         │          │         │         │     │                   │                  │             │
Degene       Mande       Bo Mbody   Fanta      Degene    Ko    Khadj Yalladj  Jaw Njuck         Mbouneh Njuck    Fary Njuck
Borom        Borom                  Mbooj      Mbooj    Mbooj  Ndiouk              │
                                                                                   │
                                                                             Fa Mbooj Njaak

== See also ==
- History of Senegal
- History of the Gambia
- Kingdom of Sine
- Waalo
- Serer people
- Lingeer Ngoné Dièye

== Bibliography ==
- Monteil, Vincent, " Esquisses sénégalaises", Institut Fondamental d'Afrique Noire, 1966.
- Barry, Boubacar, "Le royaume du waalo, le Sénégal avant la conquête", F. Maspéro (1972)
- Zaghi, Carlo, "L'Africa nella coscienza europea e l'imperialismo italiano", Guida (1973), p 288
- Bulletin. Serie B: Sciences humaines / Institut fondamental d'Afrique noire, Volume 41. (1979)
- Institut français d'Afrique noire. Bulletin de l'Institut français d'Afrique noire: Sciences humaines, Volume 17. IFAN, (1955)
