= Joos Maternal dynasty =

Serer maternal dynasty from the Serer pre-colonial Kingdom of Sine in the 14th century

Joos Maternal Dynasty
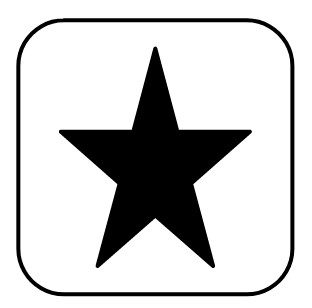
- The Star of Yoonir. Symbol of the Universe in Serer religion and cosmogony. It also symbolizes the Serer people of Sine. (O xoor paÿ).
- Parent house: Descendance of the Serer princess Lingeer Fatim Beye of Sine.
- Country: Kingdom of Sine, part of present-day Senegal
- Founded: c. 1367 (in Waalo) but much old in Serer country (Lamanic-Era).
- Founder: Lingeer Fatim Beye of Sine, established in Waalo by Lingeer Ndoye Demba of Sine.
- Final ruler: Brak Kharfi Khari Daaro (reigned 1837–1840)
- Titles: Brak and Lingeer
- Dissolution: 1855 – dissolution of Waalo after Brak Mö Mboj Maalik Mboj (last Brak), and the defeath of Lingeer Ndateh Yalla Mbooj and her husband Morosso Tasse Jobe by the French.

The Joos Maternal Dynasty (Serer: Joos Fadiou/Fadioudj, other variations: Dioss Fahou/Fadiou, Dyoss, Dieuss, Dihosou, Diouss, Dyoos or Djeus) was a Serer maternal dynasty which originated from the Serer pre-colonial Kingdom of Sine in the 14th century and spread to the Wolof Kingdom of Waalo. The matriarch or founder of this maternal dynasty was Lingeer Fatim Beye, a princess and queen originally from the Kingdom of Sine. In Waalo, it was founded by the princess Lingeer Ndoye Demba of Sine. Lingeer Ndoye Demba was the maternal granddaughter of Lingeer Fatim Beye. They both came from the Serer ethnic group. The pre-colonial Kingdoms of Sine and Waalo now forming a part of modern-day Senegal maintained good relations with other pre-colonial kingdoms.

From c. 1367, this maternal dynasty provided many kings of Waalo who rule by the royal title "Brak". The Braks were the successors of the Lamanes in Waalo, and ruled the country from the 14th century to 1855, the year Waalo fell to the French which resulted to the abolition of the monarchy.

== Origins ==
The origins of the Joos as a matriclan is uncertain. What is known is that, it is just one of the many Serer matriclans which were in existence at the time of the Lamanes. The Lamanes were the old Serer kings. The exact period within the Serer calendar that this matriclan first acquired notoriety in Serer country is a matter of conjecture. Other than being in existence at the time of the Lamanes little is known about which part of the Lamanic period it first gained prominence. According to some sources, it was prominent by the first half of the 14th century. This corresponds to the collapse of the Lamanic Era (see also Lamane Jegan Joof, the Joof family and Guelowar). The name of their clan (Joos Fadiou) means the Joos of Fadiou (Fadiouth).

== History ==
The Joos Maternal Dynasty was one of the Serer and Senegalese dysnasties in pre-colonial Senegal. The princess Lingeer Ndoye Demba (founder of this dynasty in Waalo) descended from the maternal line of Lingeer Fatim Beye, the matriarch of this dynasty, both originally from the Kingdom of Sine and members of the Serer ethnic group. Lingeer Fatim Beye is the maternal grandmother of Ndoye Demba and ancestor of all the Joos that came after her. In some sources, she is cited as the founder of the Joos Dynasty.

That Fatim Bey [Beye] is called the founder of Dioss [Joos] does not conflict with the view that Ndoye Demba is Dioss' ancestor. Fatim/Fatimata Beye was an earlier ancestor.

Lingeer Fatim Beye who was a contemporary of Ndiadiane Ndiaye the possibly mythical founder of the Jolof Empire, is also reported to have been married to Maad a Sinig Maysa Wali Jaxateh Manneh (var: Manyeasa Wali Dione) at one point. Maysa Wali was the first member of the Guelowar Dynasty to rule in Sine or any of the Serer kingdoms after a severe defeat inflicted on his family (the Guelowars) by the Ñaancos. The Ñaancos were for several centuries until 1865 (the Battle of Kansala) the reigning and powerful maternal dynasty of Kaabu (in present-day Guinea-Bissau). They defeated the Guelowars at the Battle of Troubang, an alleged dynastic war between the royal houses of Guelowar and Ñaancos. In fact there was no "Battle of Troubang". In reporting this tradition, Henry Gravrand did not notice that this is actually a description of the 1867 (or 1865) Battle of Kansala although the departure of the Guelowar can probably be explained by a war or a conflict of succession. Having escaped Kaabu, the country of their birth, they were granted asylum by the Serer nobility to which Lingeer Fatim Beye's family were a member of. The marriages between the upper echelons of Serer and Guelowar society sealed the union between Serer-Guelowar. In 1350, Maysa Wali was nominated and elected Maad a Sinig (king of Sine) by the people of Sine, having served as legal advisor to the nobles that granted him and his family asylum. He ruled from 1350 to 1370.

The penetration of the Joos matriclan of Sine in the Wolof Kingdom of Waalo came via Lingeer Ndoye Demba. The Kingdom of Waalo was ruled by the Mbooj paternal family who went by the royal title Brak (title for the kings of Waalo). As well as this patrilineal mode of succession, a Brak had to belong to one of the main three royal matriclans before being eligible to succeed to the throne. These three maternal clans were the reigning maternal dynasties of Waalo and included: the Joos Maternal Dynasty (of Serer origin), Tedyek (of Fula origin although other sources suggests a Mende origin) and Loggar (of Moor origin). In Wolof, matriclans are called meen or mène, in Serer, they are called tim. Succession was patrilineal (kurcala in Serer, meaning paternal inheritance or simanGol meaning paternal lineage) as well as matrilineal (ƭeen yaay or den yaay in Serer). Lingeer Ndoye Demba (princess of Sine) was given in marriage to the king of Waalo (Brak Caaka Mbooj) when he visited the Sine. The royal wedding took place in Sine, and after the marriage, the princess accompanied her husband to his country (Waalo). The Joos Maternal Dynasty although long established in Sine, and just one of the many Serer matriclans, it was the newest addition to the medieval maternal dynasties of Waalo. The other maternal dynasties of Waalo (Tedyek and Loggar) were already established. The mother of Brak Caaka Mbodj was a Loggar and his first wife (Lingeer Isa Tanor) a Tedyek. Isa Tanor descended from the maternal line of Guet May Beut (the matriarch of the Tedyeks). For the next six hundred years since its foundation to the dissolution of Waalo in 1855, royal princes from these three maternal dynasties engaged in dynastic civil wars in order to secure their succession to the throne. In the 18th century, the prince Mö Mbôdy Kumba Khedy Mbooj (later – Brak Mö Mbôdy Kumba Khedy Mbooj, reigned c. 1734 – 1735, according to Amadou Wade), who was then the head of the Joos Dynasty galvanised the support of his maternal clan and led a massacre of the other maternal dynasties of Waalo, particularly the Tedyeks, the biggest rivals to the Joos. Many prominent members of the Tedyek clan were killed by the Joos including the reigning king at the time Brak Yerim Ndateh Boubou (Tedyek), as well as his family. This historical event precipitated the Battle of Nder more commonly referred to as Talaata-i-Ndeer . The phrase "Talaata-i-Ndeer" (or Talaata i Ndeer / Nder) means "Tuesday of Ndeer", signifying the fact the event took place on a Tuesday at the then capital of Waalo (Ndeer or Nder).

Other sources seems to indicate that, either the Joos family did not cause the Battle of Nder (Talaata Ñ'Deer among some) or there were two historical battles of Nder (one during the reigns of Brak Yerim Ndateh Boubou and Brak Mö Mbôdy Kumba Khedy or during the reign of Brak Njaak Kumba Xuri Yaay). According to some, the battle was caused by the Fulani Almamy of Futa Toro who led a surprised attack at Nder after Brak Njaak Kumba Xuri Yaay (the king of Waalo) had left his capital (Nder) on a visit to Ndar (St. Louis, in Senegal). However, the general consensus is that, there was only one historical "Talaata-i-Ndeer" ("The Battle of Nder") – the battle which took place between the Joos and Tedyek family. This confusion is due to a chronological error in Amadou Wade's Chronique du Walo where the year of reign for the kings of Waalo (Brak) were listed in error. Another reason for this confusion is that, the original battle instigated by the Joos, created a civil war which lasted for several years (20 years according to some or 29 years) That civil war may have continued right up to the reign of Brak Njaak Kumba Xuri Yaay who reigned long after Brak Yerim Ndateh Boubou and Brak Mö Mbôdy Kumba Khedy. The surprise attack launched in Waalo against Brak Njaak Kumba Xuri Yaay's capital (Nder) by the Almamy of Futa, was just one of many of his jihadic expeditions especially in Jolof and Cayor. He was finally defeated by the Damel of Cayor (Amari Ngoneh Ndela or Amari Ngoné Ndella, reigned 1790–1809).

Following the "Joos Wars" led by their leader Mö Mbôdy Kumba Khedy, the throne of Waalo was secured by the Joos family who spend a long time waging wars to retain it. However, long after the death of Brak Mö Mbôdy Kumba Khedy, the throne was peacefully handed over to the rightfully elected king (a Tedyek) by the Council of Electors (the Sek ak Baor or Seb ak Baor). Although Brak Mö Mboj Maalik Mboj (a Loggar) was the last Brak of Waalo just before the collapsed of the monarchy in 1855 under Lingeer Ndateh Yalla Mbooj (a Tedyek) and her husband Morosso Tasse Jobe (prince of Cayor), the political scene of Waalo was dominated by the Joos and Tedyek Dynasty for nearly 600 years. The greatest threat to the Joos were the Tedyeks, who provided more kings of Waalo. The Loggars were prominent during early part of the Mbooj paternal dynasty, but lost their dominance later on. In the 18th century, they tried to allied themselves with the Joos in order to gain power and succeed to the throne. The Joos – Loggar alliances dominated the political scene of Waalo in this period. It also exacerbated the political situation of the country and the civil war. In this period where every maternal family tried to advance their own cause, alliances were formed and broken (see list of kings below, "Brak Yerim Kode Fara Mbune").

The powers of these maternal dynasties were very real. They were able to raise an army as in the Battle of Nder; had the financial capacity and backing to ensure the accession of their clan members. The enthroned Lingeer - Njombot Mbooj, the full blood sister of Ndateh Yalla and daughter of Brak Amar Fatim Borso Mbooj (a Joos), is reported to have bribed a prominent member of the Council of Electors by the name of Jawdin Sharlu (var. Dyawdin Sharlu) with a total sum of 1500 French Francs and gold just to secure the election of her preferred candidate. This bribery, is reported to have been carried out in the three days she had her randevu with the Council member (500 French Francs a day including gold). Njombot Mbooj (born 1800, died September 1846) and her younger sister (Ndateh Yalla) were two of the most powerful women in Senegalese history in the first half of the 19th century. They were preceded by Lingeer Yassin (early 19th century) and Lingeer Mbarika Mbooj (17th century), two of the most powerful and influential women of Senegalese dynastic history. Both were from the Joos matriclan. Lingeer Mbarika Mbooj (var. Mborika or Mbarika Mbodje) was the mother of Brak Yerim Kode Ngone, the head of the 17 princes of Joos. Although the Jolof Empire collapsed in 1549 following the Battle of Danki, some kings of Jolof (Bourba) tried to rejuvenate the old Empire. As a council member of her son's court, Brak Yerim Kode Ngone spent many years of his reign trying to repulse the Jolof advance and liberate Waalo from the yoke of Jolof. He is reported to have died fighting his last war with Jolof. He is one of the most revered kings of Waalo for his part in achieving Waalo's independence, free from Jolof control. Waalo was totally liberated from the influence of Jolof few years after his death.

== List of kings ==
The following is a list of some of the Braks of Waalo who partains to the Joos Maternal Dynasty. Their surname is Mbooj :

- Brak Yerim Mbanyik Ndoye Demba Mbooj (var. Yérim Mbanyik Ndoy Demba), most probably reigned from c. 1403 to 1410 (or 1445–1457 according to some). Son of Lingeer Ndoye Demba and Brak Caaka Mbaar. When the Jaw and Gaye family tried to launch a war against him to have him dethroned, he defeated them with his army and forced them to seek refuge in Tekrur now Futa Toro in Senegal.
- Brak Kiou Kouli (var. Kioukouli)
- Brak Mayor Aissa
- Brak Fara Koy Jon (var. Fara Koy Dyon or Fara Kodiègue), reigned c. 1676 – 1679
- Brak Fara Koy Jobe (var. Fara Koy Dyôp or Fara Kouri Kodiop)
- Brak Fara Ko Ndaama (var. Fara Ko Ndama), reigned c. 1670 – 1683
- Brak Naatago Khari Daaro (var. Natagou Khary Daro)
- Brak Yerim Kode Ngone Mbooj (var. Yerim Kode N'Dyureane), reigned c. 1673 – 1676?. Reported to have died in battle fighting Jolof. He was the head of the 17 princes of Joos and one of the most revered Braks of Waalo.
- Brak Fara Kumba, reigned c. 1665 – 1673 (first), c. 1664 – 1676 (second). According to some, he died in 1676 during the Marabout wars launched against him (the jihads of Senegambia launched by the Muslims).
- Brak Mö Mbôdy Kumba Khedy Mbooj, reigned c. 1734 – 1735. One of the best known Braks of Waalo, although for the wrong reasons. Instigated and led the Joos at the Battle of Nder. The Joos were victorious. After the killing of the reigning Brak – Yerim Ndateh Boubou (Tedyek), Brak Mö Mbôdy Kumba Khedy entered the residence of his own paternal aunt – Lingeer Condama (var. Kô Ndama, a Tedyek) and assassinated her. Lingeer Condama was accused of favouring her own maternal nephew (Brak Yerim Ndateh Bubou) against her paternal nephew (Brak Mö Mbôdy Kumba Khedy), and engaging in the political affairs of Waalo which were detrimental to the Joos cause. According to Amadou Wade, he was assassinated on the day of his coronation. It is advanced that, a professional assassine from Trazar, by the name of Solomono was hired to carry out the mission.
- Brak Yerim Kode Fara Mbune Mbooj (var. Yérim Kodé Mbunè or Yérim Kodé Fara Mbouma), He came to power having allied himself with his matriclan (the Joos) and the Loggars, especially Ndyak Xuri (var. Njaak Xuri). His predecessor Yerim Mbanyik Anta (Tedyek) was killed along with several Tedyek princes. His Loggar ally (Ndyak Xuri) was hoping to succeed to the throne after the demise of the Tedyek, however, he didn't succeed to the throne. After their victory, Yerim Kode Fara Mbune succeeded to the throne and his Loggar ally was exiled to Jolof. About two years after his reign (according to some), Ndyak Xuri, leading the Loggar clan, formed an alliance with the Lamtoro of Futa Toro and the Emir of Trazar in order to dethrone Yerim Kode Fara Mbune. At the Battle of Mbuden, Yerim Kode Fara was killed along with many members of the Joos family.
- Brak Maboje Kumba (var. Mabodje Coumba) reigned 6 November 1775 – 5 May 1776. His reigne coincided with the battles involving the Joos and Loggar, the intervention of governor O'Hara in Waalo's civil war and Moorish interference in the country's politics.
- Brak Saayodo Yaasin Mbôdy Mbooj (var. Saayodo Yassin Modi or Sayodo Yacine Mbodje), reigned c. 1801 – 1806 or 1805–1810
- Brak Amar Fatim Borso Mbooj (var. Amar Faatim Borsô or Amar Faty Mborso), reigned 1812–1823, (probably reigned up to 1825 or 1826, because he is reported to have died in January 1826). Known for his anti-Islamic views. He is cited to have said a Brak should never convert to Islam. That was after the Almamy of Futa Toro (Almamy Biran) launched his jihad in his country among other Senegambian states such as Jolof and Cayor, and converted the king of Jolof as well as Brak Fara Penda Tigereleh (a Tedyek and predecessor of Brak Amar Fatim Borso). The Joos, led by Amar Fatim and other clan members, regarded Fara Penda as too weak for converting through fear, rather than standing up to the Almany. Although Fara Penda stated his conversion was sincere, he was not believed. Amar Fatim is also the father of Lingeer Ndateh Yalla and Njombout (both Tedyeks, their mother Lingeer Awo Fatim Yamar Khuri Yaye Mbooj).
- Kharfi Khari Daaro (var. Khirfi Khary Daro), reigned 1837–1840

== List of queens ==
This list gives some of the prominent queens or queen mothers who belong to this maternal dynasty. They go by the royal title Lingeer (var. linger) :

- Lingeer Fatim Beye – matriarch of the Joos c. 1335
- Lingeer Ndoye Demba, founder of the Joos dynasty in Waalo, c. 1367
- Lingeer Mbarika Mbooj (var. Mborika or Mbarika Mbodje) – mother of Brak Yerim Kode Ngone, the head of the 17 princes of Joos.
- Lingeer Yassin (var. Yacine Mboj) – mother of Brak Saayodo Yassin Modi Mbooj and wife of prince Jabou Jouba Ali Mbooj (var. Diabou Douba Ali)

== See also ==
- The Royal House of Boureh Gnilane Joof
- The Royal House of Jogo Siga Joof
- The Royal House of Semou Njekeh Joof

== Bibliography ==
- Sarr, Alioune, "Histoire du Sine-Saloum" (Sénégal). Introduction, bibliographie et notes par Charles Becker. Version légèrement remaniée par rapport à celle qui est parue en 1986–87. p 19
- Becker, Charles, "Vestiges historiques, trémoins matériels du passé clans les pays sereer", Dakar (1993), CNRS – ORS TO M. (in French) (Retrieved 9 July 2012)
- Gravrand, Henry. "La civilisation sereer", vol. I, Cosaan: les origines. Nouvelles éditions africaines, Dakar, 1983
- Monteil, Vincent, " Esquisses sénégalaises", Institut Fondamental d'Afrique Noire, 1966.
- Wade, Amadou, "Chronique du Walo Sénégalais (1186–1855)", B. Cissé trans., V. Monteil, editor, Bulletin de l'IFAN, série B, vol. 26, nos 3/4 (1941, 1964)
- Barry, Boubacar. "Le royaume du Waalo": le Sénégal avant la conquête, Karthala, 1985, ISBN 2865371417 (in French) The "Dyoos" (Retrieved 8 July 2012)
- Barry, Boubacar, "Le royaume du waalo, le Sénégal avant la conquête", F. Maspéro (1972), pp 261 & 286
- Abbey, M.T. Rosalie Akouele. "Customary Law and Slavery in Africa", Trafford Publishing, (2011), ISBN 978-1-4269-7117-4
- Bulletin. Serie B: Sciences humaines / Institut fondamental d'Afrique noire, Volume 41. (1979)
- Institut français d'Afrique noire. Bulletin de l'Institut français d'Afrique noire: Sciences humaines, Volume 17. IFAN, (1955)
- Ndiaye Leyti, Oumar, "Le Djoloff et ses Bourba", Les Nouvelles editions africaines (1981). ISBN 2723608174
- Institut fondamental d'Afrique noire, Bulletin de l'Institut fondamental d'Afrique noire: Sciences humaines, Volume 31, IFAN (1969), pp 409–410
- Ogot, Bethwell A., "Africa from the Sixteenth to the Eighteenth Century", (Editors: Bethwell A. Ogot, Unesco. International Scientific Committee for the Drafting of a General History of Africa; contributors: Bethwell A. Ogot, Unesco. International Scientific Committee for the Drafting of a General History of Africa, University of California Press (1992), p 281, ISBN 0435948113 The "Joos" (Retrieved 11 July 2012)
- Gastellu, Jean-Marc, "Petit traité de matrilinarité", L'accumulation dans deux sociétés rurales d'Afrique de l'Ouest', Cahiers ORSTOM, série Sciences Humaines (1985)
- Gastellu, Jean-Marc, "Matrilineages, Economic Groups and Differentiation in West Africa": A Note (O.R.S.TO.M)
- Sonko-Godwin, Patience, "Ethnic groups of the Senegambia: a brief history", Sunrise Publishers (1988), p. 29–31 ISBN 9983860007
- Kalis, Simone, "Médecine traditionnelle religion et divination chez les Seereer Sine du Senegal", La connaissance de la nuit, L'Harmattan (1997), p 299, ISBN 2-7384-5196-9
- Boulègue, Jean, "Le Grand Jolof", (XVIII^{e} – XVI^{e} siècle). (Paris, Edition Façades), Karthala (1987), p 30
- Dyao, Yoro, "Légendes et coutumes sénégalaises", Cahiers de Yoro Dyao: publiés et commentés par Henri Gaden. (E. Leroux, 1912)
- Dupire, Marguerite, "Sagesse sereer: Essais sur la pensée sereer ndut, KARTHALA Editions (1994), ISBN 2865374874 (in French) (Retrieved 9 July 2012)
- Sheldon, Kathleen E., "Historical dictionary of women in Sub-Saharan Africa", vol. 1, Scarecrow Press (2005), p 148 ISBN 0810853310
- « Amadou Wade, "Chronique", commenté par Vincent Monteil, 1966 » [in] Sall, Ibrahima Abou, "Mauritanie du Sud: conquêtes et administration coloniales françaises, 1890–1945", KARTHALA Editions (2007), p 49, note 20. ISBN 2845868650 (in French)"Logar", "Joos" and "Teejëk"
- Université de Dakar. Département de langues et civilisations germaniques, "Études germano-africaines: revue annuelle du Département de langues et civilisations germaniques de la Faculté des lettres et sciences humaines de l'Université de Dakar (Sénégal)., Issue 6", Le Département (1988), p 51
- Fage, J. D.; Oliver, Roland; "The Cambridge History of Africa." Volume 3. Cambridge University Press, 1975, p. 486, ISBN 0521209811 & ISBN 9780521209816
- Zaghi, Carlo, "L'Africa nella coscienza europea e l'imperialismo italiano", Guida (1973), p 288
