= BIFAN =

BIFAN may refer to:

- Bucheon International Fantastic Film Festival, genre film festival in South Korea
- Bulletin de l'Institut Fondamental d'Afrique Noire
