= Franco-Trarzan War of 1825 =

Conflict between France and the Emirate of Trarza

Date	1825
Location	Waalo, West Africa
Result	French victory

Belligerents
Kingdom of France	Emirate of Trarza

Commanders and leaders
Charles X	Muhammad al-Habib

The Franco-Trarzan War of 1825 was a conflict between the forces of the new emir of Trarza, Muhammad al-Habib, and France, ruled at the time by Charles X and the ultra comte de Villèle. In 1825, Muhammad attempted to establish control over the French-protected Waalo Kingdom, then located south of the Senegal River, by marrying Njembot Mbodj, the heiress to the kingdom. The French responded by sending a large expeditionary force that crushed Muhammad's army. The war incited the French to expand to the north of the Senegal River.

== See also ==
- France in the long nineteenth century
- French colonial empire
- List of French possessions and colonies
