= Lingeer =

Title given to the mother or sister of a king

Serer royal and religious titles
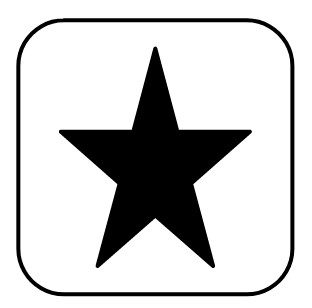
- Royal titles
- Lamane (also religious)
- Maad
- Maad a Sinig
- Maad Saloum
- Teigne
- Lingeer
- Line of succession
- Buumi
- Thilas
- Loul Religious titles
- Saltigue

Lingeer (also: Linger or Linguère) was the title given to the mother or sister of a king in the Serer kingdoms of Sine, Saloum, and previously the Kingdom of Baol; and the Wolof kingdoms of Cayor, Jolof, Baol and Waalo in pre-colonial Senegal. The word "Lingeer" means "queen" or "princess" in Serer and Wolof languages. The Lingeer was considered the “great princess of royal courts.” These kingdoms utilized a bilineal system, as a candidate for kingship could not succeed to the throne if he was not a member of the reigning materlineage, and thus, the Lingeer's maternal lineage was highly significant. Similarly, a candidate could not succeed to the throne as king if he was not a member of the noble reigning patriclans. That was particularly so among the Serer who retained much of their old culture, customs and traditional religion where women played a significant role compared to the Wolof who adopted Islam. Various Lingeers have been noted for their resistance efforts to colonial conquest.

== Classification ==
Although the royal title Lingeer was generally given to the mother or sister of the king, and sometimes the first wife of the king (the "Lingeer-Awo"), the title could also mean a royal princess. In this case, it meant a woman who could trace royal descent from both her paternal and maternal line. In Wolof and Serer tradition, a woman who could trace royal descent on both her paternal and maternal lines automatically became a Lingeer. The male equivalent was Garmi (a man who could trace royal descent on both his paternal and maternal lines). It is from these Lingeers (a woman of pure royal blood) that a king would seek to marry. The king himself was a member of the Garmi class.

== Characteristics and powers ==
Historians are careful not to understate her influence in the pre-colonial period; the Lingeer is said to both make and unmake kings. In the Wolof state, the Lingeer's political significance traditionally included: control of some of the king's land, which they would administer by using captives; provision of food and maintenance for their retainers; and integration into the clan system. Members of the community needed to charm and persuade a Lingeer if they held hopes of acquiring a political career.

In the Serer Kingdoms of Sine and Saloum, the Lingeer held significant power and was crowned Lingeer by the Maad a Sinig and Maad Saloum (King of Sine and Saloum, respectively) after his own coronation ceremony. In the economic realm, like her Wolof counterpart, the Lingeer of Serer societies controlled several villages, the contributions of which she was free to utilize. The inhabitants of such villages would traditionally cultivate a field of grain for their Lingeer.

Many noble families sent forth their daughters to be followers of the Lingeer; however, captives often filled this role as well.

The Lingeer was accompanied by a female géwél, a professional singer or musician, regionally known as a griot. The géwél sang listeners to sleep at night and awakened them in the morning. The types of songs sung to honor a Lingeer's sovereignty include: taggate, màdd, woy u lingeer, and buur.

The power position that the Lingeer occupied was a bi- and sometimes tri-cameral one: her leadership activities were carried out at the highest tier, as a co-monarch. In the case of a conflict between a Lingeer and the king, a Lingeer would sometimes create new political alliances.

Towards the end of the seventeenth century, a relationship was established throughout many Wolof lands between the Lingeers and the Idaw al-Hajj, a vast grouping of Saharan immigrants that established a commercial network linking Senegambia with North Africa and the western Sahara. In these instances, the Idaw al-Hajj served as the queen's religious advisors.

== History ==
While many of the Lingeer are no longer known of, some of these women made their way into the historical record for their leadership and, in later cases, resistance to colonial incursions.

One of the earliest known Lingeers is Lingeer Fatim Beye (c. 1335), the matriarch of the Joos Maternal Dynasty. She was a Serer Princess and Queen of Sine. She was once married to King Maad a Sinig Maysa Wali. She is an early ancestor of all the Joos who went on to rule Waalo, such as her granddaughter Lingeer Ndoye Demba (c. 1367). Lingeer Ndoye Demba, also of Serer origin, established the Joos Maternal Dynasty in the Wolof kingdom of Waalo as the region's queen and Princess of Sine. Lingeer Fatoumata Sall was the mother of the possibly mythical monarch Ndiadiane Ndiaye, who was emperor of the Jolof in the 1360s.

The Lingeer's role sometimes extended to overthrowing the current king. In 1673, Ndyai Sal or Sar, a marabout of likely Tukuloor descent, was offered marriage and military alliance from a Lingeer who had been recently deposed by a new king. Together, they defeated and killed the king. They then proceeded to select a new candidate, royal by birth, but also potentially more malleable to their control.

Historians have cited instances in which the Lingeer's role extended into negotiating the relationship between the Wolof and Serer kingdoms. One such example involves the Lingeer Djembet (many variations: Jembet, Njembot Mbodj). In 1833, Djembet married the king of Trarza (in Mauritania), Mohamed El-Habib. This political marriage provided the couple with control over the Waalo and the Trarza. The alliance was prompted not by the threat of Moorish expansion – a position encouraged by the opposition – but rather to construct a more resistant bloc against colonial invasion. The marriage faced a not insignificant amount of opposition within Waalo, yet was carried through by Djembet to halt French political expansion in the region. In 1841, she chose the king to succeed Fara Penda Adam Sal upon his death.

Ndaté Yalla Mbodj was the sister of Djembet and succeeded her in 1846. Her political action was similarly momentous and controversial; she is notable for her refusal of a French alliance. She prevented her son from contesting the accession of Djembet's son to the throne. One scholar attributes this choice to N’Daate Yaala's desire not to “break up the power of the unified kingdom.”

== Literary and filmic representations ==
The character of the Lingeer has been featured in Senegambian literature. Ginette Ba-Curry writes of the Lingeer presence in Cheikh Hamidou Kane's novel Ambiguous Adventure: “The Most Royal Lady is a female figure belonging to pre-Islamic society, recalling the 'Linguere' ... She is the reflection of the historical heroines of the Senegalese past such as the heiress of the Waalo throne, Lingeer Jombot who was in charge of the political affairs of the Waalo region and was succeeded by her sister Nade Yalla, wife of Maroso, the Prince of Kajoor”.

In artistic Serer expression, especially in oral poetry and the culture of the traditional griotte, performers depict the Lingeer character as playing an important role in their society's functioning.

Films such as Abderrahmane Sissako’s Timbuktu (2014) feature a Lingeer character. Djibril Diop Mambety's Hyènes (1992) features the character Linguere Ramatou as its protagonist. Her first name is an alternate spelling of Lingeer and she has in fact been described as a royal of sorts: film scholars write that she is “an outcast-cum-queen who sits contemplating the horizon”.

== Burial ground ==
All crowned Serer lingeers of Sine are buried at Tioupane, Diakhao (in modern-day Senegal). The historic village of Tioupane was where the crowned lingeer, usually the Maad a Sinig's mother, took residence. The Serer kings are buried elsewhere in Sine. Only the lingeers are buried in Tioupane. Non-crowned lingeers are also buried in Tioupane, but in a different section within the graveyard, away from the crowned lingeers. Like the graves of the Serer kings, the graves of the lingeers are also marked, and there are historian on site who narrates their genealogy and history. Like the other Serer historic and sacred grounds, the burial site of Tioupane has been added to the list of sites of historic importance by the Senegalese Ministry of Culture (2006 decree).

== List of Lingeers ==
- Lingeer Fatoumata Sall
- Lingeer Fatim Beye (c. 1335)
- Lingeer Ndoye Demba (c. 1367) (granddaughter of Fatim Beye)
- Yacine Boubou, Lingeer of Cayor
- Maram N'Galgou, Lingeer of Cayor
- Lingeer Ngoné Dièye, 17th century Queen and Queen Mother of Cayor and Baol, and mother of Damel Lat Sukabe Fall
- Lingeer Ngooné Lattir
- Lingeer Dyambourguel
- Lingeer Tegue Rella Khouriyaye – the sister and predecessor of Fatim Yamar
- Lingeer Fatim Yamar, mother of Njembot Mbodj and Ndaté Yalla Mbodj
- Lingeer Djembet or Njembot Mbodj (active in 1830s; died September 1846).
- Lingeer Ndaté Yalla Mbodj, succeeded her sister in 1846.
- Lingeer Debbo of Cayor
- Lingeer Selbe Diouf or Lingeer Selbeh Ndoffene Joof (French: Selbé Diouf), daughter of King of Sine—Maad a Sinig Kumba Ndoffene Famak Joof. She was kidnapped by the Senegambian Muslim forces during the surprise attack of Mbin o Ngor (or Keur Ngor). That surprise attack against the Serer people of Sine precipitated the Battle of Fandane-Thiouthioune in 1867 where the forces of Kumba Ndoffene defeated the Muslim Marabouts, killing their leader Maba Diakhou Bâ. Following the kidnappng of the Serer Princes, she was forcefully married off to Abdoulaye Ouli Bâ—one of Maba's brothers without her father's permission. After Kumba Ndoffene's victory at Fandane-Thiouthioune, the King gave the order to have Abdoulaye Ouli Bâ castrated for his audacity in entering his daughter into a forced marriage.

== See also ==
- Maad a Sinig
- Maad Saloum
- Damel
- Teigne (title)
- Brak (African kings)
- Buumi
- Thilas
- Loul

== Bibliography ==
- Ba-Curry, Ginette (July 2008). "African Women, Tradition and Change in Cheikh Hamidou Kane's Ambiguous Adventure and Mariama Bâ's So Long a Letter". Journal of Pan African Studies, July 2008, vol 2, no.5.
- Sarr, Alioune, "Histoire du Sine-Saloum" (Sénégal), (Introduction, bibliographie et notes par Charles Becker), Version légèrement remaniée par rapport à celle qui est parue en 1986–87.
- Sheldon, Kathleen E., "Historical dictionary of women in Sub-Saharan Africa", vol. 1, Scarecrow Press, 2005, p 148 ISBN 0-8108-5331-0
- Klein, Martin A. "Islam and Imperialism in Senegal Sine-Saloum, 1847–1914." Edinburgh University Press (1968) pp 11–15 & 262, ISBN 0-85224-029-5
- Glinga, Werner, Diop, Papa Samba, "Sénégal-Forum. IKO-Verlag für Interkulturelle Kommunikation, 1996. p 110, ISBN 3-88939-431-0
- Anyidoho, Kofi, "Cross rhythms", Volume 1, Occasional papers in African folklore, p 118, Trickster Press (1983)
- Sheldon, Kathleen E., "Historical dictionary of women in Sub-Saharan Africa, vol. 1, Scarecrow Press, 2005, p. 148 ISBN 0-8108-5331-0
- Adande, Alexis B.A., & Arinze, Emmanuel, "The place of Women in the Museum of Saint-Louis, [in] Museums & urban culture in West Africa, Institut africain international, Oxford, 2002, p. 145-146 ISBN 0-85255-276-9
- Fage, John D., Oliver, Roland, "The Cambridge history of Africa: From c. 1600 to c. 1790", p 486, ISBN 0-521-20981-1
- Diouf, Niokhobaye. Chronique du royaume du Sine. Suivie de notes sur les traditions orales et les sources écrites concernant le royaume du Sine par Charles Becker et Victor Martin. (1972). Bulletin de l'Ifan, Tome 34, Série B, n° 4, (1972). pp. 726–729 (PDF: pp. 16–18)
