= Bethio =

Coordinates: 16.27565°N 16.13618°W

The Principality of Bethio (also spelled Bequio, Bekio, Bitio, Bétio or Beetyo) was a small monarchy located for centuries along the lower Senegal River valley, on the border between modern Mauritania and Senegal, in the northeast of Biffeche. In the 18th century it was also called the "Royaume d'Oral." Its capital was at Poum, then moved to N'Dombo, and finally moved to Ross, Senegal in the 19th century (called Ross Béthio since then). The original, fertile farmlands of Bethio are in a region just east of the Djoudj National Bird Sanctuary.

In the 1720s, the Brak (king) of Waalo was Erim M'Bagnick (Yérim Mbañik) and Béquio Malicouri, king of the Royaume d'Oral was his vassal. Maalixuri (Malichouri) (Malikhuri Diop ) played a vital intermiediary role between the Kingdom of Waalo and the French at Saint-Louis, Senegal, accumulating power and influence. He attempted to secede from Waalo in 1724 and burned Rosso, but was defeated and driven into exile in Cayor, where he died. He was succeeded by Fara Coro.

Today, Abdoulaye Diop, the current Prince Bethio, lives at Ross-Bethio where he is a Senegalese political leader.

== Notes ==
- The name also appears as Béco and appears synonymous with the Island of Becos in the river delta. It has been suggested that this is the island nowadays known as Baba Gueye.
