= Battle of Dioubouldou =

French-Waalo Battle of 1855

- Part of the Second Franco-Trarza War
Date	25 February 1855
Location	Plain of Dioubouldou, Senegal
Result	French victory

Belligerents
France	Waalo Kingdom; Emirate of Trarza

Commanders and leaders
Louis Faidherbe	Ndaté Yalla Mbodj

Strength
850 men 2 cannons	Unknown

Casualties and losses
3 killed 8 wounded	100 killed 150 captured many wounded

The Battle of Dioubouldou (sometimes spelled Jubuldu, Dioubouldy or Dybuldu) was fought on 25 February 1855 between French forces of Colonel Louis Faidherbe and the combined Waalo and Trarza forces under Queen Ndaté Yalla Mbodj.

== Background ==
Although they were historical enemies, relations between Waalo and Trarzas had recently got a bit warmer when Mohamed El-Habib married the sister of Queen Ndaté. Together, they started challenging the growing influence of the French in the vicinity of Saint-Louis.

In January 1855, Queen Ndaté sent an imperious letter to French governor Louis Faidherbe, ordering him to evacuate the outskirts of Saint-Louis immediately. In response, Faidherbe gathered troops and local volunteers and departed from Saint-Louis in order to march on N'Der, the village of Queen Ndaté.

== Battle ==
On 25 February, the French column, composed of 400 regulars, 400 volunteers (Note: Volunteers were armed civilians of Saint-Louis (mostly black or mixed-race) who willingly took part in French expeditions alongside French troops, either due to shared interests or out of desire for potential loot. Due to the very low manpower allocated to the colony of Senegal by France in that era (four companies of 140 men each), Governors heavily relied on volunteers until the creation of the Senegalese Tirailleurs corps in 1857.) from Saint-Louis and a platoon of colonial cavalry, met with the Waalo-Trarza army near a wood in the plain of Dioubouldou, not far from N'Der. Queen Ndaté's forces had been waiting here for French. Trarza cavalry was positioned at the center, while Waalo infantry was disposed on each sides of the cavalry. A large number of Waalo warriors were also hidden in the field of tall grass that separated the French from the Waalo-Trarza army.

Colonel Faidherbe started by firing some artillery rounds on the field, which caused great disorder in Waalo ranks. He then sent a company of marines under Captain Benoit and a group of volunteers led by a man named Amadou Sar to attack the warriors in the grass. Meanwhile the French rearguard, which consisted in a company of marines under Captain Bruyas, easily repulsed an attempt at envelopment by Trarza cavalry. French cavalry was then sent against the retreating Waalo warriors, turning their flight into a complete rout.

== Aftermath ==
Following the rout of the Waalo-Trarza army, Queen Ndaté fled to Cayor with her followers. French forces captured the village of N'Der, residence of Queen Ndaté and de facto capital of the Waalo Kingdom, which had been deserted by its inhabitants. The volunteers thoroughly looted the deserted village, which was then set on fire. Several nearby villages were also looted, and the French column eventually went back home to Saint-Louis with a large booty of over 2,000 cows and oxen, 50 donkeys and 30 horses.
