= N'Der =

- Town
- Location within Senegal
- Coordinates: 16°16′N 15°53′W
- Country: Senegal
- Region: Saint-Louis Region
- Department: Dagana Department

Population
  - Total: 868
- Time zone: UTC+0 (GMT)

N'Der (also spelled Nder or Ndeer) is a small town on the western shore of the Lac de Guiers, in northern Senegal. It was the third and last capital of Waalo until the annexion of the kingdom by France in 1855.

== Geography ==
N'Der is located on the Western shore of the Lac de Guiers. The nearest settlements are Sadiale, Nieti Yone, Mbane and Naere.

== History ==
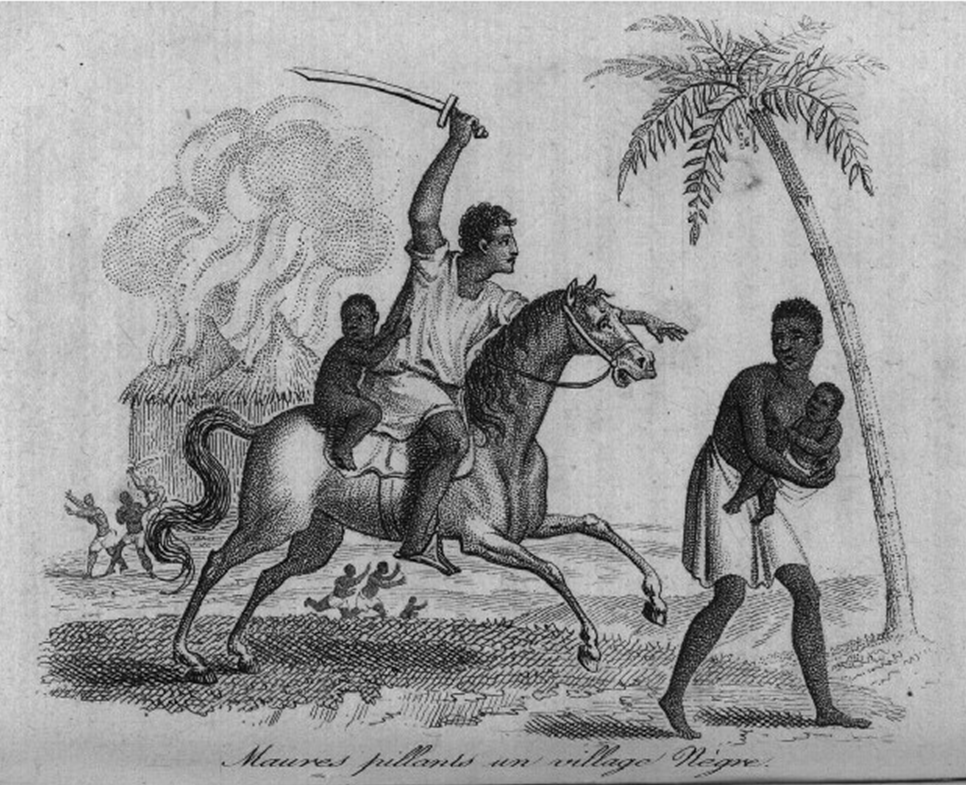
An 1814 French illustration depicting of a Moorish slave raid in Senegal.

In 1733, N'Der became the third capital in the history of Waalo as Brak Njak Aram moved there from Njurbel, the previous capital.

=== N'Der resistance ===
In 1819, as the Brak Amar Fatim Borso and most of his warriors had traveled to Saint-Louis to have their wounds treated at the French hospital after a battle against Trarza Moors, the undefended capital became the target of a slave raid by the Trarza army. After sending their children to hide in the fields, the women of N'Der organized a desperate resistance against the Trarzas. Although they managed to repulse a first assault, the Trarza warriors soon attacked again and all of the Wolof women decided to commit suicide by fire rather than being enslaved by the Moors.

On 25 February 1855, the village was captured and burned down by the French after the Battle of Dioubouldou. The village was soon rebuilt, but its importance greatly diminished following the exile of Queen Ndaté Yalla and the annexion of Waalo to the French colony of Saint-Louis.

In late May 1857, eight French soldiers in a small blockhouse repulsed a Trarza attack on the village.

== Administration ==
N'Der is part of the Communauté rurale de Ngnith in the Dagana Department of the Saint-Louis Region.

== Demography ==
As of the last census, the town counted 868 inhabitants, in 101 households.
