= Lac de Guiers =

Lake in Senegal

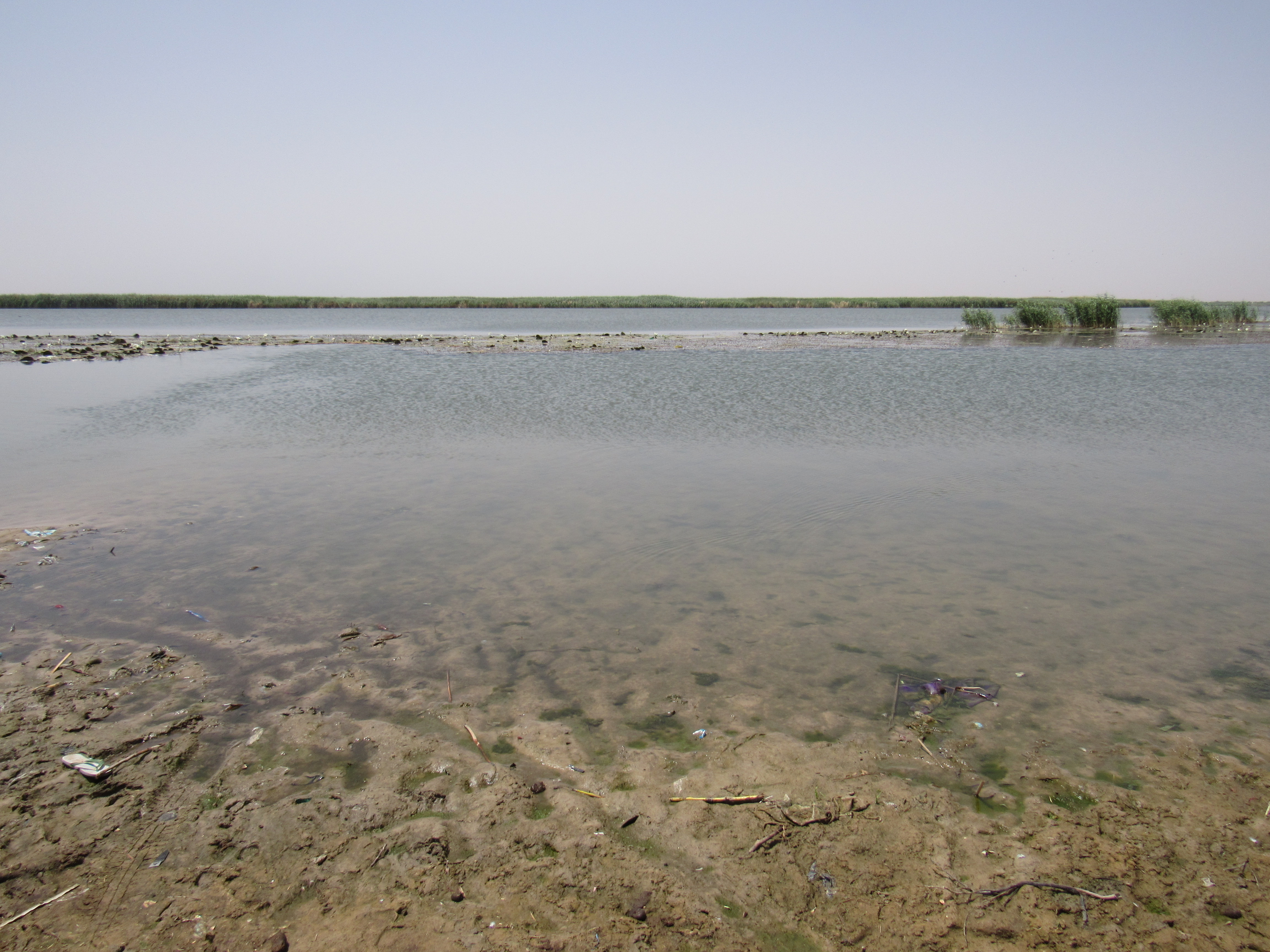

- Location within Senegal
- Coordinates: 16°15′N 15°50′W
- Basin countries: Senegal
- Max. length: 35 km (22 mi)
- Max. width: 8 km (5.0 mi)
- Surface area: 17,000 ha (42,000 acres)

The Lac de Guiers or Lake Guiers is a lake in northern Senegal, south of the city of Richard-Toll and in the Louga and Saint-Louis regions. It is a chief source of fresh water for the city of Dakar, hundreds of kilometers to the south-west, through underground pipes.

== Appearance ==
It is about 35 kilometers long and 8 kilometers wide, and is supplied by the Ferlo or Bounoum River, which flows north into its southern end, from Fouta in the rainy season. Water flows out to the Senegal River north through the Taouey, which has been straightened and canalized as it passes through Richard-Toll. A dam was built in 1916 to prevent saltwater flowing in.

The shores are mostly fertile. The north shore and surrounding area have been converted to a large sugar-growing region irrigated with water from the lake.

== Important Bird Area ==
Lac de Guiers is designated an Important Bird Area by BirdLife International; the key species are lesser flamingo (Phoeniconaias minor), glossy ibis (Plegadis falcinellus), Eurasian spoonbill (Platalea leucorodia), African spoonbill (Platalea alba), white-winged tern (Chlidonias leucopterus) and river prinia (Prinia fluviatilis).

== History ==
The lake has a complicated history involving the kingdoms of Tekrur and Waalo and the Empire of Jolof (Diolof). Notably, the settlement of N'Der, the third and final capital of the former Kingdom of Waalo, was located on the west shores of the Lake. The royal compound or "keur" is still there. Previously Lac de Guiers was called Lac du Panier Foule or Pania Fuli, referring to the Fula people.
