= States headed by Serer Lamanes =

List of states headed by the Serer Lamanes

This is a list of states headed by the Serer Lamanes. The Lamanes (or Lamans) have a historical, economic and religious significance in Serer countries. The following pre-colonial kingdoms and new states (post-independence) were for a long time dominated by the Serer Lamanic class :

- Kingdom of Sine
- Kingdom of Saloum
- Kingdom of Baol
- Kingdom of Jolof
- Kingdom of Waalo
- Kingdom of Tekrur
- Cayor

== Notes ==
=== Bibliography ===
- Gravrand, Henry, "La Civilisation Sereer - Cosaan : Les origines", vol. 1, Nouvelles Editions africaines, 1983, ISBN 2-7236-0877-8
- Gravrand, Henry, "La civilisation Sereer, Pangool, Dakar, Nouvelles Editions Africaines (1990), ISBN 2-7236-1055-1
- Becker, Charles: Vestiges historiques, trémoins matériels du passé clans les pays sereer, Dakar. 1993. CNRS – ORS TO M
- Sarr, Alioune, "Histoire du Sine-Saloum", Introduction, bibliographie et Notes par Charles Becker, BIFAN, Tome 46, Serie B, n° 3–4, 1986–1987, p21
- Boulègue, Jean. "Le Grand Jolof, (XVIIIe – XVIe Siècle)", (Paris, Edition Façades), Karthala (1987),
- Dyao, Yoro, "Légendes et coutumes sénégalaises", Cahiers de Yoro Dyao: publiés et commentés par Henri Gaden. (E. Leroux, 1912)
- Galvan, Dennis Charles, "The State Must Be Our Master of Fire" : How Peasants Craft Culturally Sustainable Development in Senegal" Berkeley, University of California Press, 2004, ISBN 0-520-23591-6
- Diop, Cheikh Anta, "Towards the African Renaissance: Essays in African Culture & Development, 1946-1960." Translated by Egbuna P. Modum. Karnak House (1996), pp. 29-30, ISBN 9780907015857
