= Njembot Mbodj =

Lingeer (Queen) of Waalo, a Senegambian precolonial kingdom

- Lingeer

Co-ruling Queen (Lingeer) of Waalo
- Reign: 1820–1846
- Predecessor: Fatim Yamar
- Successor: Ndaté Yalla Mbodj
- Kings: See list: Amar Fatim Borso Mbodj (until 1825); Yerim Mbanyik (1825–27); Fara Penda (1827–30, 1832–33, 1835–40); Kherfi (1830–32, 1833–35); Malick Mbodj (since 1840)
- Born: c. 1800 or c. 1811
- Died: 1 October 1846
- Spouse: Muhammad al-Habib, Emir of Trarza
- Issue: Ely Ould Muhammad al-Habib, Emir of Trarza
- Dynasty: Mbodj (paternal line); Tedyek (maternal line)
- Father: Amar Fatim Borso Mbodj
- Mother: Fatim Yamar

Njembot Mbodj (or Njembot Mbooj or Njëmbët Mbooj, variations: Ndjeumbeut Mbodj or Djembet Mbodj, c. 1800 – 1846 or c. 1811—1846) was a Lingeer (Queen) of Waalo, a Senegambian precolonial kingdom which is now part of present-day Senegal.

After her mother Lingeer Fatim Yamar's death in 1820, despite her youth, Njembot Mbodj succeeded her mother and ascended to the throne as Lingeer.

Njembot Mbodj became ruler at an early age, after the deaths of her parents. She soon proved herself an able leader despite her youth; in this, she was aided by her personality, which has been described as being both assertive and brave. In 1831 she got her uncle, Fara Penda Adam Sall Mbodj, elected as brak to replace her cousin Yerim Bagnik Teg Rela Mbodj. After the withdrawal of the French, the Trarza invaded Waalo in an attempt to destabilize the kingdom. Njembot Mbodj arranged for herself a marriage with the leader of the Trarza, Muhammad al-Habib (with whom she had a son called Ely), which united the two kingdoms and made it easier for them to oppose French interests. Forced to flee to Kayor by the Franco-Trarzan War of 1825, she was later able to return home and to contain the power struggle in Waalo. In 1840, at the death of the brak, she managed to engineer the election of Malick Mbodj as replacement. Njembot Mbodj herself died in 1846, and was succeeded by her sister Ndate Yalla Mbodj.
