= Vincent Monteil =

French conductor (born 1964)

Vincent Monteil (born 1964) is a French conductor. He was born in Angers.

== Education ==
Monteil studied in several national conservatories in France before completing a degree in musicology at the Sorbonne University in Paris and beginning his conducting training with Maestros Gérard Devos and Pierre Dervaux.

From 1991 to 1996, Monteil was assistant conductor at the Toulouse Capitole Opera, where he studied thoroughly French Music with Michel Plasson. This tenure gave him the opportunity to work with conductors such as Friedemann Layer, Maurizio Arena, Richard Bradshaw, Woldemar Nelsson and Donato Renzetti, and singers such as Roberto Alagna, José van Dam, Jean-Philippe Lafont, Leontina Vaduva, Nuccia Focile, Françoise Pollet, and Catherine Malfitano. In 1995, Nicolas Joel, director of the Toulouse Capitole Opera asked him to conduct Giacomo Puccini's La bohème.

== Career ==
In 1996, Monteil was appointed associate conductor of Nice Philharmonic Orchestra (France) for six-year tenure. He conducted more than 30 performances a year, including symphonic repertoire, ballet, opera and contemporary music. Gian Carlo del Monaco, director of Nice National Opera, entrusted to him the music direction of several operas such as Mozart's The Marriage of Figaro (1996), Puccini's Madama Butterfly (1998), Humperdinck's Hänsel und Gretel (1998 and 2000), and Poulenc's La voix humaine (1998). He also conducted different ballets such as Orff's Carmina Burana (1999), Prokofiev's Romeo and Juliet (2001) and many symphonic concerts with famous soloists like Marielle Nordmann, Patrice Fontanarosa, Paul Meyer, Bernard Soustrot, Jacques Taddei, Maxence Larrieu, Pascal Rogé and Gabriel Tacchino. In addition to his duties with the Opera and the Orchestra, Vincent Monteil took an active part into the creation of many contemporary works during the MANCA festival in Nice.

From 1999 to 2003, Monteil began his collaboration with the Prague State Opera (Czech Republic). In 2002, he conducted a French trilogy: Bizet's Carmen, Meyerbeer's Robert le Diable, and Dukas's Ariane et Barbe-Bleue. To celebrate the Berlioz bicentennial, he conducted Béatrice et Bénédict. The operas he recorded there earned him wide recognition as a specialist of French repertoire. Consequently, Sir John Eliot Gardiner invited him to prepare a new production of Ariane et Barbe-Bleue in Zürich.

Monteil is often invited abroad (Spain, Italy, Germany, Czech Republic, Hungary, Serbia or Russia) acting as an ambassador of French music. He is Laureate of the program “Un Chef, Un Orchestre” from the French Foreign Office in Paris for his contribution to the development of French music abroad.

From 2007, Monteil has been the music director of the OSYJ 31, Youth Orchestra of Toulouse. Monteil has been music director of the Opera Studio of the ONR since 2008, and music advisor to the ONR since 2011.

In 2012 he began a three-year collaboration as artistic director of Cantiere Internazionale d'Arte in Montepulciano, Tuscany.
