= Waalo =

Former kingdom in West Africa

Kingdom of Walo Waalo
- 1287–1855
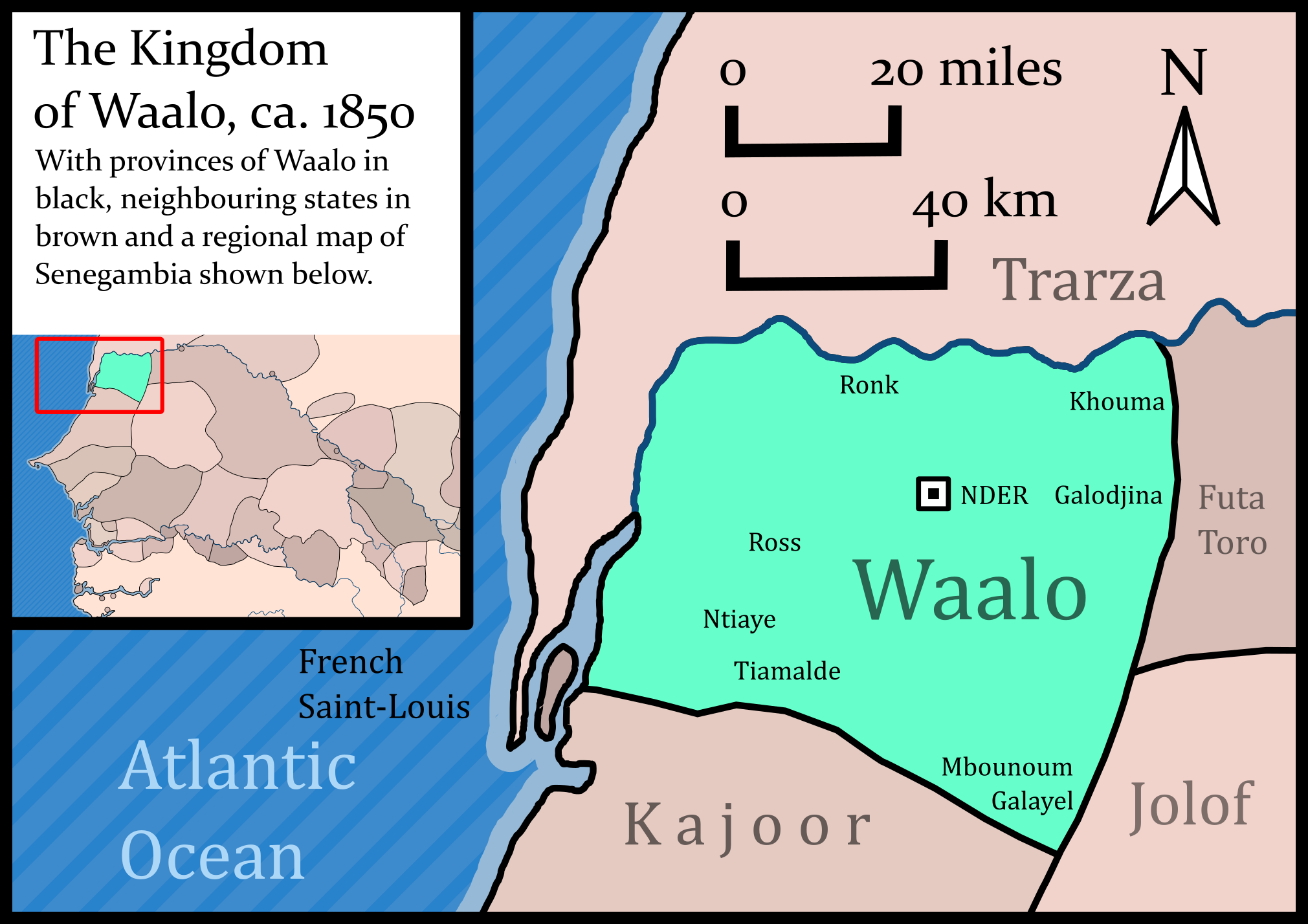
- Waalo ca. 1850
- Status: Kingdom
- Capital: Ndiourbel; Ndiangué; Nder
- Common languages: Wolof
- Religion: African traditional religion; Islam
- Government: Monarchy
- Brak
- History
  - Waalo founded by Ndiadiane Ndiaye: 1287
  - part of the Jolof Empire: c. 1350-1549 (de facto) / 1715 (de jure)
  - French colonization: 1855
Preceded by	Succeeded by
Takrur	French West Africa

Waalo (Wolof: Waalo) was a kingdom on the lower Senegal River in West Africa, in what is now Senegal and Mauritania. It included parts of the valley proper and areas north and south, extending to the Atlantic Ocean. To the north were Moorish emirates; to the south was the kingdom of Cayor; to the east was Jolof.

== History ==
=== Origins ===
Oral histories claim that, before becoming a kingdom, the area of Waalo was ruled by a patchwork of Lamanes, a Serer title meaning the original owner of the land. Etymological evidence suggests that the area was ruled by the Jaa'ogo dynasty of Takrur. This aligns with early Arabic written sources which describe an island town known as Awlil (Waalo) near the mouth of the Senegal river, in a region called Senghana.

=== Founding ===
The exact founding date of Waalo is debated by historians, but is associated with the rule of the first king, the semi-legendary Ndiadiane Ndiaye, in 1287. Ndiaye, originally a Fula from Takrur, united the Lamanes and ruled Waalo for 16 years as an arbiter or judge rather than king before, according to some oral accounts, being driven out by his half brother Barka Bo, or Barka Mbodj. After this, Ndiaye took control of Jolof and founded the Jolof Empire. Barka Mbodj was the first ruler to use the royal title 'Brak'. Ndiaye eventually made Waalo a vassal.

Europeans first appeared off the coast of Waalo in the 15th century, and soon began trading. This caused a significant shift in economic power away from the Jolof heartland towards coastal vassals such as Waalo and Cayor. Buumi Jelen, a member of the royal family, may have established his own control over Waalo during this period, and is credited with creating a system of alkaldes who served as customs collectors for the Buurba Jolof. He later attempted to ally with the Portuguese to take power, but was killed by his erstwhile allies in a dispute.

The Jolof empire broke up in the aftermath of the battle of Danki in 1549, though the Brak continued to pay symbolic tribute to the Bourba Jolof until 1715.

=== The French and the Desert ===
In 1638, the French established the first permanent European trading settlement at the mouth of the Senegal River, moving to the site of Saint-Louis in 1659 while facing consistent military and political pressure from the Brak. The French presence would have a decisive effect on the rest of the history of Waalo.

Partly in response to the shift in trade away from Berber tribes to the French, Nasr ad-Din, a Berber Marabout, launched the Char Bouba War or the Marabout War, overthrowing the ruling aristocracy of Waalo (among other Senegal river kingdoms) in an attempt to establish an Islamic theocracy. Upon his death in 1674, however, his movement collapsed and the old hierarchies, aligned with Arab Hassan tribes north of the river and vigorously supported by the French, re-asserted themselves.

During this same period, Moroccan forces came south to the Senegal river, forcing the Brak to move the capital from Ngurbel to the south bank and permanently breaking the kingdom's control on the north side.

=== A Regional Power ===
In another attempt to further strengthen their economic position in the Senegal valley, in 1724 the French allied with Maalixuri, the lord of Bethio, to pressure the Brak Yerim Mbyanik and the Emirate of Trarza into concessions. His attempt at secession from Waalo failed when the French company stopped their support. By 1734 Yerim Mbyanik had the most powerful army in the region. His rule and that of his two successors, Njaam Aram Bakar and Naatago Aram, was the apogee of Waalo-Waalo power.

Through the middle decades of the 18th century, Waalo exerted hegemony over the entire Senegal estuary and dominated Cayor as well. When the English took Saint-Louis in 1758 they found that the Brak had total control over river trade. Naatago repeatedly demanded increases in customs payments and slave prices, and blockaded the island when necessary. In 1762 he appropriated payments from Cayor intended for Saint-Louis, and two years later invaded.

=== Decline ===
In 1765 the Damel of Cayor counterattacked, armed with English guns, and soundly defeated the Waalo-Waalo. After Naatago's death in 1766 a long civil war broke out, with the Moors constantly intervening and raiding. In 1775 the English took more than 8000 slaves from Waalo in less than six months.

With recurring civil war and frequent foreign meddling in succession disputes, Waalo's power declined progressively in favor of the Moorish Emirate of Trarza.

In the 1820s the marabout of Koki Ndiaga Issa, who had amassed significant political power in Cayor, was driven out by the damel. His forces, led by general Dille Thiam, took control of Waalo instead. The French intervened however, and killed Thiam.

To stop the cripplying Moorish raids and present a unified front against the French, the Lingeer Njembot Mbodj married the Emir of Trarza in 1833. Faced with an alliance that could threaten the survival of the colony, Saint Louis attacked Waalo, deepening the long-running crisis. Njembot Mbodj was succeeded by her sister Ndate Yalle in 1847, but the French finally conquered the kingdom in 1855.

== Society ==
=== Government ===
The royal capital of Waalo was first Ndiourbel (Guribel) on the north bank of the Senegal River (in modern Mauritania), then Ndiangué on the south bank of the river. The capital was moved to Nder on the west shore of the Lac de Guiers.

Waalo had a complicated political and social system, which has a continuing influence on Wolof culture in Senegal today, especially its highly formalized and rigid caste system. The kingdom was indirectly hereditary, ruled by three matrilineal families: the Logar, the Tedyek, and the Joos, all from different ethnic backgrounds. The Joos were of Serer origin. This Serer matriclan was established in Waalo by Lingeer Ndoye Demba of Sine. Her grandmother Lingeer Fatim Beye is the matriarch and early ancestor of this dynasty. These matrilineal families engaged in constant dynastic struggles to become "Brak" or king of Waalo, as well as warring with Waalo's neighbors. The royal title "Lingeer" means queen or royal princess, used by the Serer and Wolof. Several Lingeer, notably Njembot Mbodj and Ndaté Yalla Mbodj ruled Waalo in their own right or as regents.

The Brak ruled with a kind of legislature, the Seb Ak Baor, that consisted of three great electors who selected the next king. Their titles come from Pulaar terms that initially meant 'masters of initiation', and originate from the period before Ndiadiane Ndiaye when Takrur dominated the area. There was also a complicated hierarchy of officials and dignitaries. Women had high positions and figured prominently in the political and military history of Waalo.

Provinces were ruled by semi-independent Kangam, such as the Bethio. Shifting allegiances between these powerful nobles, the Brak, other kingdoms, and the French of Saint-Louis led to a series of civil wars.

=== Religion ===
Waalo had its own traditional African religion. Islam was initially the province of the elite, but in the aftermath of Marabout War the ruling class increasingly rejected it while it become more and more widespread among the ruled. The Brak himself converted only in the 19th century.

== Economy ==
Waalo played an integral role in the slave trade in the Senegal river valley, with most captives coming from regions upriver, often captured in war or slaving raids. Other trade goods included gum arabic, leather, and ivory, as well as the foodstuffs, primarily millet upon which Saint-Louis depended.

Waalo was paid fees for every boatload of gum arabic or slaves that was shipped on the river, in return for its "protection" of the trade.

== List of rulers ==
=== Kings of Waalo ===
In all, Waalo had 52 kings since its founding. Names and dates taken from John Stewart's African States and Rulers (1989), but are in many cases speculative and disputed by historians, especially for the earlier kings. John Donnelly Fage dates Ndiadiane Ndiaye to the fourteenth-century, with the Waalo kings lists pointing to the second half of the fourteenth century. Jean Boulegue adjusted these same lists using early written sources to estimate a date around 1300.

#	Name	Reign Start	Reign End
1	N'Dya-N'Dya	1186	1202
2	Mbang Waad	1202	1211
3	Barka Mbody	1211	1225
4	Tyaaka Mbar	1225	1242
5	unknown	1242	1251
6	Amadu Faaduma	1251	1271
7	Yerim Mbanyik	1271	1278
8	Tyukuli	1278	1287
9	Naatago Tany	1287	1304
10	Fara Yerim	1304	1316
11	Mbay Yerim	1316	1331
12	Dembaane Yerim	1331	1336
13	N'dyak Kumba Sam Dyakekh	1336	1343
14	Fara Khet	1343	1348
15	N'dyak Kumba-gi tyi Ngelogan	1348	1355
16	N'dyak Kumba-Nan Sango	1355	1367
17	N'dyak Ko N'Dyay Mbanyik	1367	1380
18	Mbany Naatago	1380	1381
19	Meumbody N'dyak	1381	1398
20	Yerim Mbanyik Konegil	1398	1415
21	Yerim Kode	1415	1485
22	Fara Toko	1485	1488
23	Fara Penda Teg Rel	1488	1496
24	Tykaaka Daro Khot	1496	1503
25	Naatago Fara N'dyak	1503	1508
26	Naatago Yerim	1508	1519
27	Fara Penda Dyeng	1519	1531
28	Tani Fara N'dyak	1531	1542
29	Fara Koy Dyon	1542	1549
30	Fara Koy Dyop	1549	1552
31	Fara Penda Langan Dyam	1552	1556
32	Fara Ko Ndaama	1556	1563
33	Fara Aysa Naalem	1563	1565
34	Naatago Kbaari Daaro	1565	1576
35	Beur Tyaaka Loggar	1576	1640
36	Yerim Mbanyik Aram Bakar	1640	1674
37	Naatago Aram Bakar	1674	1708
38	N'dyak Aram Bakar Teedyek	1708	1733
39	Yerim N'date Bubu	1733	1734
40	Meu Mbody Kumba Khedy	1734	1735
41	Yerim Mbanyik Anta Dyop	1735	
42	Yerim Khode Fara Mbuno	1735	1736
43	N'dyak Khuri Dyop	1736	1780
44	Fara Penda Teg Rel	1780	1792
45	N'dyak Kumba Khuri Yay	1792	1801
46	Saayodo Yaasin Mbody	1801	1806
47	Kruli Mbaaba	1806	1812
48	Amar Faatim Borso	1812	1821
49	Yerim Mbanyik Teg	1821	1823
50	Fara Penda Adam Sal	1823	1837
51	Kherfi Khari Daano	1837	1840
52	Mbeu Mbody Maalik	1840	1855

=== Co-ruling Queens of Waalo ===
These Queens of Waalo, as legitimate heiresses to the crown, selected the King (Brak) to share the crown with the Queen (Lingeer).

- Tegue Rella Khouriyaye (r. ?—c. 1800s) – the sister and predecessor of Fatim Yamar
- Fatim Yamar (r. c. 1810s—1820)
- Njembot Mbodj (r. 1820—1846)
- Ndaté Yalla Mbodj (r. 1846—1855)
