= Wolof people =

West African ethnic group

Total population
- 7,902,000

Regions with significant populations
- Senegal: 7,192,000
- Gambia: 300,000
- Mauritania: 230,000
- France: 70,000
- Mali: 60,000
- Spain: 50,000

Languages
- Wolof

Religion
- Islam

Related ethnic groups
- Serer Lebou

- People: Wolof
- Language: Wolof làkk
- Country: Jolof Empire (Kingdom)

The Wolof people (UK: /ˈwoʊlɒf/) are a Niger-Congo ethnic group native to the Senegambia region of West Africa. Senegambia is today split between western Senegal, northwestern Gambia and coastal Mauritania; the Wolof form the largest ethnic group within Senegambia. In Senegal as a whole, the Wolof are the largest ethnic group (~39.7%), while elsewhere they are a minority. They refer to themselves as Wolof and speak the Wolof language, in the West Atlantic branch of the Niger–Congo family of languages; English inherited Wolof as both the adjectival ethnonym and the name of the language.

Their early history is unclear. The earliest documented mention of the Wolof is found in the records of 15th-century, Portuguese-financed Italian traveller Alvise Cadamosto, who mentioned well-established Islamic Wolof chiefs advised by Muslim counselors. The Wolof belonged to the medieval-era Wolof Empire of the Senegambia region.

Details of the pre-Islamic religious traditions of the Wolof are unknown, and their oral traditions state them to have been adherents of Islam since the founding of the Kingdom of Jolof. However, historical evidence left by Islamic scholars and European travelers suggest that Wolof warriors and rulers did not initially convert to Islam, although accepting and relying on Muslim clerics as counselors and administrators. In and after the 18th century, the Wolof were impacted by the violent jihads in West Africa, which triggered internal disagreements about Islam among the Wolof. In the 19th century, as the colonial French forces launched a war against the Wolof kingdoms, the Wolof people resisted the French and converted to Islam. Contemporary Wolofs are predominantly Sunni Muslims belonging to Mouride and Tijaniyyah Islamic brotherhoods.

The Wolof people, like other West African ethnic groups, historically maintained a rigid, endogamous social stratification that included nobility, clerics, castes, and slaves. The Wolof were close to the French colonial rulers, became integrated into the colonial administration, and have dominated the culture and economy of Senegal since the country's independence from France on 4 April 1960.

They are also referred to as the Wollof, Jolof, Iolof, Whalof, Ialof, Olof, and Volof, among other spellings.

== Name ==
The term Wolof also refers to the Wolof language and to their states, cultures, and traditions. Older French publications frequently employ the spelling Ouolof; up to the 19th century, the spellings Wolof, Wolluf, Volof, and Olof are also encountered, among rarer variants like Yolof, Dylof, Chelof, Galof, Lolof, and others. In English, Wollof and Woloff are found, particularly in reference to the Gambian Wolof; for English-speakers, the spelling Wollof is closer to the native pronunciation of the name.) The spelling Jolof is also often used, but in particular reference to the Jolof Empire and Jolof Kingdom that existed in central Senegal from the 14th to the 19th centuries. Similarly, a West African rice dish is known in English as Jollof rice.

== History ==
The origins of the Wolof people are obscure, states David Gamble, a professor of anthropology and African studies specializing in Senegambia. Archeological artifacts have been discovered in Senegal and The Gambia, such as pre-historic pottery, the 8th-century stones, and 14th-century burial mounds, but, states Gamble, these provide no evidence that links them exclusively to the Wolof ethnic group. Their name as the Wolof first appears in the records of 15th-century Portuguese travelers.

With the Arab conquests of West Africa in last centuries of the 1st millennium CE, one theory states that the Wolof people were forced to move into north and east Senegal where over time villages and towns developed into autonomous states such as Baol, Kayor, Saloum, Dimar, Walo, and Sine the overall ruling state being that of Jolof who came together voluntarily to form the Jolof Empire. According to Gamble, this migration likely occurred at the end of 11th century when the Ghana Empire fell to the Muslim armies from Sudan.

Another oral tradition tells of a legend in Walo, which starts with two villages near a lake in a dispute. A mysterious person arose from the lake to settle the dispute. The villagers detained him; he settled among them and became the one who settled disputes and sovereign authority. He was called Ndyadyane Ndyaye, and his descendants were called Ndiayes or Njie, and these led to ruling families of Wolof, Mali according to this mythical legend. The documented history, from 15th-century onwards, is a complex story of the rivalry between powerful families, wars, coups and conquests in Wolof society.

=== Wolof Empire ===
Locator map for Wolof ethnic distribution. This shows areas of traditional concentration of the Wolof communities. Distribution of self-identified Wolof people is more comprehensive, populations are intermixed, and the use of Wolof language has come to be near-universal in Senegal.

The Jolof or Wolof Empire was a medieval West African state that ruled in modern day Senegal, portions in Southern Mauritania and the Gambia from approximately 1350 to 1890. While only ever consolidated into a single state structure for part of this time, the tradition of governance, caste, and culture of the Wolof dominate the history of north-central Senegal for much of the last 800 years. Its final demise at the hands of French colonial forces in the 1870s–1890s also marks the beginning of the formation of Senegal as a unified state.

By the end of the 15th century, the Wolof states of Jolof, Kayor, Baol, and Walo had become united in a federation with Jolof as the metropolitan power. The position of king was held by the Burba Wolof, and the rulers of the other component states owed loyalty and tribute payments to him. Before the Wolof people became involved in goods and slave trading with the Portuguese merchants on the coast, they had a long tradition of established trading of goods and slaves with the Western Sudanese empires and with Imamate of Futa Toro and other ethnic groups in North Africa.

=== Atlantic Slave Trade ===
Slavery had been a part of the Wolof culture since their earliest recorded history. Prior to the arrival of Europeans to regions inhabited by the Wolof, slaves there were either born into slavery, enslaved via purchase or captured in warfare. Beginning in the 16th century, Portuguese slave traders started to purchase slaves from Senegambian ports to transport to their American colonies as well as Cape Verde. These slaves frequently passed through Wolof lands before arriving at the coast. As the European demand for slaves increased during the 17th and 18th centuries, the Wolof people became both victims and victimisers in the selling of slaves to Europeans. This era saw a corresponding increase in Wolof slave raids to acquire captives to transport to the coast and trade for European firearms. Wolof people, known to the Spanish as jelofes, were among the first African slaves to arrive in the Americas, when a group of enslaved Wolof landed in Hispaniola, in 1522. They were also the first African slaves to arrive to Costa Rica and Panama. Albeit Islam was outlawed in the Spanish Empire among the Wolof people were some of the first Muslim populations to arrive the Americas. By one estimate the Wolof, Mandinka and Tukulor made up almost 30% of the African population of Mexico in 1549. Enslaved Wolof were also present in Peru and Cartagena de Indias in present-day Colombia.

The transatlantic slave trade led to the Wolof acquiring European firearms, which were bartered for slaves on the West African coast. With these firearms, the intensity and violence of slave raids perpetrated both by and against the Wolof increase. As a result, conflict with other ethnic groups also increased. An example is the war between the Wolof and Fulani in the 1790s and early 1800s, which led to the ensalvement of Anta Madjiguène Ndiaye. However, these slave raids eventually began to subside as European and American governments progressively outlawed their nations' involvement in the slave trade. During the New Imperialism era, the Scramble for Africa saw the majority of African territory, including lands inhabited by the Wolof, fall under European colonial rule. These new colonial regimes moved to outlaw slavery, and by the 1890s, the French authorities in West Africa had largely abolished the institution. However, the social distinctions between free-born Wolof and slaves remained present during the period of colonial rule, continuing even after the decolonisation of Africa in the mid-20th century, which saw the Wolof become independent from European colonial rule.

== Demographics ==
The Wolof people are the largest ethnic group in Senegal, particularly concentrated in its northwestern region near the Senegal River and the Gambia River. In the Gambia, about 16% of the population are Wolof. In the Gambia, they are a minority. However, Wolof language and culture have a disproportionate influence because of their prevalence in Banjul, the Gambian capital, where a majority of the population is Wolof. In Mauritania, about 8% of the population are Wolof. Their total population exceeds 6 million in the three countries.

== Religion ==
The vast majority of Wolof people are Sunni Muslims. However, religious practice often contains local elements. The complicated relationship had led to the emergence of Sufi traditions from a historic and dominant Sunni Islam environment.

The pre-Islamic religious traditions of Wolof are unknown, and neither written nor oral traditions about their traditional religion are available. The oral traditions of the Wolof have legends that state them to have been adherents of Islam since the founding of their Kingdom of Jolof. However, historical evidence left by Islamic scholars and European travelers suggest that Wolof kings and warriors did not convert to Islam in the beginning and for many centuries while accepting and relying on Muslim clerics as counselors and administrators.

According to David Gamble, the pre-Islamic beliefs of Wolof may be reflected and absorbed in the Sufi beliefs about good and bad spirits (jinn), amulets, dances, and other rituals.

In and after the 18th century, the Wolofs were impacted by the violent jihads in West Africa, which triggered internal disagreements among the Wolof on Islam. Ira Lapidus, a professor of Middle Eastern and Islamic History, states that the early-19th-century Senegambian fighters "swept through Senegambia burning villages, killing pagans and enslaving their enemies," and were responsible for the conversion of substantial numbers of Wolof to Islam. The West African jihads that involved the Wolof and other ethnic groups started early and often inspired by militant reformers such as those of the 15th century. The assaults of the 18th and 19th century jihads, states Lapidus, paved the way for massive conversions to Islam, yet not a nearly universal conversion.

In the late 19th century, as the French colonial forces launched a war against the Wolof kingdoms, the Wolof people resisted the French and triggered the start of near-universal conversion of the Wolof people in Senegambia to Islam. Wolofs joined the various competing Sufi Muslim movements in the 20th century, particularly those belonging to the Mouride and Tijaniyyah Islamic brotherhoods.

The Senegalese Sufi Muslim brotherhoods appeared in the Wolof communities in the 19th century and grew in the 20th. The Sufi leaders and marabouts exercise cultural and political influence amongst most Muslim communities, most notably the leader of the Muridiyya also called the Mouride brotherhood.

In the 20th century, Ahmadiyya missionaries opened offices in contemporary Senegambia, but very few Wolof have become members of these.

== Culture ==
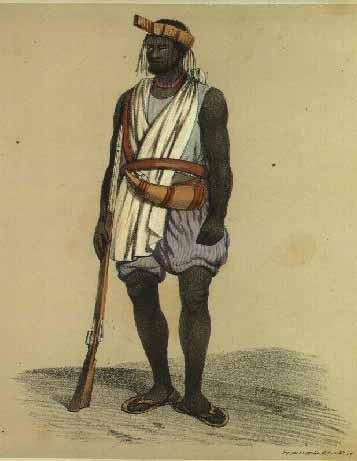
A Wolof Waalo in war costume in the mid 19th century

The Wolof people's traditional culture and practices have survived the colonial era and are a strong element of the Senegalese culture.

=== Language ===
Wolof (/ˈwɒlɒf/) is a language of Senegal, the Gambia, and Mauritania, and the native language of the Wolof people. Like the neighbouring languages Serer and Fula, it belongs to the Senegambian branch of the Niger–Congo language family. Unlike most other languages of Sub-Saharan Africa, Wolof is not a tonal language.

Wolof originated as the language of the Lebu people. It is the most widely spoken language in Senegal, spoken natively by the Wolof people (40% of the population) but also by most other Senegalese as a second language.

Wolof dialects vary geographically and between rural and urban areas. "Dakar-Wolof," for instance, is an urban mixture of Wolof, French, and Arabic.

=== Social stratification ===
The Wolof people have had a rigid, patriarchal, endogamous social stratified society at least since the 15th-century.

The social strata have included a free category called geer, a castes category called nyeenyo or neeno, and a servile category of slaves called jaam. Caste status has been hereditary, and endogamy among the men and women of a particular caste status has been an enduring feature among the Wolof people, according to Leonardo Villalón, a professor of Political Science and African Studies. The Wolof's caste status, states Villalón, is a greater barrier to inter-marriage than is either ethnicity or religion in Senegal.

The castes have also been hierarchal, with lowest level being those of griots. Their inherited inferiority has been culturally stated to be close to those of slaves (jaams or kaals). The castes, states David Gamble, were associated with ideas of relative purity/impurity. The leatherworkers, for example, were considered the lowest of the nyenyo because their occupation involving animal skins was considered dirty.

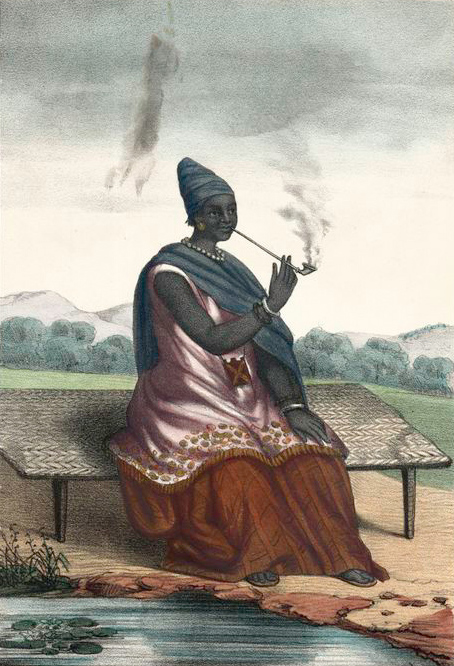
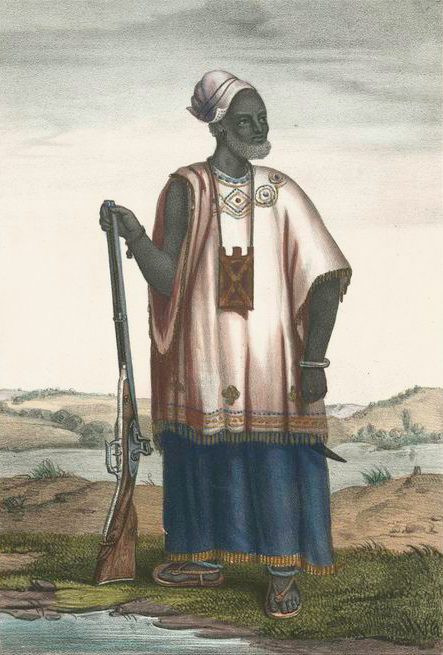
The queen and king of Wolof, an 1853 painting by David Boilat

Slaves have historically been a separate, endogamous group in the Wolof society. Slaves were either inherited by birth in the Wolof society, or were kidnapped, purchased as children from desperate parents during difficult times such as famine, or slavery was imposed by the village elders as a punishment for offenses. By the early 18th-century, all sorts of charges and petty crimes resulted in the accused being punished for the slave strata. Slaves acquired by kidnapping, purchase or as captives of war were called jaam say in the Wolof society.

The geer or "freeborn" too had a hierarchical structure. At the top were the royal rulers, below them were the regionally or locally dominant noble lineages who controlled territories and collected tribute, and below them were commoner freeborn called the baadoolo or "lacking power".

The chronological origin of social stratification based on castes and slavery is unclear, likely linked. Tal Tamari, an anthropological researcher at the Centre national de la recherche scientifique (CNRS) in Paris, suggests that a corollary of the rising slavery system was the development and growth of a caste system among Wolofs by the 15th century, and other ethnic groups of Africa by about the 13th century. However, according to Susan McIntosh, a professor of anthropology specializing in African societies, the emergence of caste systems in West African societies such as the Wolof, Mande, Malinke, Serer, and Soninke was likely older. She places the development and spread of castes in these societies to about the 10th century, because slave capture, slave trade, and slave holding by elite families across the Sahel, West Africa, and North Africa was an established institution by then, and slavery created a template for servile relationships and social stratification. According to Victoria B. Coifman, a professor of Afro-American and African studies, historical evidence suggests that the Wolof people were a matrilineal society before the 14th-century. Later politico-religious changes, such as those brought during the Wolof Empire era, introduced major changes in the social structure among the Wolofs and many other ethnic groups, including a shift to a patrilineal system.

The divisions, the endogamy among Wolof castes, social and political groups have persisted into the post-colonial independent Senegal.

=== Households ===
The Wolof are primarily rural (~75%), living in small villages. According to David Gamble, the historical evidence suggests Wolofs used to live in large settlements priors to the jihad wars and slave raids.

Wolof villages consist of a cluster of compounds. Some clusters are random with no central plaza, and many are clustered around a plaza with a mosque in the center. Each compound has either round or square huts made from adobe-like mud-millet stalk walls and thatched roofs with a conical shape. A compound is sometimes fenced with a hedge made from reeds or millet-stalk.

A single compound may have multiple huts, with a patrilocal male as its head, with a different wife and her children in each hut in polygynous households. A compound traditionally operates a joint kitchen, but if there are internal disputes then each family unit cooks separately.

A village is headed by a chief, called the borom dekk. This role belongs to a caste and has been hereditary. The chief has been the tribute (tax) collector and the interface between the kingdom officials and the villagers. Typically, the chief is also a Muslim religious leader, called seriñ (marabout). Larger villages have an imam, called the yélimaan, and a hunting or warriors leader called the saltigé. Both have traditionally been hereditary castes. Social relationships within a village are based on hierarchy, while disputes are typically settled with intermediaries and Muslim tribunals headed by an Islamic judge called a qadi.

==== Marriages ====
Marriages are endogamous. The preferred and common form of marriage is the bilateral cross-cousin type, with most preferred marriages are those between a man and the daughter of his mother's brother. Multiple marriages have been common, with many Wolof households featuring two wives. Dowery among the Wolof people is paid in the form of a brideprice. The dower is the property of the woman upon the consummation of the marriage.

While slavery is illegal in contemporary African societies, it was common in the history of Wolof people and among the elite castes. The slaves could not marry without the permission of their owner, and it was usually the responsibility of the slave owner to arrange the marriage of or among his slaves. The slave owner and his descendants also had a right to have sex with slave women owned by the household.

=== Livelihood ===
The Wolof people are traditionally settled farmers and artisans. Millet has been the typical staple, while rice a secondary staple when rains are plenty. Cassava is also grown, but it has been a source of income for the Wolof farmers. Since the colonial era, peanuts have been the primary cash crop.

Wolof society is patrilineal, and agricultural land is inherited by the landowning caste. The typical farmers in a village pay rent (waref) to the landowner for the right to crop his land. Wolof farmers raise chickens and goats, and dried or smoked fish purchased, both a part of their diet. Cattle are also raised, not for food, but milk, tilling the land, and as a reserve of wealth. Rural Wolof people eat beef rarely, typically as a part of a ceremonial feast. Some villages in contemporary times share agricultural machinery and sell the peanut harvest as a cooperative.

Those Wolof people who are of artisan castes work on metal, weave and dye textiles, produce leather goods, make pottery and baskets, tailor clothes, produce thatch and perform such economic activity. Wolof smiths produce tools for agriculture, while another group works on gold jewelry.

Occupation is traditionally based on gender and inherited caste. Men of certain caste are smiths, leatherworkers, weavers (now the profession of former slave descendants). Religious and political functions have been the domain of men, while women typically keep the household, bring water from their sources such as wells or nearby rivers. Women also plant, weed, harvest crops and collect firewood. Women of the pottery caste group, also help in steps involved in making pottery.

== Notable Wolof people ==
=== A ===
- Amadou Onana

=== D ===
- Lamine
- Gorgui Dieng
- Alassane Diop
- Cheikh Anta Diop
- DeSagana Diop
- Papa Bouba Diop
- Sofiane Diop
- Papy Djilobodji
- Yoro Dyao

=== F ===
- Baye Fall (Battling Siki)
- Maissa Bigué Ngoné Fall

=== G ===
- Idrissa Gueye

=== I ===
- Abdul Injai

=== K ===
- Anta Majigeen Ndiaye Kingsley

=== M ===
- Djibril Diop Mambéty (film director)
- Kara Mbodj
- Ndaté Yalla Mbodj
- Njembot Mbodj

=== N ===
- Alfred N'Diaye
- Cherif N'Diaye
- Ibrahim Niass

=== W ===
- Abdoulaye Wade
- Papa Waigo

== Bibliography ==
- Abdel Malek, Karine; Cissé, Mamadou (2014). Proverbes et dictons wolof (in French). Paris: Présence Africaine. ISBN 978-2-7087-0842-6.
- Cissé, Mamadou (2004). Dictionnaire français–wolof (in French). Paris: L’Asiathèque. ISBN 2-911053-43-5.
- Cissé, Mamadou (1994). Contes wolof modernes (in French). Paris: L’Harmattan. ISBN 2-7384-3016-3.
- Malherbe, Michel; Sall, Cheikh (1989). Parlons wolof – langue et culture (in French). Paris: L'Harmattan. ISBN 2-7384-0383-2.
- Bichler, Gabriele Aïscha (2003). Bejo, Curay und Bin-bim? Die Sprache und Kultur der Wolof im Senegal (mit angeschlossenem Lehrbuch Wolof). Europäische Hochschulschriften (in German). Vol. 90. Frankfurt am Main: Peter Lang Verlagsgruppe. ISBN 3-631-39815-8.
- Fal, Arame; Santos, Rosine; Doneux, Jean Léonce (1990). Dictionnaire wolof-français (suivi d'un index français–wolof) (in French). Paris: Karthala. ISBN 2-86537-233-2.
- Goetz, Rolf (1996). Senegal – Gambia: Praktischer Reiseführer an die Westküste Afrikas (in German). Frankfurt am Main: Verlag Peter Meyer Reiseführer. ISBN 3-922057-09-8.
