= Brak (title) =

Brak (or Braque) was the title of the kings of the kingdoms of Waalo (or Oualo) and Biffeche on the Senegal River in Senegal and Mauritania in West Africa until the 19th century.

The word brak possibly derive from Arabic and mean "high," or from the Arabic word baraka (divine blessing) The main Brak was the king of the Kingdom of Waalo with capital at Ndiourbel north of the river, and later at Nder on the west shore of Lac de Guiers. The 'Petit Brak' was the king or seigneur of the Kingdom of Biffeche, with his capital compound at Maka on the Senegal River, near Saint-Louis.

The kingdoms of Waalo and Biffeche were labelled as 'Brak' or 'Braque' on some French maps of the area, not to be confused with the moorish realm of Brakna north of the Senegal River. Waalo was conquered by the French in the mid-19th century.

The Braks of Waalo were chosen from three leading families of Dyoos, Teedyo and Logar, and ruled through a council consisting of various officials with specific delegated functions. It has been claimed that the Brak of Waalo ruled through a local kind of African traditional democracy, but the rulership had definite patrilineal and matrilineal hereditary restrictions. They claimed descent from the legendary first Brak of Waalo and Jolof, Ndiadiane Ndiaye.
