= Institut Fondamental d'Afrique Noire =

Senegalese research institute

IFAN (I.F.A.N., Institut fondamental d'Afrique noire or Fundamental Institute of Black Africa) is a cultural and scientific institute in the nations of the former French West Africa. Founded in Dakar, Senegal, in 1938 as the Institut français d’Afrique noire (French Institute of Black Africa), the name was changed only in 1966. It was headquartered in what is now the building of the IFAN Museum of African Arts. Since its founding, its charge was to study the language, history, and culture of the peoples ruled by French colonialism in Africa.

== Early history ==
IFAN first formed from a combination of three forces: the French colonial "civilizing mission", the desire for more efficient Indirect rule through the understanding of African cultures, and research into the resources of the French dominion in Africa. Governors General Ernest Roume (1902–1908) and William Ponty (1908–1914) oversaw a reorganization of the French higher educational system in the colonies, and placing Georges Hardy in charge, moved the colonial administration into a model that used elements from both a "Direct", Assimilationist policy and an Indirect, rule by African proxy policy. The first required educational resources be created provided for the small minority of "assimilated" Africans, while the later required French colonial administrators be educated in the workings of African societies. To these ends, Hardy oversaw the creation of the École normale supérieure William Ponty (under the administration of François Joseph Clozel), the publication Bulletin de l'Enseigement en AOF, and the Comite d'etudes historiques et scientifiques de l'AOF (1918). This last, immensely successful as a scientific journal, inaugurated what one historian has called an era of "knowledge and control".

These imperial (or at best paternalist) scientific tools were turned on their head in a number of ways. First, the African higher education system (and the École William Ponty in particular) became the incubator for the political leaders of the independence movement. The study of African cultures, though invaluable to modern historians, did little to legitimize French rule through their Chefs du Canton, but it did provide Francophone West Africans (such as Léopold Senghor) with the materials to bolster their sense of cultural importance, as demonstrated in the Negritude movement. Finally, Europeans and Africans who opposed colonial rule came together in the years after the founding of IFAN in Dakar. IFAN was first conceived as an integration of various French colonial research systems in the early 1930s, and the vision was one of putting science to the service of the colonial project. Jules Brévié, governor of French West Africa from 1930 to 1936, wrote that "colonization needs scholars, impartial and disinterested researchers with broad vision, outside of the urgency and fire of action. He wanted a methodical research program into colonial history and African culture, and lobbied for an official scientific institute to undertake geographical, ethnographic and historical research.

The Popular Front government, in 1936, converted the Comite d'etudes historiques et scientifiques de l'AOF into the Dakar-based IFAN, and placed naturalist Théodore Monod at its head. From the opening of the institute in 1938, Monod sought to promote Africans into positions of authority in IFAN, such as ethnologist Amadou Hampâté Bâ. With the end of the Second World War, an influx of African intellectuals and French radicals (such as Jean Suret-Canale) found homes in IFAN and its branches, some taking part in political agitation through organisations such as the Senegalese Popular Front, the RDA, and the Communist Study Groups of the 1940s.

As independence loomed in the 1950s, IFAN became an increasingly African institution. It formed a parallel National Archives to the Archives of the Governor General in Dakar, with Monod and the IFAN answering directly to the Minister of Overseas France – a rare degree of autonomy under the AOF system. By independence, IFAN had offices in Saint-Louis, Abidjan, Bamako, Cotonou, Niamey, Ouagadougou, associated centers in Douala and Lomé, and permanent scientific research stations in Atar, Diafarabé, and Mont-Nimba. The 1940s and '50s saw more such projects undertaken, such as the 1943 Office of Colonial Scientific Research (now the ORSTOM Soil Research Centre in Dakar-Hann) and the University of Dakar in 1957. Each of these institutions, begun as colonial instruments, evolved with the coming of independence into African tools to meet African needs.

== Independence ==
By independence in 1960 IFAN had branches across French West Africa, in all the cities which were to become the capitals of independent states. The Dakar IFAN was transferred to Cheikh Anta Diop University in 1960, and Monod was kept on as director until 1965. In 1986 it was officially renamed "IFAN Cheikh Anta Diop", and maintains budgets, administration and staff independent of the university. It is today one of the most prestigious centers for the study of African culture in the world. As the main cultural research center of the colonies of French West Africa, it contains important collections from across Francophone Africa. Most branches of IFAN, notably in Conakry (Guinea), Abidjan (Côte d'Ivoire), and Bamako (Mali), became the basis for national archives and research centers. Some still retain the "IFAN" title. The IFAN of Soudan Francais became the National Museum of Mali, while IFAN of French Guinea became the Institut National de Recherche et Documentation: the National Library, Archives and Museum of Guinea.

== Publishing ==
IFAN publishes a number of academic journals. Mémoire de l'IFAN and Bulletin de l'Institut Fondamental d'Afrique Noire (abbreviated BIFAN) mostly deal with linguistics, anthropology, history and archaeology. The Centre de Linguistique Appliquée de Dakar, in conjunction with IFAN, has published extensive work on the languages of Africa, notably the multi-volume Lexique Wolof-Français. Other sections of IFAN have published collections on everything from the fish to the dance of the West African region.
