= Alboury Ndiaye =

- Buurba
- Reign: 1875-1890
- Predecessor: Sanor Ndiaye
- Born: c. 1848; Tyal, Kingdom of Jolof
- Died: 1901; Dosso, Niger
- Issue: Mansour Bouna Alboury Ndiaye
- House: Ndiaye
- Father: Biram Penda Diémé Ndioté Ndiaye
- Mother: Seynabou Diop
- Religion: Islam

Alboury Ndiaye (also spelled Albury Njay) was the last Buurba of an independent Jolof Kingdom, and was famous for his determined resistance to the French conquest of Senegal.

== Early life ==
Alboury Ndiaye was born in about 1848, the same year that bergel (minister) Makura Niang, who had been ruling Jolof from behind the scenes for decades, died, leaving a chaotic power vacuum that lasted into the 1870s. In 1851 his father Biram Penda Diémé Ndioté Ndiaye was killed at the battle of Nguenenen, and his mother Seynabou Diop fled with him to her native Ndiambour province in Cayor. There, he was raised and trained in warfare alongside his older cousin Lat Jor. He was still a child in 1855 when France began actively expanding their colonial footprint in Senegambia.

In the 1860s he joined Lat Jor in converting to Islam under the leadership of marabout Maba Diakhou Ba. Their forces briefly occupied Jolof in 1865, forcing the reigning buurba to flee rather than convert. Alboury married one of Maba's daughters.

== Resistance leader ==
In 1870 another Islamic reformer, Shaikh Amadou Ba of the Imamate of Futa Toro, again tried to convince the buurba to convert first with letters and then with an army. Ultimately he succeeded in cowing the political leadership of the kingdom, Islamizing the state, and he settled there with his numerous followers. Having been in Cayor with Lat Jor (now Damel) at the time, Alboury became one of the leaders of the resistance. By 1873, he was the only prominent Jolof prince who had yet to make his peace with Amadou.

As Amadou was preoccupied with conflict in Futa Toro, Alboury raided in Jolof and attempted to foment discontent. In May 1874 a major rebellion broke out in Jolof but was put down with difficulty. An alliance of Alboury, Lat Jor, and two Futanke chieftains fought a major battle with Amadou at Coki but were defeated and scattered. The marabout's rising power alarmed the French, who joined the alliance. Amadou Ba was then defeated and killed in the battle of Samba Sadio on February 11, 1875. Alboury Ndiaye then became buurba in all but name, with an elder uncle as a figurehead.

== Rule as Buurba ==
Ndiaye re-established firm royal control in Jolof, ended the frequent raiding, promoted trade and agricultural production, and continued the Islamization of the country. Where previous ceddo (animist) rulers had seen Islam as a threat, Alboury embraced it. He also fortified the capital at Yang-Yang with a tata. When Amadou Ba's cousin Bara Ba tried to retake Jolof in September 1875, his army was unable to penetrate the fortifications and Alboury drove them off. He returned in 1881 along with a rival claimant to the throne of Jolof, but Alboury and Lat Jor defeated and killed them at the battle of Jame Njay.

He supported his cousin Lat Jor in a dispute with the French over the construction of a railroad, and helped him raid into Waalo and Cayor after the French had deposed him. In the resulting conflicts several allies of Alboury defected, and he installed a new figurehead buurba. A French commercial blockade of Jolof brought about a famine, temporarily resolved by a treaty in April 1885.

In 1886 the new French-backed Damel of Cayor invaded Jolof, but Alboury soundly defeated him at the battle of Gile. The French bribed him to prevent him taking all of Cayor in the aftermath. In 1887 he attempted to use his significant resources to support allies in Rip and the Kingdom of Sine, but their French-backed opponents were victorious. By 1890 Jolof was the only remaining independent kingdom in northern Senegambia.

In the face of seemingly unstoppable French encroachment, Alboury Ndiaye established diplomatic relations with Ahmadu Tall of the Segou Empire (the successor of El-Hajj Oumar Tall) and made plans to evacuate much of the population eastwards. To prevent this, a column led by Alfred Dodds marched on Yang-Yang in May 1890, and Ndiaye moved eastwards across the Ferlo Desert to Futa Toro. Dodds installed a puppet buurba and officially established a protectorate over Jolof, ending its independence.

== Journey to the East ==
Abdul Bokar Kan hosted Ndiaye and his troops in Futa Toro for a time as he tried to gather his forces, but in July the French shelled the town of Kaedi in a bid to force him out. Most of the Jolof-Jolof wanted to return home, and the other Futanke chiefs were worried about further French reprisals. With around 40 followers and his family, Alboury went to Nioro du Sahel to join Ahmadu, arriving in October 1890. There he led Ahmadu's army against the French in battle on January 3, 1891, holding them off long enough for the caliph to escape. Alboury attempted to lead a group of Senegalese emigrants back to their homeland but they were intercepted by Dodds before they could cross the Senegal river. He rejoined Ahmadu and they moved east with a small band, trying to re-establish themselves before the French caught up. He ultimately was killed in battle against the French in Dosso, Niger in 1901.

== Legacy ==
Alboury Ndiaye's son Bouna Alboury Ndiaye was captured by the French and later became titural buurba of Jolof as well as a prominent religious and political leader in Senegal. The home stadium of ASEC Ndiambour in the city of Louga is known as Stade Alboury Ndiaye.
