= Battle of Samba Sadio =

- Part of the French colonial wars
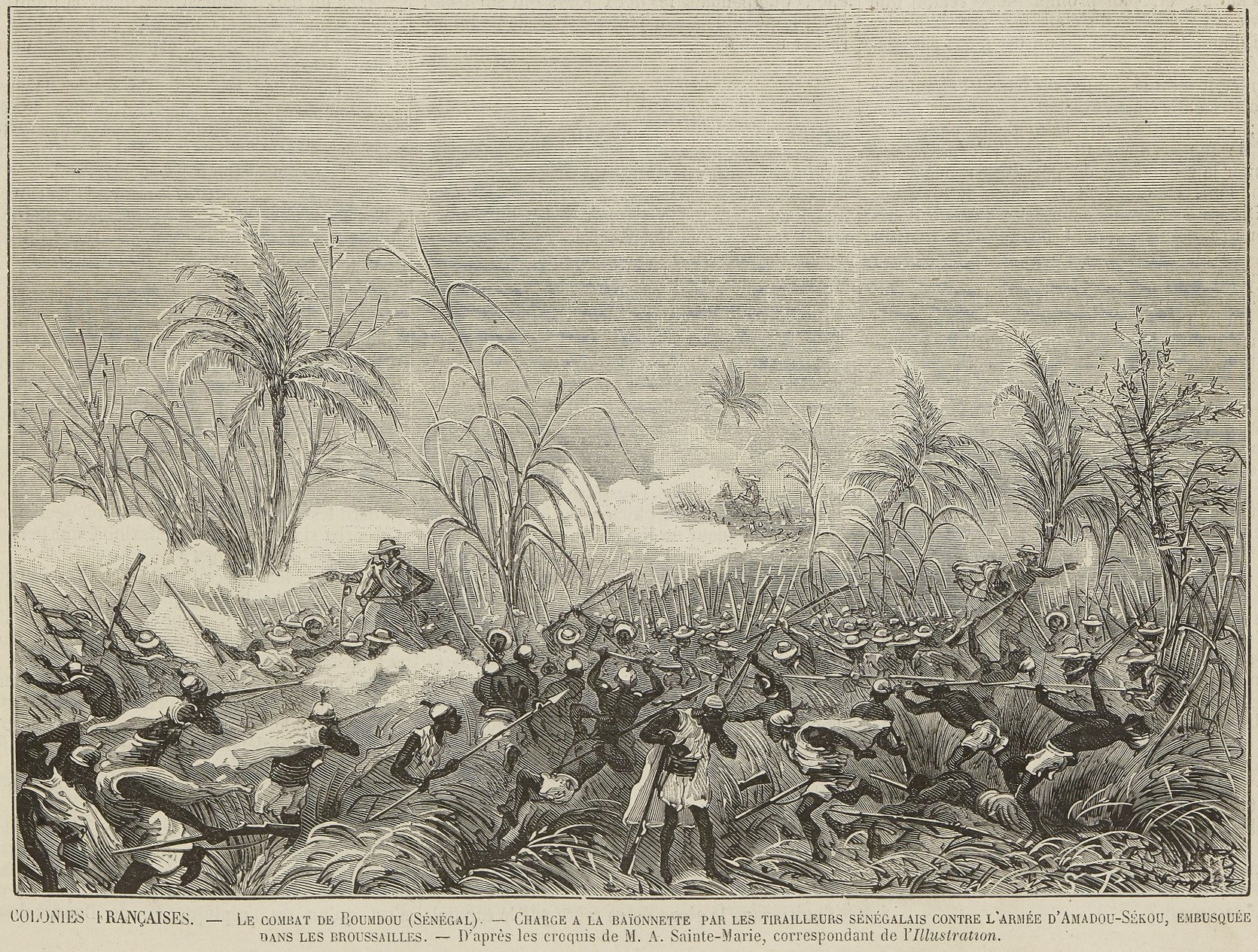
- Bayonet charge by Senegalese riflemen against Amadou-Sekou's army, ambushed in the brush (L'Illustration magazine, 1875)
Date	11 February 1875
Location	Samba Sadio, near Koki, Louga region, present day Senegal
Result	French victory

Belligerents
Cayor; Jolof (French Third Republic) French Republic	Tijani

Commanders and leaders
Lat Jor; Lieutenant-Colonel Charles Auguste Frédéric Bégin	Shaikh Amadou Ba

Strength
? French contingent: 520-560 soldiers 2 cannons	?

Casualties and losses
14 killed 88 wounded	about 500 killed

The battle of Samba Sadio was fought on 11 February 1875 near Samba Sadio in Senegal's Louga region as a final battle of the campaign against religious radical and tribesman leader Shaikh Amadou Ba. Joined forces of Cayor and Jolof troops led by Lat Jor and supported by the French African Army contingent decisively defeated Shaikh Amadou's Tijani forces and Amadou himself was killed during the clash, which ment the end of his seven years lasting military conquests.

== Prelude ==
Shaikh Amadou Ba, self-proclaimed the Mahdi (Islamic prophet) became his movement after a cholera epidemic broke out in Senegambia. Although his alliance with Lat Jor, Damel of Cayor, and their joined victory over the French in the battle of Mekhe on 8 July 1869, this alliance broke shortly after. In following years he focused on his military operations and converting missions in Futa Tooro region, placed along the Senegal river. July 1874 Amadou Ba invaded Cayor and his forces were able to win several battles against the men of Lat Jor and also the exiled Jolof prince Alboury Ndiaye. French colonial administrative in Senegal then decided to support the authority of officially recognized Damel Lat Jor and sent a contingent under the command of Col.-Lt. Charles Bégin to join the Jor's forces.

== Battle ==
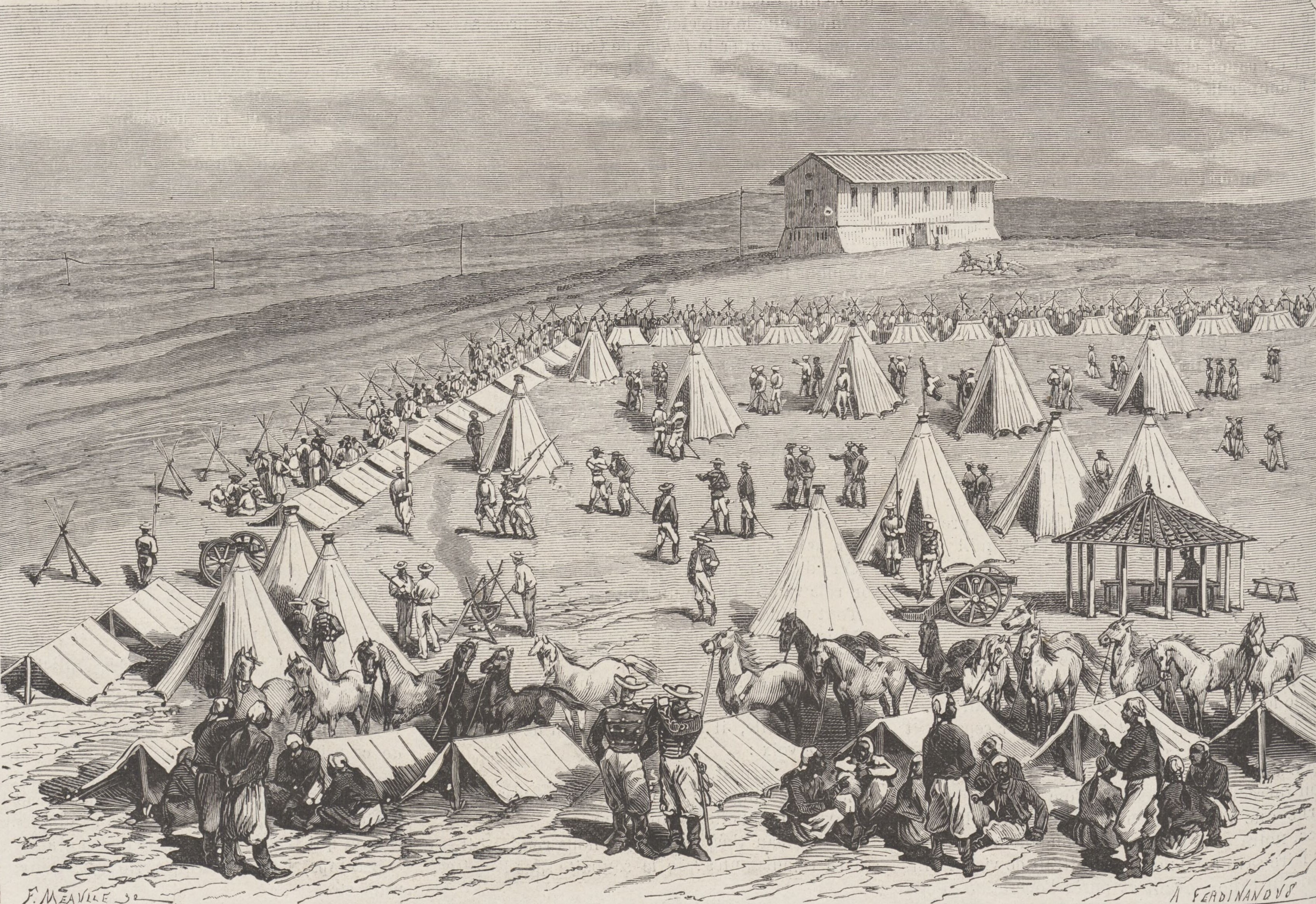
French camp at Mouit on their way to Senegalese inlands (etching by A. Ferdinandus, Le Monde illustré magazine)

A French column, approximately 520-560 strong, composed of marine infantry, Senegalese riflemen and spahis, and an artillery detachment of two mountain cannons, left the city of Saint-Louis on 6 February. In the encampment at Mouit were French accompanied with Lat Jor and his army of 2,500 men and then started their march in the direction of Coki. On the morning of 11 February, the scouts arrived to report the enemy's presence and their preparations for a fierce attack. The troops had to line themselves to a square battle formation rapidly, while the attack of Amadou Ba's forces began. The Tijani, protected by undergrowth, were able to crawl through the grass and came within thirty paces of the French battle square. Both sides commenced fire from a close distance. Covered by the fire of their two mountain cannons, Lieutenant-Colonel Bégin ordered the Senegalese riflemen and a squadron of spahi to attack. Defending Lot Jor's troops joined the action and pursued the enemy. Shortly after the battle, fortified village of Koki, base of Amadou Ba, was captured without any resistance.

Losses on the side of Tijani insurgents were estimated of about 500 killed. Amadou Ba, along with many members of his family, were among them, although his body was never found. Bégin's French contingent marked 14 soldiers killed (including one officer) and 88 wounded.

== Aftermath ==
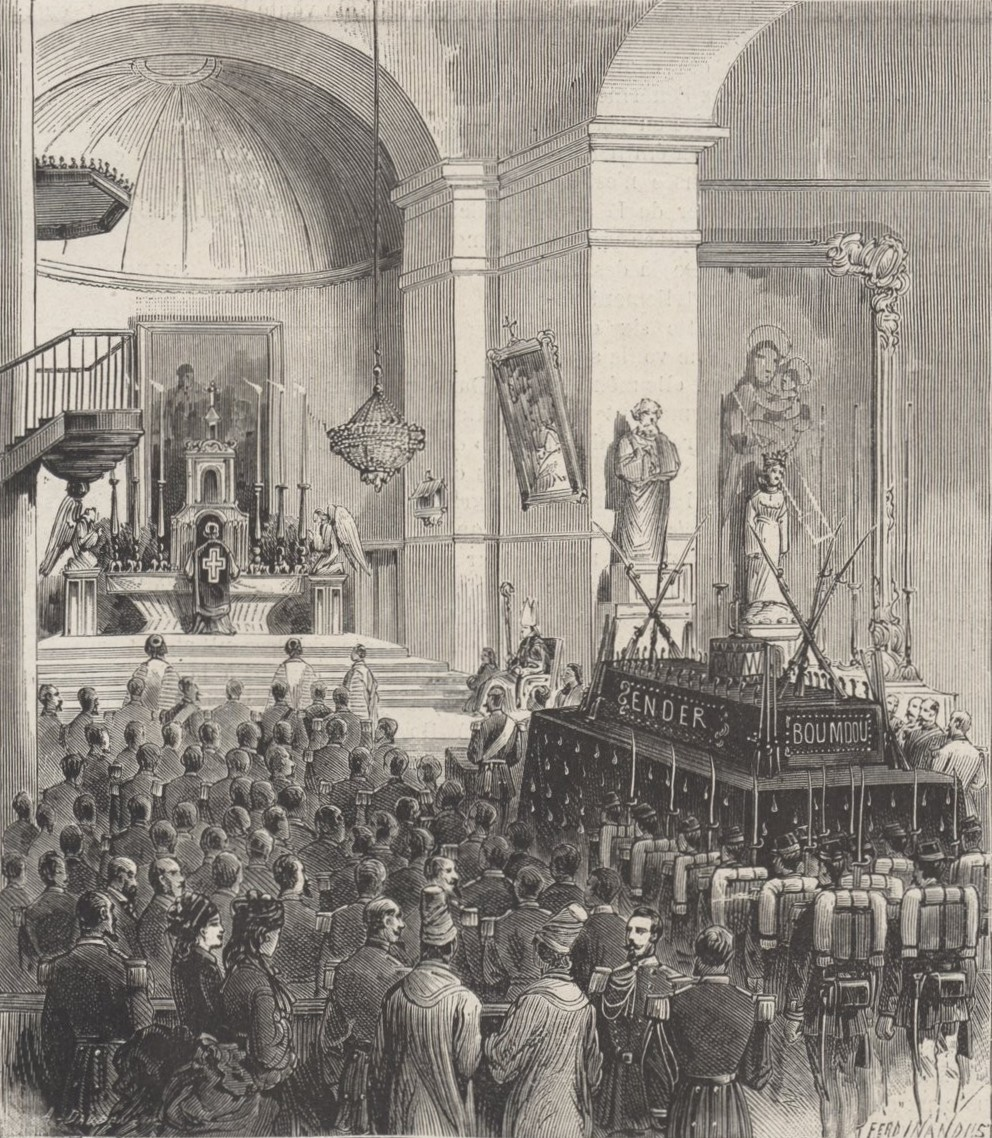
Religious service for the victims of the expedition in Saint-Louis (February 1875)

Clash brought the final end of Amadou Ba's expansionist raids and helped to secure the position of Lat Jor as ruler of Cayor. Shortly after the battle Lat Jor had to deal with a revolt among the jaami buur, or royal slaves. As French colonial expansion in Senegal continued under a new governor Louis Brière de l'Isle from 1876 to 1881, the Franco-Adjor alliance finally broke down in 1883 when Lat Jor began a rebellion to resist the construction of the Dakar to Saint-Louis railway.

== See also ==
- Shaikh Amadou Ba
- Lat Jor
- French conquest of Senegal

== Bibliography ==
- Barry, Boubacar (1998). Senegambia and the Atlantic slave trade. Cambridge, UK: Cambridge University Press.
- Charles, Eunice A. (1977). Precolonial Senegal : the Jolof Kingdom, 1800-1890. Brookline, MA: African Studies Center, Boston University.
