= Yang Yang =

Yang Yang may refer to:

== Arts and entertainment ==
- Yang Yang (actor) (born 1991), Chinese actor
- Yang Yang (conductor) (born 1973), Chinese conductor and artistic director
- Yang Yang (painter) (born 1953), Chinese-born American artist and sculptor
- Yang Yang (tenor) (1974/75–2019), Chinese operatic tenor
- Bian Jinyang (born 1993), Chinese author who writes under the pen name Yang Yang
- Liu Yangyang (born 2000), member of China based band WayV

== Sportspeople ==
- Yang Yang (badminton) (born 1963), Chinese badminton player
- Yang Yang (baseball) (born 1986), Chinese baseball player
- Yang Yang (speed skater, born 1976), Chinese speed skater, Olympic gold medalist
- Yang Yang (speed skater, born 1977), Chinese speed skater, Olympic silver medalist
- Yang Yang (sprinter) (born 1991), Chinese sprinter
- Yang Yang (swimmer) (born 1997), Chinese Paralympic swimmer
- Yang Yang (weightlifter) (born 2002), Chinese weightlifter

== Other uses ==
- Prince Yangyang (born Wang Seo), Goryeo-prince who became the ancestors of King Gongyang
- Yangyang, a character in Wuthering Waves
- Yang Yang (scientist) (born 1958), Taiwanese-born materials scientist at University of California, Los Angeles
- "Yang Yang" (song), a 1972 song by Yoko Ono
- Yang-Yang, Senegal
- Yang-Yang Arrondissement, Senegal

=== Pandas ===
- Yang Yang (Atlanta giant panda) (male, born 1997), his name means "little sea"
- Yang Yang (Vienna giant panda) (female, born 2000), or "Sunshine", at the Vienna Zoo

== See also ==
- Ying Yang Twins, an Atlanta-based American crunk rap duo
- Yangyang County, South Korea
- Yangyang International Airport, South Korea
- Yangyang Monastery, Sikkim, India
