= Yang Yan =

Yang Yan is the name of:

- Yang Yan (empress) (238–274), first wife of Emperor Wu of Jin
- Yang Yan (Tang dynasty) (727–781), politician of the Tang dynasty
- Yang Yan (wheelchair basketball) (born 1998), Chinese wheelchair basketball player

== See also ==
- Yang Yang (disambiguation)
