= Koki, Senegal =

Town in Senegal

Coordinates: 15°30′00″N 15°59′00″W

Koki, also spelled Coki, is a town and commune in Senegal, the capital of an eponymous arrondissement in the Louga Region.

== History ==
Koki was founded by the marabout Matar Ndoumbé Diop in the Ndiambour province of the Wolof Kingdom of Cayor in the early 18th century. The Damel Maisa Tenda Wej gave him the estate.

The site of Diop's Islamic university, it quickly became one of the most important centers of learning in the region as well as a center of anti-royalist political activity. A marabout uprising and a subsequent invasion from Futa Toro led by Abdul Kader Kan were crushed in 1790 by the Damel. Ndiaga Isseu Dièye Diop, Serin Koki in the 1820s, led another abortive rebellion against the Damel but was forced to flee to Waalo.

In 1862 Lat Jor's supporters defeat his rival for the throne of Cayor, Madiodio, in battle at Koki. In 1875 Lat Jor and Alboury Ndiaye defeated and killed Shaikh Amadu Ba at the battle of Samba Sajo near Koki.

In 1939 Ahmadou Sakhir Lô founded an Islamic institute known as the Coki Daara. It is today the largest in Senegal, and features on the list of national historical monuments.

== Notable people ==
=== Studied ===
- Abdul Kader Kan, first Almamy of the Imamate of Futa Toro
- Saxewar Fatma Jop, grandfather of Lat Jor

=== Born ===
- Mbaye Diagne, a Senegalese Military Officer and United Nations Military Observer who was credited with saving many lives during the Rwandan genocide.
- Madieng Khary Dieng, a former government minister under Abdou Diouf
- Sayerr Jobe, founder of Serrekunda

== See also ==
- Lat Jor
- Cayor
