= Ceddo =

Senegalese class of warrior-slaves

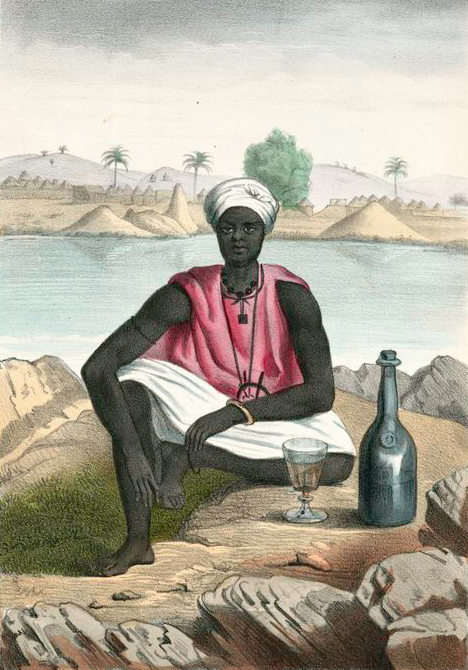
1853 image of a ceddo warrior, with a bottle of palm wine

The Ceddo, also spelled Cedo, Tieddo, or Tyeddo, were a class of warrior-slaves in pre-colonial Senegalese societies, particularly Jolof, Cayor, Baol and Waalo. Up until the mid 19th century, they were a powerful political and social group closely aligned with the traditional monarchs of the region against the rise of Islam and colonialism. In modern-day Senegal the word retains negative connotations, and can describe the societies in which the ceddo operated or the followers of traditional African religions generally.

== Etymology ==
'Ceddo' is a Fula word for either the Wolof people or the Mandinka, depending on the dialect. It is unknown how it came to be applied to animists generally.

== History and Role in Society ==
The late 17th and 18th centuries saw repeated rebellions by marabouts attempting to overthrow the partially Islamized kingdoms of Senegambia and replace them with Islamic theocracies. This period created a sharp divide in the ruling classes between the Muslims on one side and the ceddo on the other, whereas beforehand syncretic Islam had been generally practiced.

The ceddo were a class apart who enjoyed significant prestige as warriors and lived the life of noblemen. They could marry noble as them, but would not give their daughters in marriage to commoners, and some freemen chose to become ceddos. They acted as the police, tax collectors, warriors, and the monarch's bodyguard.

Fiercely opposed to the strict practice of Islam, they were renowned drinkers and brave fighters. They raided freely, including within their own kingdoms, for booty and slaves. Their depredations helped create unrest and ultimately promote Islam among the population, and suppressed food production. The ceddo were powerful into the late 19th century, when a generation of secular monarchs including Lat Dior and Alboury Ndiaye formally converted to Islam in an effort to build an alliance between the secular traditionalists and the Muslims to resist French colonial encroachment. Their promotion of the marabout interpretation of Islam, combined with their eventual failure on the battlefield, brought the Wolof population fully towards Islam.

== Notable Ceddo ==
- Lat Sukaabe Fall
- Lat Dior
- Alboury Ndiaye
