= Imamate of Futa Toro =

West African state (1776–1861)

- 1776–1859
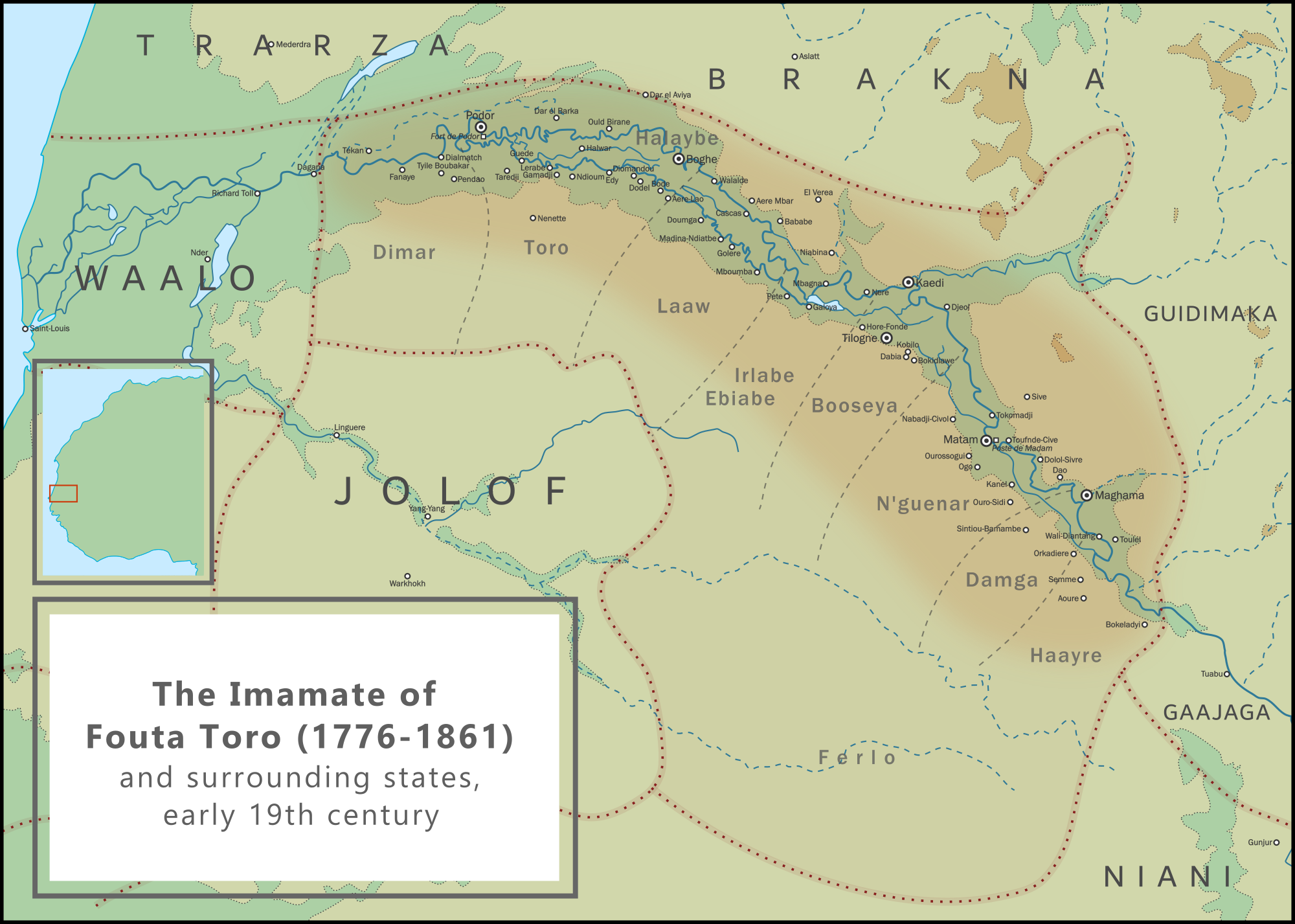
- Capital: Orefonde
- Common languages: Arabic (official); Pulaar language
- Religion: Sunni Islam
- Government: Theocratic monarchy
- Almamy
  - 1776–1804: Abdul Kader
  - 1875–1891: Abdul Ba Bakar
- History
  - Established: 1776
  - Incorporated into Senegal Colony: 1877
  - Disestablished: 1859
Preceded by	Succeeded by
Empire of Great Fulo	Tukulor Empire; French West Africa
- Today part of: Senegal

The Imamate of Futa Toro (Arabic: إمامة فوتة تورو; Fula: Imaama Futa Toro; French: Imamat de Futa Toro) was a West African theocratic monarchy of the Fula-speaking people (Fulɓe and Toucouleurs) in the middle valley of the Senegal River, in the region known as Futa Toro. Following the trend of jihads in the late 17th century and early 18th century, the religious leader Sulayman Bal led a jihad in 1776. His successor, the expansionist Abdul Kader defeated the emirates of Trarza and Brakna and by his death in 1806, power became decentralized between a few elite families of Torodbe. Threatened by both the expansion of the Toucouleur Empire and the French in the mid-19th century, Futa Toro was eventually annexed in 1859. By the 1860s, the power of the Almamy became nominal and the state was further weakened when a cholera epidemic killed a quarter of its population in 1868.

== Origins ==
Futa Toro is a strip of agricultural land along both sides of the Senegal River. (Note: The word Futa was a general name the Fulbe gave to any area they lived in, while Toro was the actual identity of the region for its inhabitants.) The people of the region speak Pulaar, a dialect of the greater Fula languages spanning West Africa from Senegal to Cameroon. They identify themselves by the language, which gives rise to the name Haalpulaar'en (those who speak Pulaar). The Haalpulaar'en are also known as Toucouleur people, a name derived from the ancient state of Takrur. From 1495 to 1776, the country was part of the Denanke Kingdom. The Denianke leaders were a clan of non-Muslim Fulbe who ruled over most of Senegal.

A class of Muslim scholars called the Torodbe (Note: The name "Torodbe" comes from the verb tooraade, meaning to beg for alms in reference to the Qur'anic school pupils who supported themselves in that way. The label of begging was likely applied by the Denanke court who made fun of the Muslim underclass.) seem to have originated in Futa Toro, later spreading throughout the Fulbe territories. Two of the Torodbe clans in Futa Toro claimed to be descended from a seventh-century relative of one of the companions of Muhammad who was among a group of invaders of Futa Toro. The Torodbe may well have already been a distinct group when the Denianke conquered Futa Toro.

In the last quarter of the 17th century the Mauritanian Zawāyā reformer Nasir al-Din launched a jihad to restore purity of religious observance in the Futa Toro. He gained support from the Torodbe clerical clan against the warriors, but by 1677 the movement had been defeated. After this defeat, some of the Torodbe migrated south to Bundu and some continued on to the Futa Jallon. The farmers of Futa Toro continued to suffer from attacks by nomads from Mauritania. By the 18th century there was growing resentment among the largely Muslim lower class at a lack of protection from Denianke rulers against these attacks.

== Jihad ==
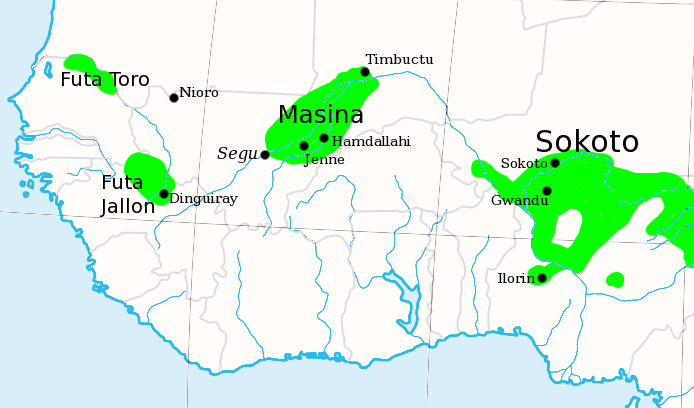
The Fulani Jihad States of West Africa, c. 1830

In 1726 or 1727 Karamokho Alfa led a jihad in Futa Jallon to the south, leading to formation of the Almamyate of Futa Jallon. This was followed by a jihad in Futa Toro between 1769 and 1776 led by Sulayman Bal. In 1776 the Torodbe overthrew the ruling Denianke Dynasty. Sulayman died in 1776 and was succeeded by Abdul Kader ('Abd al-Qadir), a learned teacher and judge who had studied in Cayor.

Abdul Kader became the first Almamy (Note: Almami is derived from the Arabic al-Imam, meaning the one who leads in prayer.) of the theocratic Almamyate of Futa Toro. He encouraged construction of mosques, and pursued an aggressive policy towards his neighbors. The Torodbe prohibited the trade in slaves on the river. In 1785 they obtained an agreement from the French to stop trading in Muslim slaves and to pay customs duties to the state. Abdul Kader defeated the emirates of Trarza and Brakna to the north, but was defeated and captured when he attacked the Wolof states of Cayor and Waalo around 1797. After his release the jihad impetus had been lost. By the time of Abdul Kader's death in 1806 the state was dominated by a few elite Torodbe families.

== Government ==
The Almamyate was ruled by an Almamy elected, from a group of eligible lineages, by an electoral council, which contained a fixed core and a fluctuating periphery of members. Multiple figures from 4 different clans took up the title of Almamy (Ly, Dia, Kane, and Wane). Almamys continued to be enthroned in Futa Toro throughout the 20th century, but by then the role had become ceremonial.

The kingdom was ruled officially by the Almamy, but effective control lay with regional chiefs of the central provinces who possessed considerable land, followers and slaves. The struggle of various coalitions of electors and eligibles further hastened the decline of the Almamyate. In the middle of the 19th century, the Futa Toro was threatened by the French under the leadership of Governor Louis Faidherbe. The Almamyate at this time was divided into three parts. The Central region contained the seat of the elected Almamy, subject to a council of 18 electors. The west, called the Toro region, was administered by the Lam-Toro. The east, called the Futa Damga was theoretically administered by a chief called El-Feki, but in practice he had only nominal authority. The Almamyate survived through the 20th century, albeit in a much weaker state.

== Collapse ==
In 1828 Hamme Ba launched a revolt in Futa Toro, however it was suppressed. Omar Saidou Tall, a native of Toro who had left for Mecca in 1827, returned in 1846 to build support for a new jihad. He launched his jihad in 1852, and his forces succeeded in establishing several states in the Western Sudan to the east of Futa Toro, however the French under Louis Faidherbe prevented him from incorporating Futa Toro into his empire.

To achieve his goals, Omar recruited heavily in Senegambia, especially in his native land. The recruitment process reached its culmination in a massive drive in 1858 and 1859. It had the effect of undermining the power of the Almamy even more. The authority of the regional chiefs, and particularly that of the electors, was compromised much less than that of the Almamy. Some of these leaders became fully independent and fought off the French and Omar Tall on their own. As a result, the Almamy and the chiefs began to rely increasingly on French support. Omar was defeated by the French at Medine in 1857, losing access to Futa Toro.

Futa Toro was annexed by France in 1859, although in practice it had long been within the French sphere of influence. In 1860 Omar concluded a treaty with the French in which he recognized their supremacy in Futa Toro, while he was recognized in Kaarta and Ségou. In the 1860s the Almamy of Futa Toro was Abdul Boubakar, (Note: There is some confusion between Abdul Bubakar of the Imamate of Futa Jallon and Abdul Bubaker of Futa Toro. According to Charles Augustus Ludwig Reichardt, in the introduction to his 1879 Fula language grammar, the entire country between the upper Niger River and the Senegal River was occupied by Fula people. He placed the seat of government at Timbo [in Futa Jallon], saying that Futa Jallon had spread towards the Senegal River until it met the Sisibo Fula [in Futa Toro]. They had set up a joint system of government, with two Imams named Omar and Ibrahim, also called kings. Timbo was still the capital. Another source says the two Almamys, in 1876, were absolutely unknown to each other. They were Ibrahim-Sawri in Futa Djallon and Abd-ul-Bubakar in the Senegal Futa [Futa Toro]. The regnal title Almamy was a corruption of "el-Imam" and the governors were subordinate to the Almamy) but his power was only nominal. In June 1864 the Moors and the Booseya group of Fula collaborated in plundering trade barges that had become stranded near Saldé in the east, drawing savage French reprisals against both groups.

In 1868 a cholera epidemic struck the region, killing around a quarter of the population of Futa Toro. The devastation prompted a religious revival led by Shaikh Amadu Ba, which threatened the power of the traditional aristocracy. The French supported the authorities in cracking down, and the shaikh's talibes attacked any French shipping that ventured past Podor. In 1870 a French expedition pushed Amadu Ba's forces first into central Futa and then into the Kingdom of Jolof.

The French generally encouraged strongmen such as Abdul Bokar Kan of Bossea, Ibra Wane of Law and Samba Umahani in Toro when they attacked caravans in the region, since they hoped that it would discourage migration away from the region to Omar's new state. Fear of continuing Muslim migration, however, led the military authorities to attack France's remaining clients in 1890. Abdul Bokar Kan fled but was murdered in August 1891 by the Berbers of Mauritania. The French consolidated their complete control of the region.

== See also ==
- Denanke Kingdom
- Toucouleur Empire
- List of Rulers of Futa Toro
