= Jolof =

Jolof (French: Djolof or Diolof) may refer to either of

- Jolof Empire, a West African successor state to the Mali Empire in modern Senegal from the 14th to 16th centuries
- Kingdom of Jolof, a rump survival of the earlier empire from the 16th to the 19th centuries

== See also ==
- Jollof rice
