= Emirate of Brakna =

An Arab triba pre-colonial state in Mauritania

- 1674–1903
- Status: Vassals the Alawi Sultanate (1678–1681)
- Capital: Tiris
- Official languages: Arabic
- Common languages: Hassaniya, Zenaga, Fula
- Religion: Islam
- Government: Hereditary tribal Monarchy
- Emir
  - 1674-1681: Naghmash ibn 'Mhammad
  - 1858-1903: Ahmadou wald A'l
- History
  - Established: 1674
  - Disestablished: 1903
Preceded by	Succeeded by
Bani Hassan	French West Africa

The Emirate of Brakna was a pre-colonial state in what is today southern Mauritania. Its name is shared with the modern Region of Brakna.

== Origin ==
Awlad Abdullah, mainly known as al-Brakna, were a clan of the Beni Hassan, which are one of the four sub-tribes of Beni Maqil. Their great ancestor is Barkni ibn Haddaj ibn Imran ibn Uthman ibn Maghfar ibn Awdi ibn Hassan. As the Banu Maqil migrated to Maghreb in the 11th century, its sub-tribes and clans scattred all around modern-day southern Morocco and Algeria, before gradually extending toward the coast region and south of the Sahara (modern-day Mauritania). Brakna contain many clans, including:

- Awlad Naghmash
- Awlad A'al
  - Awlad B'kar
- Awlad al-Sayyid
- Awlad Mansour
- Awlad Ahmad ibn Abd al-Jabbar

== History ==
Brakna Emirate was established in the second half of the 17th century, c. 1674, after the Awlad Abdulla took independence from the rest of Beni Hassan. Naghmash ibn Amhammad ibn Abdullah is considred as the emirates first emir and establisher as an independent political state.

One of the most renowned emirs of Brakna was emir Bakkar ouled A'le, also known as "Bakkar al-Ghoul", who partnered with his cousin Naghmash ibn Amhammad ibn Abdullah in establishing the Emirate. Bakkar was a prominent leader in the Char Bouba War, where the Brakna and Trarza allied to face the forces of Nasr ad-Din and defeated the Zawaya tribal alliance, thereby consolidating the rule of the Awlad Abdullah and Trarza, and giving both tribes control over the Gum arabic trade. When Sultan Ismail ibn Sharif invaded the Souss region in 1678, Bakkar ibn A'le arrived as part of a delegation to pledge allegiance; he presented his daughter, Khnata, to the Sultan, who married her and fathered a son with her, Abdullah ibn Ismail. This means that Bakkar ibn A'le is an ancestor of the current members of the Alawi dynasty.

During the reign of Amhammad ibn Hayba ibn Naghmash, the Brakna invaded the Trarza in 1719. Their emir, Ali Shanzhura, sought refuge with the Sultan of Morocco, Ismail ibn Sharif, and pledged allegiance to him in exchange for an army to liberate his emirate. The Sultan dispatched a force comprising two clans of the Banu Hassan, from the descendants of Rmith ibn Maghfar, namely the Labidat and the Arhahla; however, Ali Shanzhura was killed during the war to reclaim his emirate. Later, during the reign of Ahmed ibn Hayba, the Brakna drove the Awlad M'barak out to the Hodh region and besieged the Idawish for three months at Dhahr Tagant, eventually agreeing to a truce and lifting the siege in exchange for 40 horses paid by the Idawish. During the reign of Amhammed ibn al-Mukhtar ibn Aaghrishi, the Brakna allied with Abdul Kader during his revolution that established the Imamate of Futa Toro.

Towards the end of the 19th century, the Emirate faced direct confrontations and political pressure from French colonial forces. Ultimately, in December 1903, Emir Ahmadu Ould Aala signed a treaty accepting a French protectorate over the territory of the Brakna Emirate and the appointment of a French resident to oversee political, security, and customs affairs; this effectively ended the Emirate's independent sovereignty and transformed it into an administrative district within the colony of French West Africa.

== List of Emirs ==
=== Awlad Naghmash (1674-1761) ===
- Naghmash ibn Amhammad ibn Abdullah (1674-1681)
- Haybah ibn Naghmash (1681-??)
- Amhammad I ibn Haybah (??-1728)
- Ahmad ibn Haybah (1728-1761)

=== Awlad al-Sayyid (1761-??) ===
- al-Mukhtar ibn Aaghrishi (1761-1766)
- Amhammad II ibn al-Mukhtar (1766-??)

=== Awlad Naghmash (??-1780) ===
- Amhammad III ibn Ahmad ibn Haybah (??-1780)

=== Awlad A'le (1780-1903) ===
- Ahmadou I ibn Sidi B'kar (1780-1851)
- Amhammad IV oualad Muhammad oualad "Sidi Amhamelsidi" (1851-1858)
- Ahmadou II oualad A'le (1858-1903)
