= Char Bouba war =

War in west Africa, 1674-77

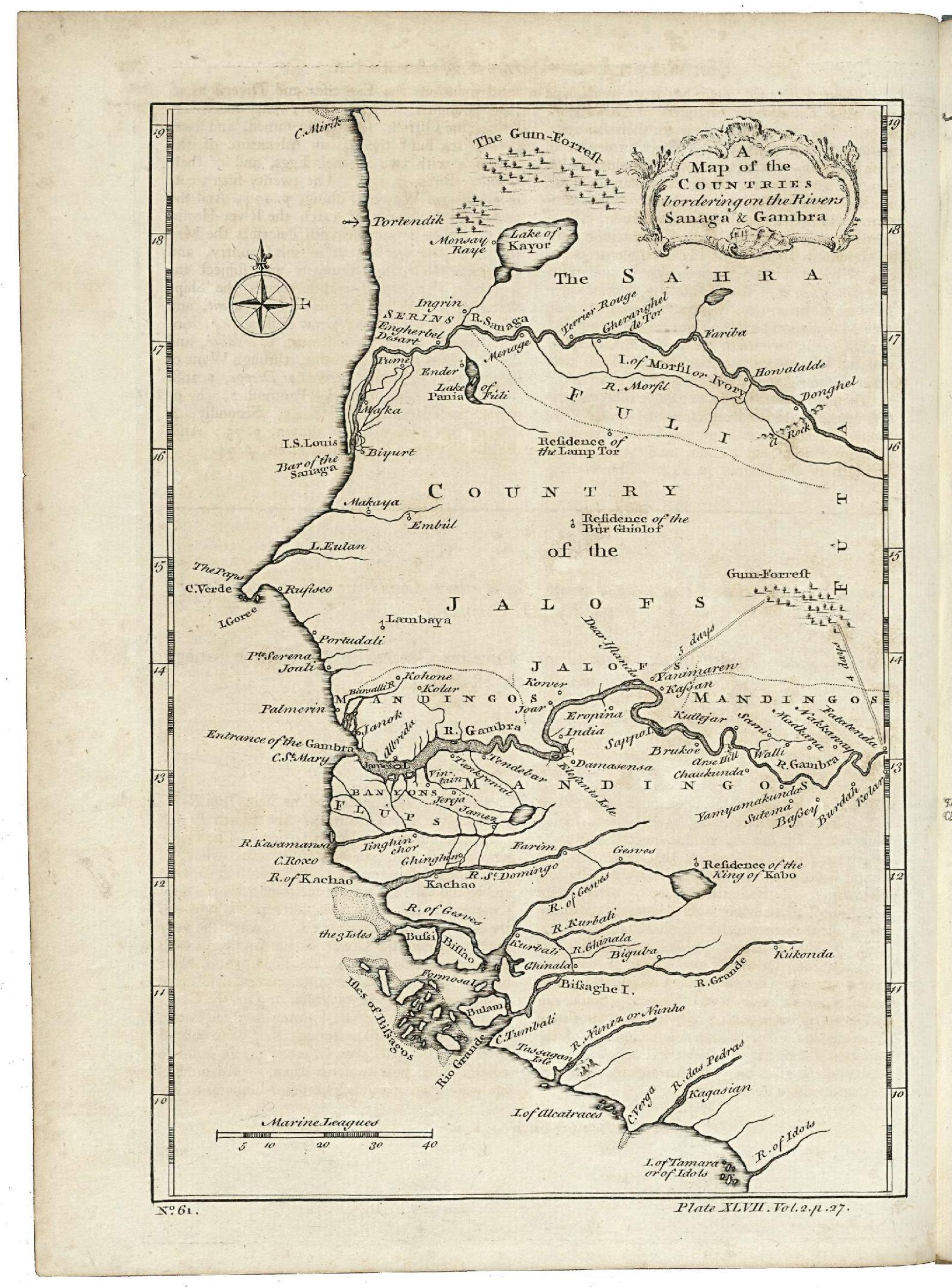
- Map of Senegambia
Date	1673-78
Location	Present-day Mauritania and Senegal
Result	Victory of the Beni Hassan and the Wolof aristocracy; Restoration of the slave trade; Institutionalization of Hassan and ceddo power; Repression or exile of Muslims south of the Senegal

Belligerents
Sanhadja Berber tribes; Torodbe; Wolof Muslims	Beni Hassan (Banu Maghfar); Trarza; Brakna; Denianke Dynasty; Traditional aristocracy of Waalo, Cayor, and Jolof; France

Commanders and leaders
Nasr ad-Din †; Uthman †; Munir ad-Din † al-Mukhtar Agd 'Abdullah †; Suranko †; Ndiaye Sall	Haddi b. Ahmad b. Daman; Bakkar b. 'Ali al-Brakni; Yerim Koode †; Fara Penda; Sire Sawa Laamu; N. Des Muchins

The Char Bouba or the Marabout War took place between 1673 and 1678 in what is today Mauritania and Senegal. It was fought between two coalitions: one of Muslim groups led by marabouts and another of secular traditional rulers and lax Muslims. The former was led by the Lamtuna Imam Nasr ad-Din and included Sanhadja tribes, the Torodbe of Futa Toro, and the Muslims of the Wolof kingdoms of Waalo, Cayor, and Jolof. The latter brought together the Arab Banu Maghfar tribes, the Denianke of Futa Toro and the traditional aristocracies of the Wolof states, supported by the French.

While the marabout coalition was initially successful, overrunning many kingdoms of the Senegal River valley, after Nasr al-Din's death it lost steam and was eventually destroyed. The war had profound long-term consequences on the social and religious makeup of Mauritania and Senegambia. Despite the failure, the jihad and its survivors inspired a long series of religious wars across West Africa that would ultimately culminate in the Sokoto jihad and the Toucouleur Empire in the 19th century.

== Name ==
Nasr al-Din's jihad is commonly known as the Char Bouba (variously transliterated as Sharr Bubba or Shurbuba), meaning 'Bouba's war', among Berber written sources. This name comes from an episode when the Muslim forces first demanded the zakat from Banu Maghfar tributaries, and a man named Bouba called for their help to resist this imposition. Char Bouba is most commonly used when studying the conflict from the Mauritanian perspective, whereas 'Marabout War' is more common in Senegal.

Contemporary European sources called it the Toubenan movement, meaning 'the penitents' in Wolof. The term Mauritanian Thirty Years' War is commonly used as well. This term, however, is derived from the work of the colonial-era French soldier and writer Paul Marty, who incorrectly believed that the conflict began in the 1640s. The 30-year timeframe is likely a poetic embellishment found in hagiographies of Nasr al-Din, or reflects the duration of the religious movement overall. The actual conflict, however, lasted only from 1673 to 1677 or shortly thereafter.

== Background and causes ==
=== In the desert ===
The Sanhaja Berber tribal confederation had played a key role in the formation of the Almoravid dynasty, and as a result had experienced a period of strength and power. Following its defeat and disintegration, the Sanhaja were left divided and weak. The more aggressive and warlike of the clans dominated the smaller and weaker groups, demanding tribute. Having failed to preserve their independence, many weaker groups turned away from violence and instead devoted themselves to Islamic learning and piety. These groups became known as the Zawaya, or Maraboutic tribes. A relationship then formed between stronger warrior clans, who cared little for Islam, and the pious Zawaya.

Arab nomads known as the Banu Maghfar (part of the larger Beni Hassan coalition) arrived in the south-western Saharan region in the 15th century. Militarily powerful, they became key players in the political scene in the desert, extorting payment from Zawaya tribes in return for protection. Often, however, they were not able to deliver on their promises, as the powerful states of the Senegal River valley, especially the Denianke kingdom, frequently raided northwards and even brought the Lamtuna under their control. The Hassan and some of the more warlike Berber tribes were themselves often guilty of raiding and pillaging caravans, and so were seen as legitimate targets for jihad, even though they remained nominally Muslim.

Tensions may have been exacerbated by an economic crisis brought on by the 1659 establishment of the French trading post at Saint-Louis, at the mouth of the Senegal River. According to a thesis first put forward by Boubacar Barry, the Europeans were competing with the nomads for both slave labour and the cereals grown in the river valley, which underpinned much of the desert economy. Without easy access to these critical resources, Moor society entered a profound crisis. Other historians point out that the Saharan caravan trade, including slave caravans, remained strong into the 17th century. Instead they see the jihad as an attempt to unite the Black cultivators of the valley in an Islamic state under the leadership of the Berber clerics.

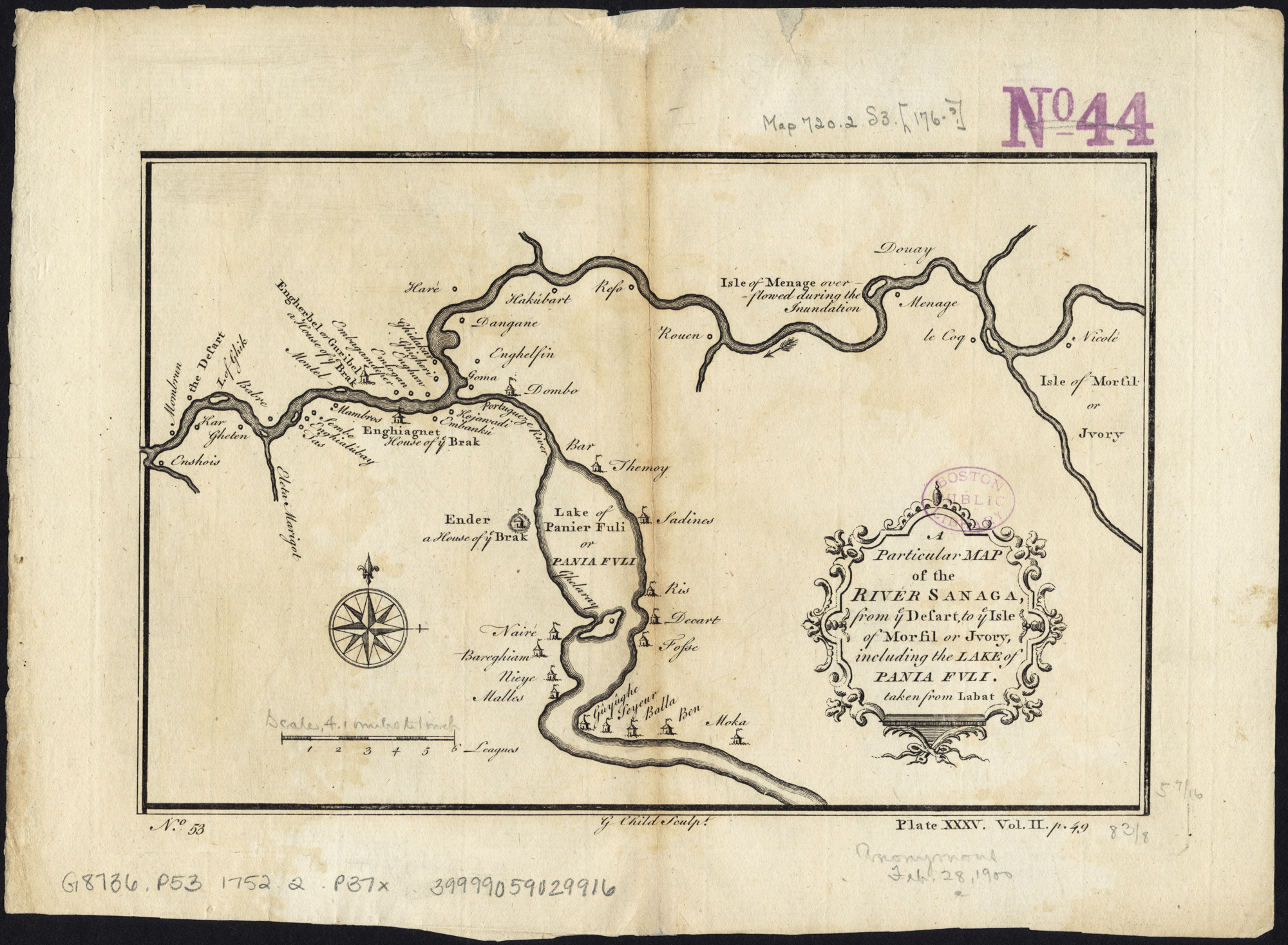
A map of the middle Senegal River, taken from the work of Jean-Baptiste Labat.

=== On the Senegal ===
Among the Wolof and Fula states of the Senegal River valley, the Atlantic slave trade had also engendered a profound social and political crisis. Wars became more frequent as the rulers of the Denianke kingdom, Waalo, Jolof and Cayor used the sale of captives to fund their increasingly powerful royal armies as well as their personal tastes for imported luxuries and alcohol. If a long period of peace threatened their bottom line, European slavers would often encourage or even bribe the rulers into starting a new war, giving them guns and powder upfront, and being repaid in slaves. If a foreign enemy could not be found, rulers often accused entire villages of disloyalty on flimsy pretexts and rounded up the inhabitants to be sold. Similarly, the legal system was corrupted, and enslavement became a standard punishment for minor crimes.

As the slave trade was tearing their societies apart, many Wolof and Fula were increasingly adopting Islam as a counterweight to the ruling class. The 16th century had seen a gradual transition where local marabout families, initially mostly Berber outsiders, naturalized and melted into the surrounding population. This class of Wolof Muslim leaders would play a major role in the Marabout War. In Futa Toro, the Torodbe class of native Muslim scholars had been around for centuries, and were generally oppressed by the ruling class. They were, however, numerous and influential among the population of the middle Senegal valley.

== Beginnings ==
Awbek b. Ashfaga was a well-known Zawaya scholar and ascetic who gained a reputation for knowledge, saintliness, miracle cures, and clairvoyance. For three years he preached and built up a community of followers made up primarily of Zawaya but open to all believers, transcending ethnic and tribal divisions. He began calling for the formation of an Islamic state that would resemble the ideal society of the early Caliphs. He went by numerous self-appointed titles, such as Sayyiduna (our master), Imamuna (our Imam), and Mushi al-Din (he who spreads the faith), before finally settling on Nasr al-Din (protector of the faith). Nasr demanded the loyalty of all of the Zawaya, forcing every Zawaya leader to swear allegiance to him. His government was composed of himself, a vizier, and four qadis, and tasked itself with enforcing order in the southern Sudan, known as Qibla. Nasr set himself the goals of fighting those who he believed had neglected Islam and oppressed Muslims, uniting the various groups of the region in a single state, and creating a new and divinely-guided order.

As Nasr looked to expand his reach, he looked first to the states south of the Senegal River. The southern rulers frequently raided Zawaya communities and held many women and children as slaves; stopping the raids and freeing the captives was an important motivation. It also gave him the opportunity to gain control of a regional breadbasket, as well as the entrepôts for the gum trade along the Senegal, which could offset Hassaniya control of Portendick on the Saharan coast. The move also avoided a confrontation with powerful Hassani groups, many of whom were prepared to acknowledge his spiritual authority.

The kings of Senegambia, however, were prepared to do no such thing. Nasr sent emissaries and preachers to the court of the Silatigi Sire Sawa Laamu and other kings demanding that they more closely follow the tenets of Sharia law, restrict themselves to four wives, and stop pillaging and enslaving their own subjects. These entreaties, sent to rulers who already identified as Muslims, were ignored. In total seven messengers were sent to the Silatigi, but each time he refused to heed the call.

== Course of the war ==
=== Jihad on the Senegal ===
In early 1673, Nasr and a small group of followers entered Futa Toro. Rather than confront the much larger Denianke army, they toured the countryside preaching toubenan (repentance), an end to slave raids and oppression, and a recommitment to the law of God. The message spread quickly among the Torodbe and the local peasantry, who flocked to the marabout banner, and the movement quickly became a revolution. Old power structures were torn down, and village assemblies appeared in their place. With the entire population rising against him, Sawa Laamu fled to Gajaaga with his family and closest followers. Within a month of their arrival, the marabouts were in control of Futa Toro.

With his army strengthened by Torodbe recruits, Nasr next moved against the Kingdom of Jolof. Al Fadel ibn Abu Yadel led the invasion, took Ouarkhokh, and a man named Suranko was, according to legend, miraculously cured of blindness and then enthroned as ruler.

In Cayor not only the populace but parts of the garmi ruling class rallied to the marabout cause. Yacine Bubu, the former lingeer, had been controversially removed from her position by the new Damel Decce Maram. Seeing an opportunity, she and her entourage converted, allied with the qadi Njaay Sall, and together they overthrew and killed the damel in battle, taking control of both Cayor and Baol. Yacine Bubu then prevented Sall from taking power and establishing a fully Islamic state, forcing him to accept the appointment of her nephew Mafaly Gueye as damel.

A marabout army made up of Wolof and Fula adherents marched on Waalo, the last kingdom still standing south of the river. Brak Fara Kumba Mbodj fought obstinately, twice defeating the Toubenan forces in the field, but finally his capital was besieged, and he was killed. He was replaced by Yerim Kode from a rival royal matriline, who was functionally a prisoner of his marabout entourage. Meanwhile in Cayor, the new Damel Mafaly Gueye strayed from the path of orthodoxy and was caught drinking alcohol by Muslim partisans. Njaay Sall attacked Lambaye, Mafaly's capital, and executed him after only six months on the throne.

=== The war expands, Nasr ad-Din's death ===
By late 1673, with his base firmly established south of the Senegal and his personal power at its peak, Nasr turned his attention to strengthening his Islamic state. In early 1674 he sent his brother Munir ad-Din to Saint Louis to negotiate with the French, looking to keep them out of the conflict and re-open trade on Muslim terms. The victories of the Toubenan movement had given them control over the entire Senegal River valley, blocking almost all French trade and bottling them up in their island stronghold. In particular, the marabouts' blanket refusal to sell Muslims to Christians as slaves struck at the heart of French commercial interests. Negotiations made little progress. The French commander De Muchins attempted to impress Munir ad-Din with the power of the king of France, but was powerless to enforce his commercial priorities on the ascendant and unified Islamic state that the marabouts were building. Foremost among these priorities was the resumption of the slave trade.

As negotiations dragged on, Nasr moved north across the river and tried to impose the zakat on the warrior tribes. They refused, saying that Nasr did not have the right to do so since he was not a Caliph. One of the tributaries of the Lamtuna, a man named Bubba, persuaded his chief to call on Haddi b. Ahmad b. Daman, the leader of the Trarza, to help resist Nasr ad-Din, resulting in the war being called Shurbubba. Negotiations between the Zawaya and the Banu Maghfar went nowhere, and war broke out. Sides were drawn on religious, not ethnic lines. Most Zwaya and a few Hassaniya supported Nasr. The Brakna allied with the Trarza, and some Zwaya tribes did not join the war at all.

The first battle of the Shurbubba was a successful raid by the Zwaya at Intuji. The second was at Jiwa, when some of the Manu Maghfar managed to make off with Zwaya livestock before being tracked down and defeated. The third and most pivotal battle was at Tirtilass. Again the Zwaya emerged victorious, but Nasr ad-Din and many of his closest companions were killed. The traditional date of Nasr's death is August, but more recent scholarship has argued that he must have been dead by May 1674 at the latest.

Following Nasr's death the Zawaya elected al-Faqih al-Amin as the new Imam. The Zwaya were in a strong position, having won three battles, and the Banu Maghfar were ready to negotiate. An agreement was reached whereby the Hassan would recognize the spiritual authority of the Zawaya Imam, and in return the Imam would give up all political claims, including his ability to levy zakat. However the majority of the Zawaya, who still followed the militarism of Nasr ad-Din, were opposed to the compromise and deposed al-Amin. They instead elected Qadi Uthman, formerly Nasr al-Din's vizier and one of his closest companions. He revived the policy of militarism and non-negotiation with the Hassan. He also reintroduced the zakat, which alienated some of the weaker Berber tribes.

=== The tide turns ===
In Saint Louis, news of Nasr ad-Din's death ended all negotiations. Munir ad-Din left the town, and in May 1674 De Muchins managed to convince Yerim Koode, the erstwhile Muslim Brak who had replaced Fara Kumba, to abandon the marabout cause. De Muchins armed a flotilla and sailed up the river to raid Muslim areas for slaves. He attacked the western Futa and seized caravans crossing the river. In July he sailed again, pillaging 60 leagues upstream. Yerim Koode, meanwhile, conspired with the rebellious Berber tribes and Haddi of the Trarza to ambush the caravan collecting the zakat at the battle of Ulayb al-Ghazaya'. Uthman retaliated by raiding Waalo, but was killed by Yerim Koode near Guerouk in Biffeche, probably in May 1674.

By this time, some of the traditional aristocracies were beginning to strike back against the marabout cause. Silatigi Sire Sawa Laamu was raiding into the Futa from his base in Gajaaga. In Cayor, the Lingeer Yacine Bubu was alarmed by Njaay Sall's murder of Mafaly Gueye and his establishment of a theocratic government. She met secretly with powerful members of the garmi royal class, and they invited the Bour Saloum to invade and help drive out the Muslims. By August 1674, the marabout movement was dramatically weaker than it had been six months earlier.

=== Devastation and defeat ===
Following Uthman's death, a succession dispute saw more Berbers become disaffected and abandon the cause. Eventually Nur al Din took control of the movement, and worked to defend eastern Futa against the exiled Silatigi and the Hassan. Betrayed by his allies and beset by defections, Nur al Din was killed at Tin Yijmara by the Banu Maghfar.

Munir ad-Din, Nasr's brother, then rose to power. He was faced with a crisis, as the Brak Yerim Koode was raiding continuously in the western Futa Toro, burning villages and selling captives to the French. In March 1675 Munir ad-Din moved his army south of the Senegal and joined forces with the Muslims forces in the region, winning several victories against Sire Sawa Laamu. But he was betrayed while the bulk of the army was away, and was killed in a surprise attack on his camp.

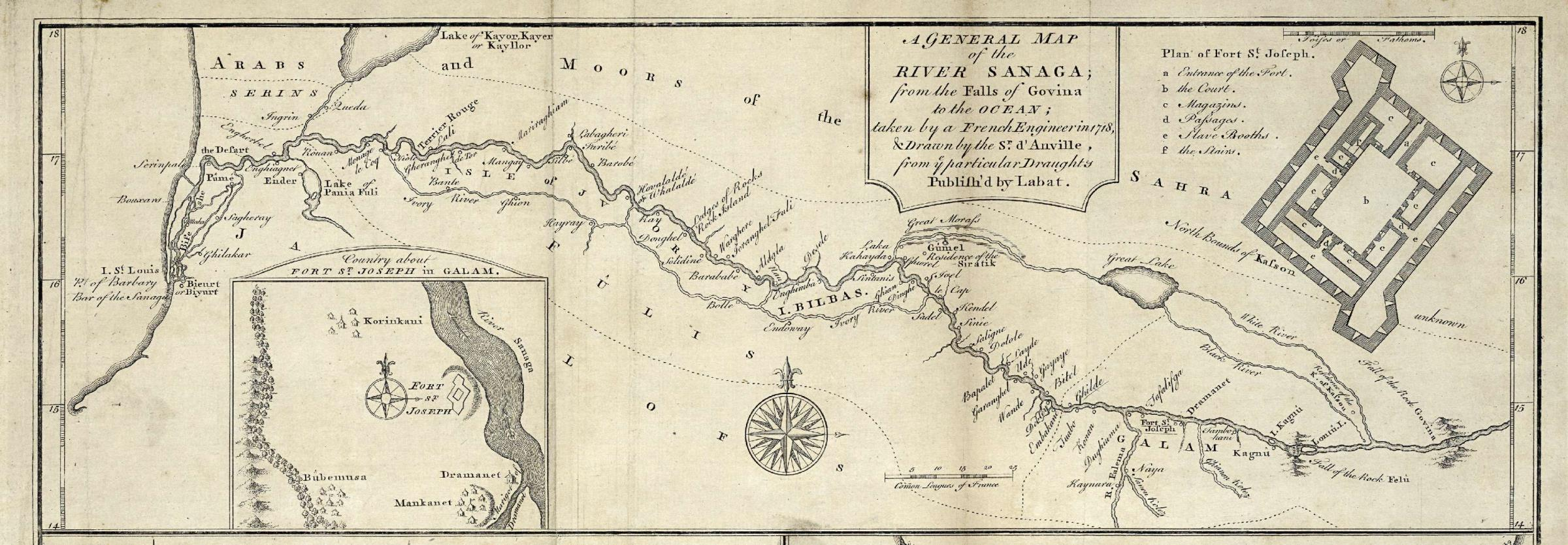
Early 18th century map of the Senegal, showing the Silatigi's (Siratik) residence and Gajaaga (Galam)

The final marabout emir was al-Mukhtar Agd 'Abdullah. He raided both the Banu Maghfar and the Black aristocracies with more success than his immediate predecessors, but he was unable to stem the tide. The entire region descended into chaos, with armies raiding, burning and pillaging widely. The crew of a French merchant vessel was massacred in November. The aristocracy used scorched-earth tactics against their rebellious Muslim subjects, leading to a terrible famine Yerim Koode was in the field continuously from November 1675 to January 1676, when he and Buurba Biram Penda defeated Suranko and Njaay Sall at Ndogal in Baol. Both Suranko and Yerim Koode were killed, but the Toubenan in Jolof was broken. Yerim Koode's successor, Fara Penda, was a particularly vicious raider, spending almost all of 1676 in the saddle, destroying the millet crop while it was still green and going as far as menacing the emir's base on Morfil Island. For the peasantry things were now even worse than they had been before, and disillusionment mounted. The Silatigi was restored by May 1677. In Cayor, Yacine Bubu and her allies from Saloum defeated Njaay Sall at Xelere. In 1677 Al-Mukhtar was cornered at Amadir and chose martyrdom rather than retreat, and the last survivors of Nasr ad-Din's movement fled south.

== Consequences ==
As a result of their defeat the Zawaya relinquished all claims to political or military authority and paid tribute to the Hassan for their protection. Hassani warriors were given the right to drink the milk from Zawaya herds and access to a third of the water from Zawaya wells. Zawaya also had to accommodate passing Hassani for three days. The Zawaya were also broken up as a group amongst the Hassani, with each Hassani group having its own Zawaya. In general however the conditions endured by the Zawaya differed little from those before the war. Politically, however, they were now powerless. Instead, the Emirates of Trarza and Brakna were established with the active military support of the Sultan of Morocco, and became major players in the lucrative gum trade. These emirates became active and permanent fixtures of the Senegambian political mix, exerting constant military pressure on their neighbors to the south.

A devastating famine gripped the entire country for several years beginning in 1676, with people forced to eat leather and grass, and the Europeans in Saint Louis surviving only off of food imported from France. Desperate peasants ate much of their livestock, destroying the export of hides. When this ran out, whole families sold themselves into slavery rather than starve to death. The slave trade boomed. With the traditional Wolof and Fula aristocracy re-entrenched, wars and raiding between the kingdoms became endemic, providing even more chattel for French slave ships. The lower classes bore the brunt of both the attacks from Mauritania and the slave raids, and increasingly turned to Islam as a potential political counterweight to the established aristocratic regimes known as the ceddo (royal slave soldiers).

Despite the defeat, the militancy of Zawaya religious teaching did not diminish, and eventually spread to neighbouring countries in the Sudan. Some Torodbe migrated south to found the state of Bundu. and others continued on to the Futa Jallon where their descendants would ultimately found an Imamate. The Marabout War inspired an increasingly militant tone of Islamic preaching and created links between Berber and Torodbe groups, both of which helped set in motion and invigorate internal conflicts that would eventually lead to the Fula jihads, which culminated in the rise of the Sokoto Caliphate and the Toucouleur Empire. The first of these jihads, in Futa Jallon and Futa Toro, were modeled directly on Nasr ad-Din's movement.

== See also ==
- Fula jihads
- Soninke-Marabout wars

== References and notes ==
=== Bibliography ===
- Ba, Idrissa (2020). "Trans-Saharan Trade and Its Logics of Accommodation in Relation to Transatlantic Trade Between the 15th and the 19th Centuries". Varia Historia. doi:10.1590/0104-87752020000200004.
- Barry, Boubacar (1992). "Senegambia from the sixteenth to the eighteenth century: evolution of the Wolof, Sereer and 'Tukuloor'". In Ogot, B. A. (ed.). General History of Africa vol. V: Africa from the Sixteenth to the Eighteenth Century. UNESCO. ISBN 978-0-520-03916-2.
- Barry, Boubacar (1998). Senegambia and the Atlantic slave trade. Cambridge, UK: Cambridge University Press. ISBN 978-0-521-59760-9.
- Barry, Boubacar (2012). The Kingdom of Waalo: Senegal Before the Conquest. New York: Diasporic Africa Press. ISBN 978-0-966-02011-3.
- Boulegue, Jean (1981). "Un empire peul dans le Soudan occidental au début du XVIIe siècle" [A Fulani empire in the Western Sudan in the early 17th century]. 2000 ans d’histoire africaine. Le sol, la parole et l'écrit. Mélanges en hommage à Raymond Mauny. Tome II [2,000 Years of African History: Land, Oral Tradition, and the Written Word. Essays in Honor of Raymond Mauny. Volume II.] (in French). Paris: Société française d'histoire d'outre-mer. p. 701. ISBN 2-85970-005-6.
- Boulegue, Jean (2013). Les royaumes wolof dans l'espace sénégambien (XIIIe-XVIIIe siècle) [The Wolof kingdoms in the Senegambian region] (in French). Paris: Karthala Editions. ISBN 978-2-811-10881-6.
- Curtin, Philip D. (1971). "Jihad in West Africa: Early Phases and Inter-Relations in Mauritania and Senegal". Journal of African History. 12 (1): 11–24.
- Curtin, Philip D. (2024). Migration and Mortality in Africa and the Atlantic World, 1700–1900. Routledge. ISBN 978-1-040-24429-6.
- Gomez, Michael A. (2002-07-04). Pragmatism in the Age of Jihad: The Precolonial State of Bundu. Cambridge University Press. ISBN 978-0-521-52847-4.
- Handloff, Robert Earl (1990). Mauritania: a country study. Federal Research Division, Library of Congress. p. 11. ISBN 978-0-160-19797-0.
- Kane, Oumar (2004). La première hégémonie peule. Le Fuuta Tooro de Koli Teηella à Almaami Abdul. Paris: Karthala. ISBN 978-2-845-86521-1.
- Klein, Martin A. (2005). "Futa-Tooro: Early Nineteenth Century". Encyclopedia of African History. Vol. 1. Fitzroy Dearborn. p. 541. ISBN 978-1-579-58245-6.
- Levtzion, Nehemia (1975). "North-West Africa: from the Maghrib to the fringes of the forest". In Gray, Richard (ed.). The Cambridge History of Africa, Volume 4. Cambridge University Press. ISBN 0-521-20413-5.
- McDougall, E. Ann (2007). "The Caravel and the Caravan: Reconsidering Received Wisdom in the Sixteenth-Century Sahara". In Mancall, Peter C. (ed.). The Atlantic World and Virginia, 1550-1624. Chapel Hill: University of North Carolina Press. ISBN 978-0-807-83159-5.
- Norris, H. T. (1969). "Znāga Islam during the seventeenth and eighteenth centuries". Bulletin of the School of Oriental and African Studies. 32 (3).
- Thomas, Douglas H. (2021). "The Lingeer's Jihad: Challenging a Male-Normative Reading of African History" (PDF). History in Africa. 48: 326–8. doi:10.1017/hia.2021.10. S2CID 246702643.
- Warscheid, Ismail (2020). "The West African Jihād Movements and the Islamic Legal Literature of the Southwestern Sahara (1650–1850)". Journal of West African History. 6 (2).
- Webb, James (1995). Desert Frontier: Ecological and Economic Change Along the Western Sahel, 1600-1850. Madison: University of Wisconsin Press. ISBN 0-29914-330-9.
