= Shaikh Amadou Ba =

19th century Fula religious leader

Amadou Cheikhou Ba
- Mahdi
- Born: c. 1830; Ouro-Madiou, Imamate of Futa Toro
- Died: February 11 1875; Diaye-Diorde, Cayor
- Father: Hame Ba
- Religion: Islam

Shaikh Amadou Ba (also spelled Shaixu Amadu, or known as Amadu Mahdiyu) was a powerful Tijani prophetic leader in what is now northern Senegal, active from 1868 to 1875. At the peak of his power he controlled several pre-colonial states, before being defeated and killed.

== Family and Youth ==
Shaikh Amadou Ba was the son of Hame Ba, a messianic cleric from Futa Toro who had declared himself the Mahdi in 1828. When he prepared to sacrifice his son, claiming that God had told him to imitate Abraham, he was driven out of the region and joined serigne Koki Ndiaga Issa Diop's invasion of Waalo. When this failed he returned to Futa Toro and founded the village of Ouro-Madiou near Podor, where Amadou was born.

== Messianic Movement ==
In 1868 a cholera epidemic broke out in Senegambia. Inspired by his father and al-hajj Umar Tall's examples, Shaikh Amadou saw it as a sign of the apocalypse, with himself as the Mahdi and the Tijaniyyah as the only community of true believers. After demanding that the leaders of the region follow him, he was forced into exile by the ruling religious establishment of the Imamate of Futa Toro. He raided Coki, where his brother had recruited many followers to his movement.

Shaikh Amadou allied with Lat Jor, Damel of Cayor, and defeated the French in the battle of Mekhe on July 8th, 1869. This alliance was short-lived, however, and the Madiyankobe (followers of the Mahdi) returned to Futa Toro, where they found Ouro-Madiou burned by a force of French and Torodbe. Shaikh Amadou would fight a series of battles against Waalo-Waalo, Torodbe, and French enemies. After a defeat in February 1870 he retreated to central Futa then into the neighboring Jolof. He and his followers besieged the buurba in his tata at Yang-Yang, forcing him to convert in August 1870 and Islamizing the society. Resistance remained, however, led by the tuube Sanor Ndiaye and prince Alboury Ndiaye. Sanor and his allies would ultimately be defeated at the Battle of Aniam-Touguel on August 14th 1871. After his submission to Shaikh Amadou, he became the puppet buurba in March 1873, but Alboury Ndiaye's resistance continued.

Amadou's relationship with Lat Jor had continued to sour as the Damel signed a treaty with the French and supported his cousin Alboury in his guerilla war in Jolof. They clashed over control of Baol until Amadou Ba invaded Cayor in July 1874. His forces won a series of victories against Lat Jor and his allies, until the French intervened. With the support of their heavy artillery, Lat Jor won the bloody Battle of Samba Sadio on February 11, 1875. Ba was killed at Diaye-Diorde as he fled back to Jolof, and his movement evaporated.
