= List of rulers of Futa Toro =

The rulers of Futa Toro were Muslim monarchs with the regnal title of Almamy. They ruled the Almamyate of Futa Toro from the late 18th century into the late 19th century. It was the first Muslim Fula dynasty of Futa Toro, and it overthrew the pagan Denianke dynasty of the Empire of Great Fulo in 1776/

== List of independent Almamys of Futa Toro ==
- Abdelkedir (1776 – 1804)
- Mustafa (1804 – 1861)

Futa Toro is incorporated into the jihad of Umar Tall

== List of Almamys of Futa Toro under Toucouleur Empire ==
- Mustafa (1861 – 1868)
- Ahmadu Sego (1868 – 1875)
- Abdul Bu Bakar (1875 – 1877)

Futa Toro is incorporated into the Senegal Colony

== List of Almamys of Futa Toro as part of the Senegal Colony ==
- Abdul Bu Bakar (1877–1891)

== See also ==
- Empire of Great Fulo
- Toucouleur Empire
- History of Senegal

== Sources ==
- Stewart, John (1989). African States and Rulers: An Encyclopedia of Native, Colonial, and Independent States and Rulers Past and Present. Jefferson: McFarland & Company. p. 395 Pages. ISBN 0-89950-390-X.
