= French conquest of Senegal =

1659–19th century process

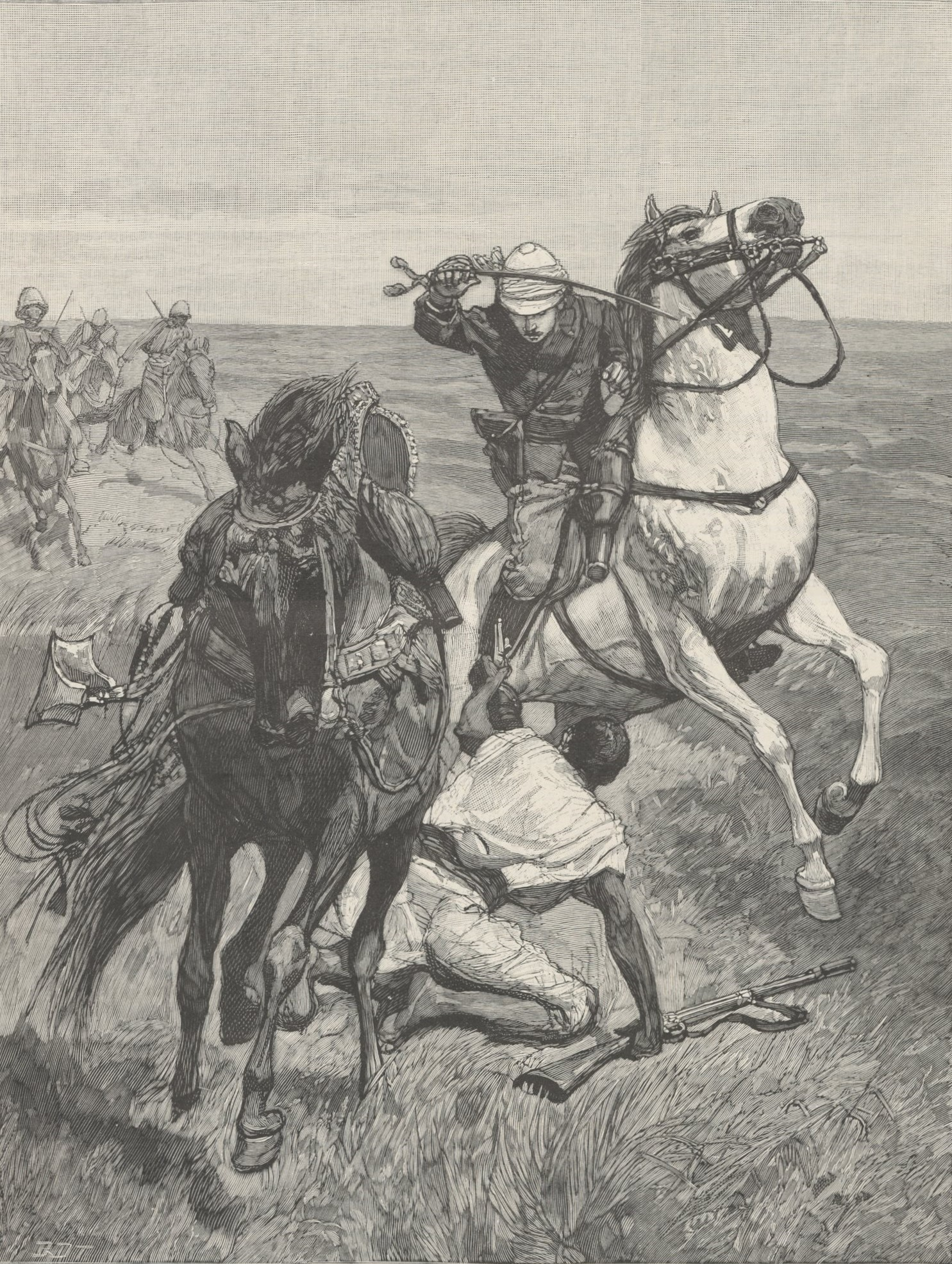
- Fight of Lieutenant of spahis Chauvet and Damel Samba-Lawbe (etching after J. Chełmoński in Le Monde illustré magazine, 1886)
Location	Present-day Senegal
Result	France conquers territory of present-day Senegal; Establishment of French Senegal

Belligerents
Kingdom of Waalo; Cayor Kingdom; Kingdom of Jolof; Kingdom of Baol; Kingdom of Sine; Kingdom of Saloum	France

The French conquest of Senegal started in 1659 with the establishment of Saint-Louis, Senegal, followed by the French capture of the island of Gorée from the Dutch in 1677, but would only become a full-scale campaign in the 19th century.

== First establishments ==
According to some historians, French merchants from the Normandy cities of Dieppe and Rouen traded with the Gambia and Senegal coasts, and with the Ivory Coast and the Gold Coast, between 1364 and 1413. Probably, as a result, an ivory-carving industry developed in Dieppe after 1364. These travels, however, were soon forgotten with the advent of the Hundred Years' War in France.

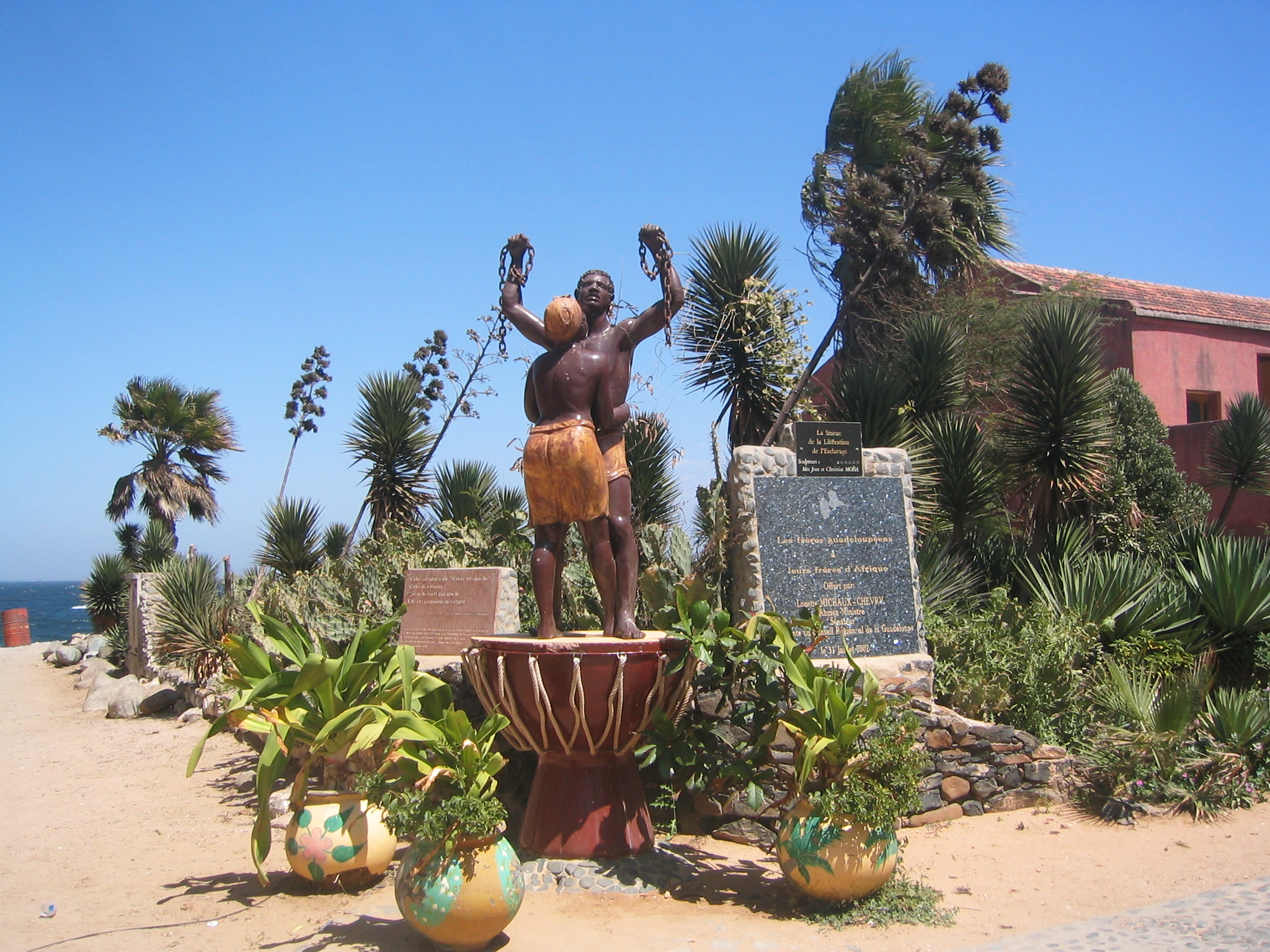
Monument near the Maison des Esclaves on Gorée Island

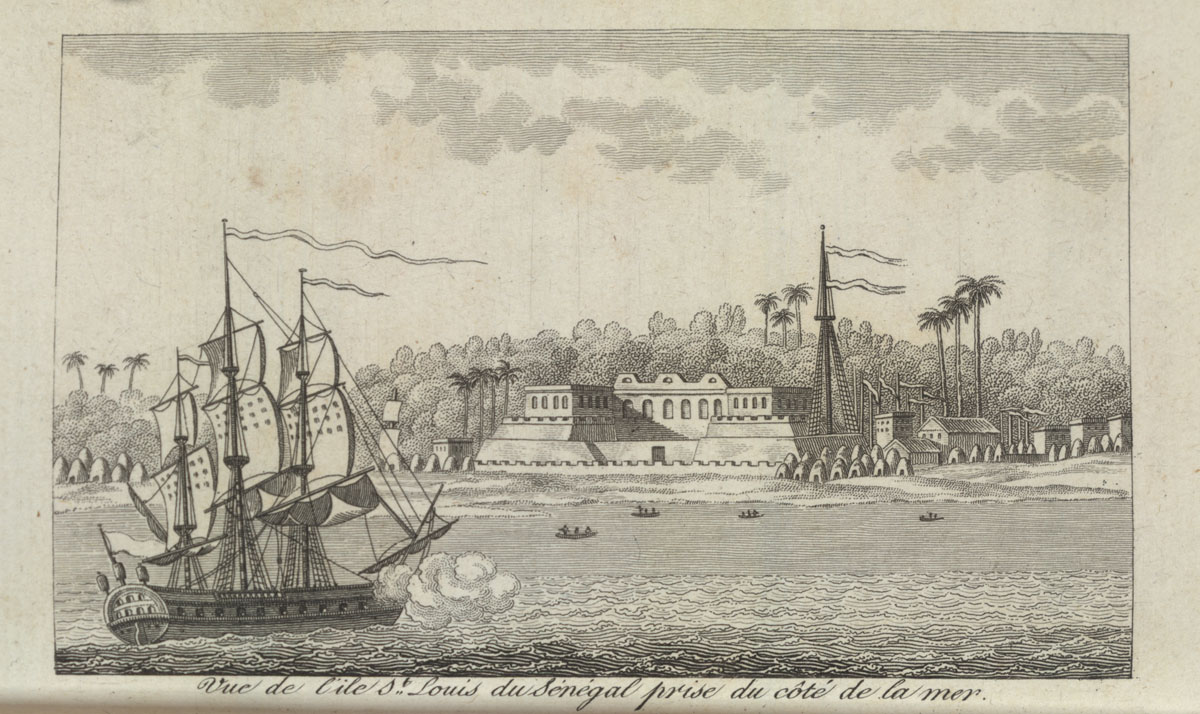
Saint-Louis in 1780

Various European powers, such as Portugal, the Netherlands, and England then competed for trade in the area of Senegal from the 16th century onward. The island was captured by the Dutch in 1588, where they established defensive forts and developed trade further.

In 1659, France established the trading post of Saint-Louis, Senegal. The European powers continued contending for the island of Gorée, until in 1677, France led by Jean II d'Estrées during the Franco-Dutch War (1672–1678) ended up in possession of the island, which it would keep for the next 300 years. In 1758 the French settlement was captured by a British expedition as part of the Seven Years' War, but was later returned to France in 1783, following French victory in the American Revolutionary War.

The states of the Wolof and Sereer, neighbouring the two colonial outposts, were particularly involved with the slave trade, having strong military organizations geared to supplying slaves to the Europeans. According to historians such as Professor François G. Richard and Professor Martin A. Klein, the Serer states such as Sine and Saloum were not heavily involved in the slave trade. François G. Richard posits that:

The Kingdom of Sine remained a modest participant in the Atlantic system, secondary to the larger Wolof, Halpulaar [speakers of the Pulaar language i.e. the Fula and Toucouleur people] or Mandinka polities surrounding it on all sides... As practices of enslavement intensified among other ethnic groups during the 18th century, fueling a lucrative commerce in captives and the rise of internal slavery, the Siin may have been demoted to the rank of second player, in so far as the kingdom was never a major supplier of captives.

— François G. Richard

In his 1968 publication: Islam and Imperialism in Senegal: Sine-Saloum, 1947-1914, Professor Martin A. Klein notes that, although slavery had existed in Wolof and Serer culture, as well that of their neighbors, the institution of slavery did not exist among the Serer Noon, Serer N'Diéghem, and the Jola people, "who had egalitarian social structures and simple political institutions." Klein also notes that: "In times of peace, the Kingdom of Siin more readily supplied grain, cattle and other basic necessities to the French." According to Professor Mamadou Diouf and Professor Mara Leichtman (2009), the Serer Saafi were also purely egalitarian and rejected all forms of centralised government, the caste system, Islam and slavery.

Conflicts erupted with the Muslims to the north, as when Marabout Nasr al Din attacked Mauritania and the Wolof across the border in 1673, but he was defeated through an alliance between local forces and the French.

== 19th-century territorial conquests ==
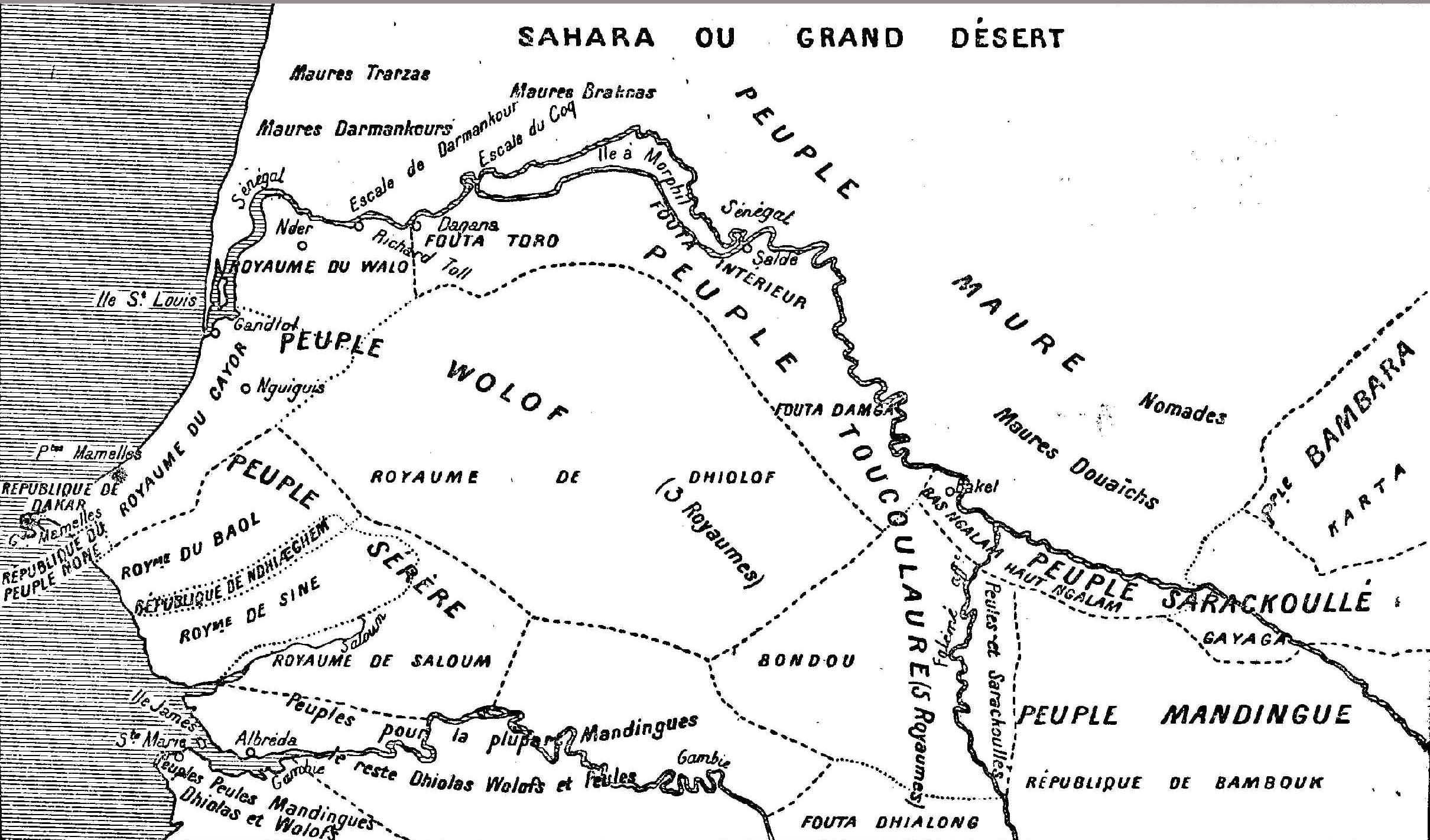
The Senegal River area, 1853

During the Napoleonic Wars, Great Britain captured Gorée in 1803 and Saint-Louis in 1809, and proclaimed the abolition of the slave trade in 1807, to which the French had to agree upon recovering the two posts. The 19th century thus saw a decline in the slave trade, and the rise of commodity production instead. The trade of acacia gum, used for dyes for high-quality textiles and for medicine production, became paramount. Peanut cultivation also proved to be a valuable resource for the area.

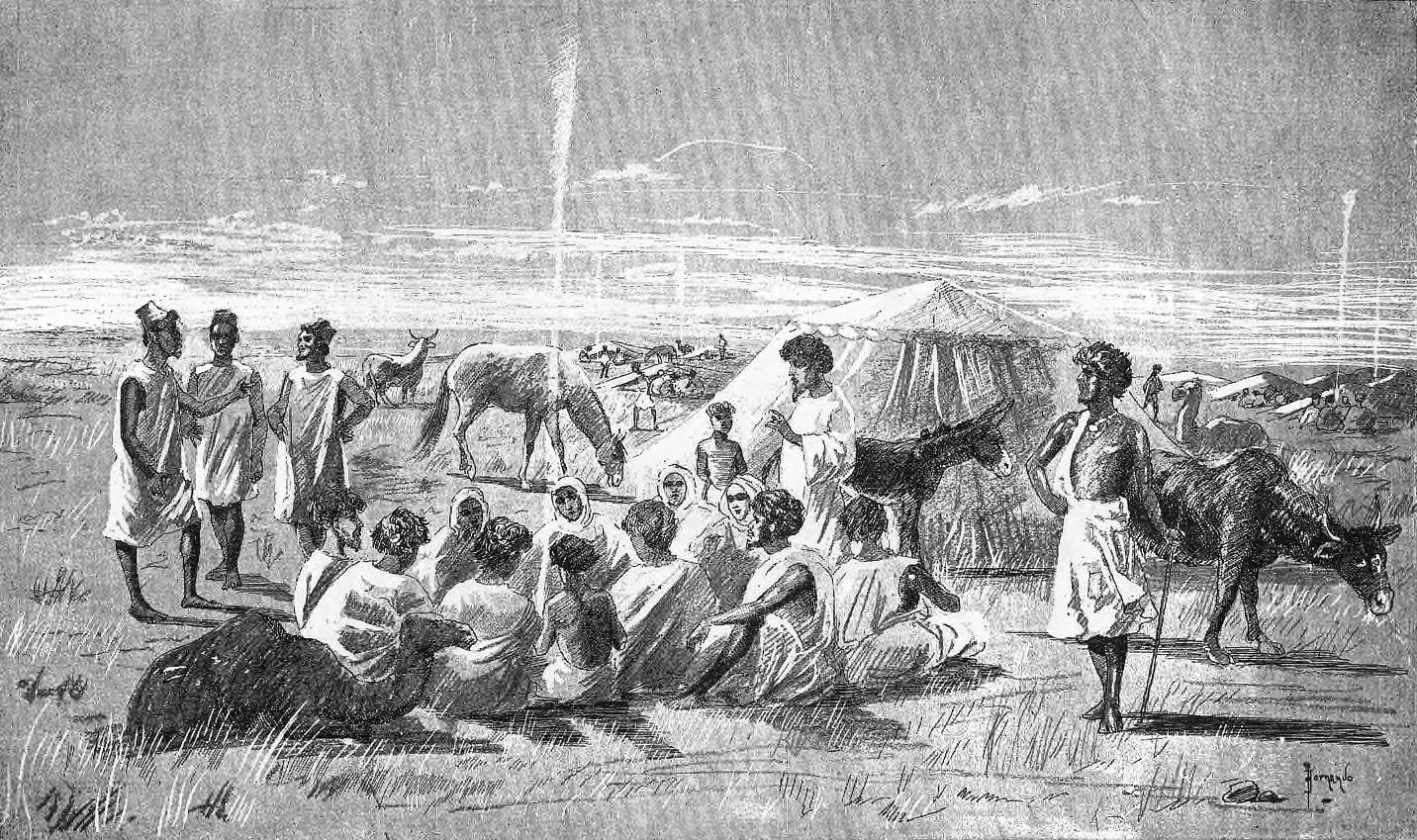
Moorish tribes meet to trade gum arabic at Bakel on the Senegal River, 1890

In the Franco-Trarzan War of 1825, the French started to assert control of the mouth of the Senegal river against the rival state of Trarza.

In the 1850s the French, under the governor Louis Faidherbe, began to expand their foothold onto the Senegalese mainland at the expense of the native kingdoms. From 1854 Faidherbe started to establish a series of inland forts up the Senegal River. In 1855 he conquered the Kingdom of Waalo defeating Queen Ndaté Yalla Mbodj (the reigning Lingeer of Waalo at the time) and her husband Marosso Tassé Diop (commander of her army). A counter-attack by the Toucouleur in 1857 led to the Siege of Medina Fort in which the Toucouleur failed. In 1859, the Serers of Sine, led by their king - Maad a Sinig Kumba Ndoffene Famak Joof launched an attack against the French and their ally forces, resulting in the Battle of Logandème. Although defeated at Logandème in Fatick, and one of his principalities (Fatick) burned to the ground under the orders of Faidherb, Kumba Ndoffene spent the next few years of his life destroying French infrastructure and their economic base in Senegal, as well as defending his country from another threat - Islamic jihad by the Muslim marabouts of Senegambia. In 1871 he was assassinated by the French. The precolonial monarchies of Sine and Saloum continued up to 1969 without interruption, despite the French conquest of Senegal.

West Africa circa 1875

By 1860, the forts built between Médine and St. Louis allowed Faidherbe to launch missions against the Trarza Moors in Waalo (north of the Senegal river), who had previously collected taxes on goods coming to Saint-Louis from the interior. Faidherbe also started the westernization of the area by developing banks, civil administration, and also established an accord with Senegal's religion, Islam.

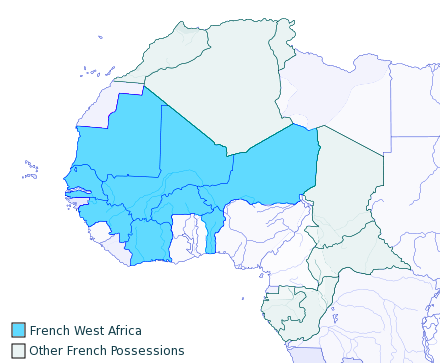
In 1902, Dakar became the capital of French West Africa.

Expansion continued under Governor Louis Brière de l'Isle from 1876 to 1881. Through diplomatic and military efforts, Briere reinforced French control on the Senegal river, the "Peanut Basin" and the Guinea Coast in favour of the development of millet, peanut and cotton trade. He also developed railroad projects that would facilitate further expansion as far as French Sudan (modern Mali).

From 1880, France endeavoured to build a railway system, centered around the Saint-Louis–Dakar line that involved taking military control of the surrounding areas, leading to the military occupation of mainland Senegal. The construction of the Dakar-Niger Railway also began at the end of the 19th century under the direction of the French officer Gallieni. However, there was much opposition of the railroads being built from the natives. This was especially true with Muslim leader Lat Jor and his following.

The first Governor General of Senegal was named in 1895, overseeing most of the territorial conquests of Western Africa, and in 1904, the territories were formally named French West Africa (French: AOF: Afrique Occidentale Française), of which Senegal was a part and Dakar its capital.

== See also ==
- History of Senegal
- List of colonial heads of French Sénégal
- Assimilation (French colonialism) – a policy that ostensibly offered rights and French citizenship to native Africans colonised by France
- Indigénat – laws and regulations which created in practice an inferior legal status for natives of French colonies from 1881 until the 1940s
