= Abdul Bokar Kan =

- Died: 4 August 1891; Mauritania
- Occupation: Political leader of upper Futa Toro
- Known for: Resistance to French colonization

Abdul Bokar Kan, also called Abdul Bubakar, (died 4 August 1891) was the de facto ruler of the upper part of the Imamate of Futa Toro in the late nineteenth century. This included parts of what are now Mauritania and Senegal along both banks of the Senegal River. After his death, the French colonial powers took full control of the territory.

Abdul Bokar Kan was the head of the Booseya clan of Futa Toro. He formed an alliance with Muhammad wul Hayba, the head of the Awlād A'li of the Gorgol region. The almami of Futa Toro at that time was Abdul Boubakar, but his power was nominal. In June 1864 the Moors and Booseya Fula collaborated in plundering trade barges that had become stranded near Saldé, drawing savage French reprisals against both groups.

After Amadu Toro died, the lower part of Futa Toro was safe for French river traffic. Abdul Bokar Kan was the de facto ruler of the upper Futa. He had eliminated Tierno Brahin, one of his rivals, in 1869. The Wan family, led by Ibra Almami, rivalled his power in the lower part of Futa Toro, but in the upper part he had gained full power. The French generally encouraged Abdul Bokar Kan and other Futa Toro strongmen when they attacked caravans in the region, since they hoped that would discourage migration away from the region to Kaarta.

Under growing pressure from the French colonial power in Senegambia, Abdul Bokar Kan did what he could to protect his land, income and power in Futa Toro through diplomatic means. In 1877, Bubakar was forced to recognize a French protectorate over his province. Despite this recognition, he allied with Fula and Wolof neighbors to continue fighting the French until the 1890s.

In 1890 the French military embarked on a campaign to eliminate the last remaining autonomous states. Abdul Bokar fled, but was assassinated by the Moors. Abdul Bokar died in Mauritania in August 1891.

== Notes and references ==
Notes

Citations

Sources

- Fage, John Donnelly (1985-09-05). The Cambridge History of Africa. Cambridge University Press. ISBN 978-0-521-22803-9.
- Hanson, John H. (1996). Migration, Jihad, and Muslim Authority in West Africa: The Futanke Colonies in Karta. Indiana University Press. p. 75. ISBN 978-0-253-33088-8.
- Lipschutz, Mark R.; Rasmussen, R. Kent (1989-10-01). Dictionary of African Historical Biography. University of California Press. p. 1. ISBN 978-0-520-06611-3.
- McDougall, James; Scheele, Judith (2012-06-08). Saharan Frontiers: Space and Mobility in Northwest Africa. Indiana University Press. ISBN 978-0-253-00131-3.
