= Nasr ad-Din (Lamtuna) =

Mauritanian religious leader

Imam Nasr ad-Din was a Lamtuna Berber religious and military leader, who from 1644 to 1674 led an alliance of Sanhadja Berber tribes against the Maqil Arabs of the western Sahara desert (mainly today's Mauritania, southern Morocco and Western Sahara). His movement also spread into what is now Senegal, leading to the overthrow of several traditional rulers.

In the 1660s, the Lamtuna preacher named Ashfaga took the title 'Nasr ad-Din', meaning 'defender of the faith.' He began preaching reform, and his message soon spread across the Senegal River. When the rulers of the Futa Toro, Jolof, Waalo and Cayor rejected his appeal, his followers and fellow religious leaders rose up in revolt, installing Islamic rulers in the place of the traditional aristocracy.

Nasr ad-Din was killed in battle in 1674 and the Char Bouba war (or 30-years war) was lost by the Berber tribes. They were reduced to subordinate roles in the elaborate tribal hierarchy that was then developed by the Arabo-Berber Moorish people that resulted from the fusion between indigenous and immigrant peoples. The traditional ruling classes in the Wolof and Fula states south of the Senegal reasserted their power as well, relegating the local clerics to mere religious figures rather than political ones.

== See also ==
- History of Mauritania
- History of Western Sahara
- History of Senegal
- Cayor
- Torodbe
