= Yangyang Monastery =

Buddhist monastery in Sikkim, northeastern India

Religion
- Affiliation: Tibetan Buddhism

Location
- Location: Sikkim, India
- Country: India

Architecture
- Established: 1840; 186 years ago

Yangyang or Yangang Monastery is a Buddhist monastery in Yangang, Sikkim, northeastern India.

Yangang Tashi Palding Monasery was established by Vth Lhatsun Pema Dechhen Gyatso in 1787 A.D. In 1841 it was renovated.
