= Yang-Yang =

Town in Louga Region, Senegal

- Town
- Location within Senegal
- Coordinates: 15°35′N 15°21′W
- Country: Senegal
- Region: Louga Region
- Department: Linguere Department
- Arrondissement: Yang-Yang Arrondissement

Area
  - Total: 588.1 km^{2} (227.1 sq mi)
- Elevation: 20 m (66 ft)

Population (2023)
  - Total: 5,795
  - Density: 9.854/km^{2} (25.52/sq mi)
- Time zone: UTC+0 (GMT)

Yang-Yang is a village in northern Senegal, the seat of the eponymous Yang-Yang Arrondissement since 1976. It was made the capital of the Kingdom of Jolof in 1865 under Bakane Tam Khary Dialor.

Buurba Alboury Ndiaye built a tata in the town to defend it, using a labor force of 3000 men. The defenses successfully repelled an attach by Bara Ba, cousin of Shaikh Amadou Ba, in 1875.

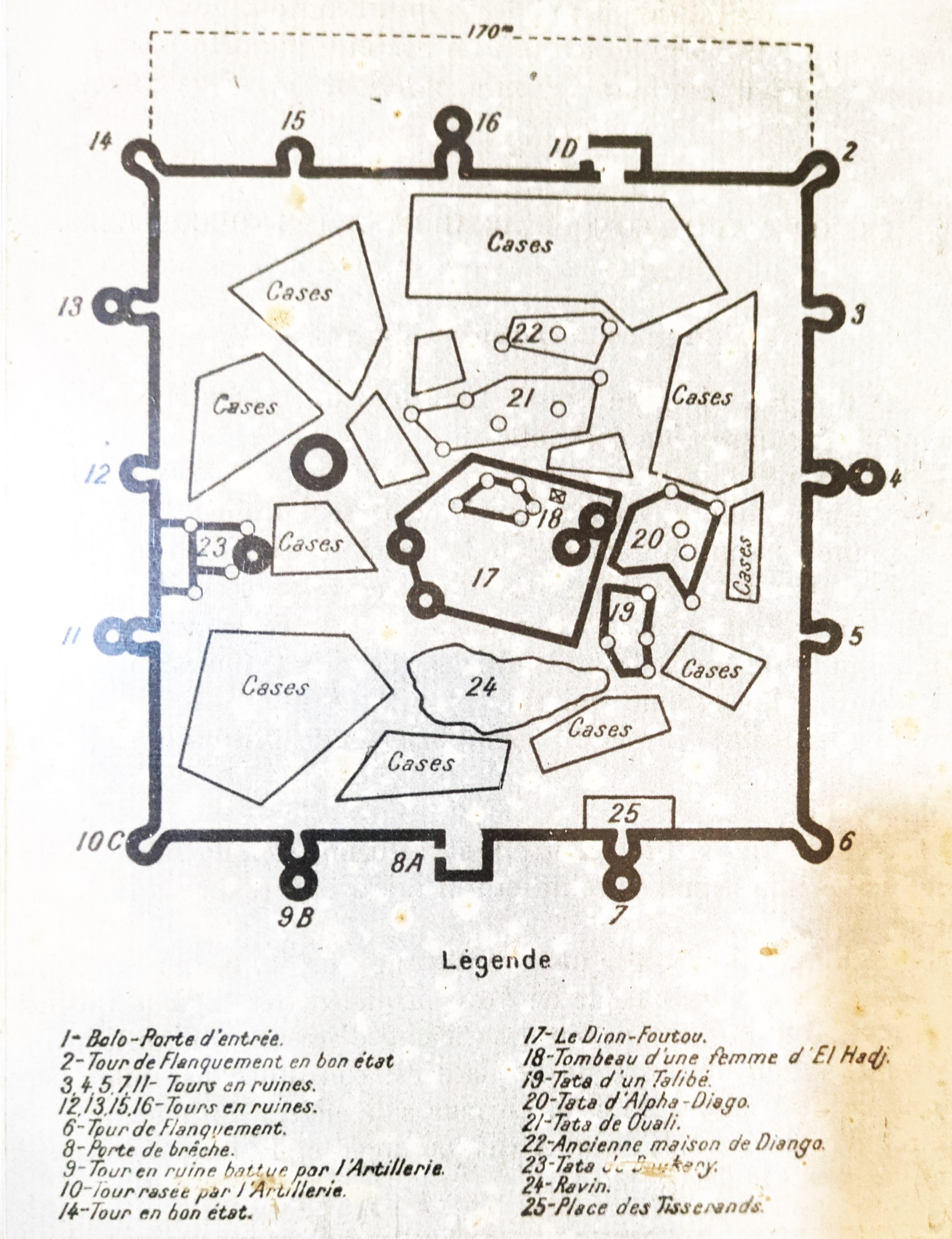
A map of the tata of Yang-Yang, Senegal after its conquest by the French

Yang-Yang was captured and burned by a French column led by Alfred Dodds in May 1890, bringing Jolof into the French colonial empire as a protectorate.

Yang-Yang was the site of the first colonial school in Jolof, founded in 1897. The remains of the tata, palace, and a stele marking the location of the mosque with several prominent graves are on the list of National Historic Monuments of Senegal. The former palace hosts the Museum of the History of Jolof and Franco-Senegalese Friendship, founded by Mansour Bouna Ndiaye, son of the last Buurba of Jolof.

== Sources ==
- Charles, Eunice A. (1977). Precolonial Senegal : the Jolof Kingdom, 1800-1890. Brookline, MA: African Studies Center, Boston University.
