= Lat Jor =

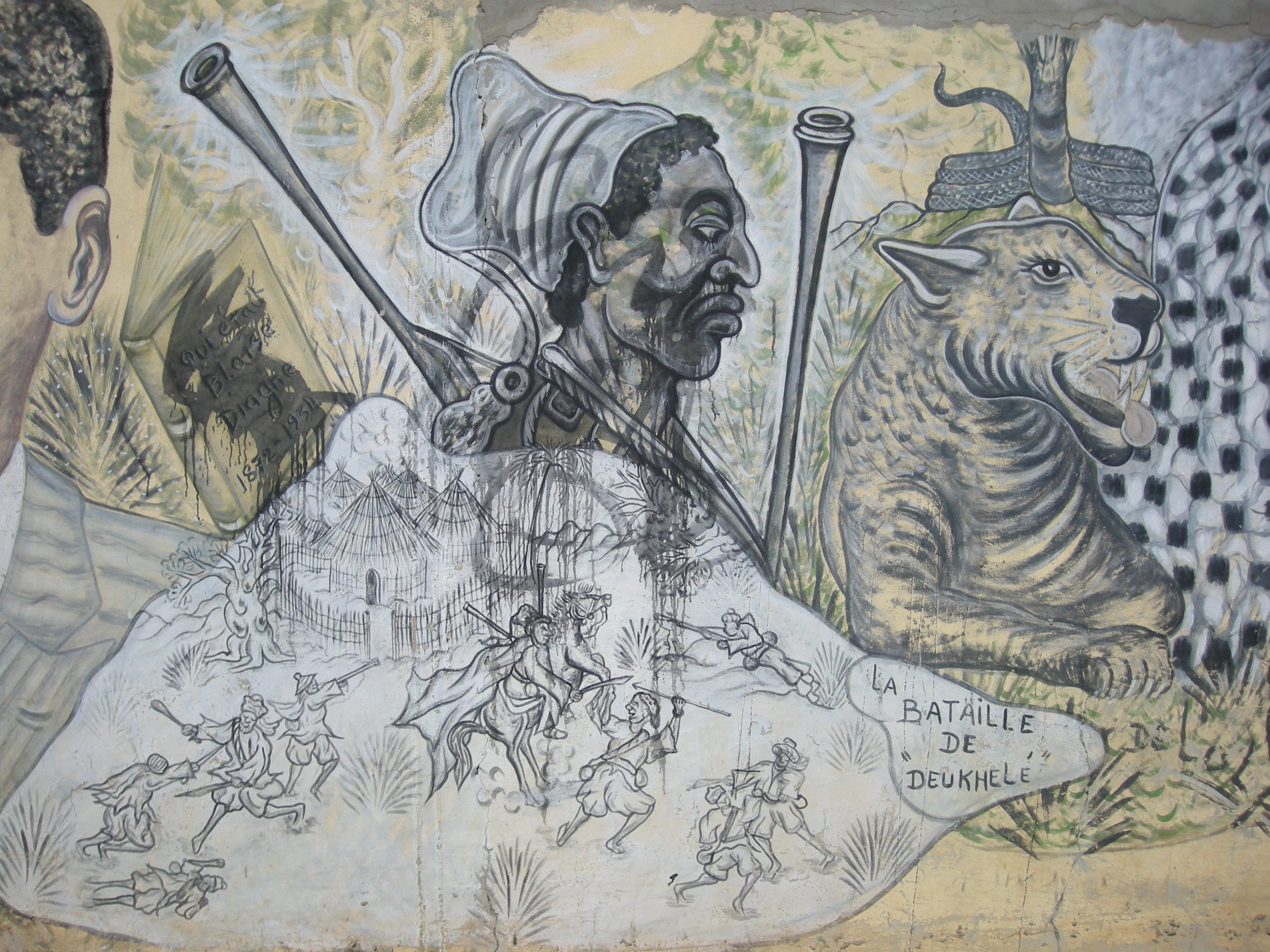
- A mural of Lat Jor in Dakar

Damel-Teigne
- Predecessor: Majojo
- Successor: Samba Lawbe Fall
- Born: c. 1842; Keur Amadou Yalla
- Died: 26 December 1886 (aged 43–44); Dekhele
- House: Guedj maternal dynasty
- Father: Sahewer Sohna Mbay Diop
- Mother: Ngoné Latir Fal
- Religion: Islam (Tijaniyyah)

Lat Jor Ngoné Latir Jop (Wolof: Lat Joor Ngoone Latiir Joop; French: Lat Dior Ngoné Latyr Diop; c. 1842–1886) was a nineteenth-century damel (king) of Cayor, a Wolof state that is today in Sénégal. He is today a national hero of Senegal for his resistance to French colonialism.

== Ancestry ==
Lat Jor was the son of Sahewer Sohna Mbay (Sakhéwère Sokhna Mbaye) and the Linguère royal Ngoné Latyr Fall (Ngoné Latyr Fall), Ngoné Latyr Fall was from the Wolof Dynasty of Paleen Dedd which ruled the two kingdoms of Cayor and Baol. Lat Jor belonged to the Geej or Guedj Wolof maternal dynasty that had supplied many of the rulers of Cayor and Baol over the preceding centuries. The matriarch of that matriclan was the Wolof Lingeer Ngoné Dièye, a Princess from Tubé Dieye in Gandiol. Gandiol is a Wolof region in the north of Senegal that borders Mauritania. Lat Jor was a direct maternal descendant of Lingeer Ngoné Dièye of Tubé Dieye.

Eligible to be elected based on his maternal lineage, Lat Jor was the first damel who was not from the 'Fall' family on his paternal side, being a 'Diop' instead.

== Early life ==
Information on Lat Jor's life before his election as damel is known mostly through oral histories kept by griots. He was born in 1842 in Keur Amadou Yalla in northeastern Cayor. Raised in a nominally Muslim milieu, he studied at a Quranic school as a child. In 1859 at age 17 he was already involved in politics.

== First Reign as Damel ==
The damel Majojo (or Ma-Dyodyo) was installed in 1861 by the French. His opponents resisted, defeating the damel in battle the next year and installing the young Lat Jor in his place. After fighting a rearguard action at the battle of Ndari in early December 1863, Lat Jor crushed Majojo and his French allies in the battle of Ngolgol later that month. In January 1864, defeated at Loro, he was ultimately forced to flee Cayor. He tried unsuccessfully to find shelter with the kings of Sine and Saloum before turning to the marabout of Saloum, Maba Diakhou Bâ. Meanwhile, Louis Faidherbe deposed the ineffective Majojo, annexed Cayor, and divided it into five provinces.

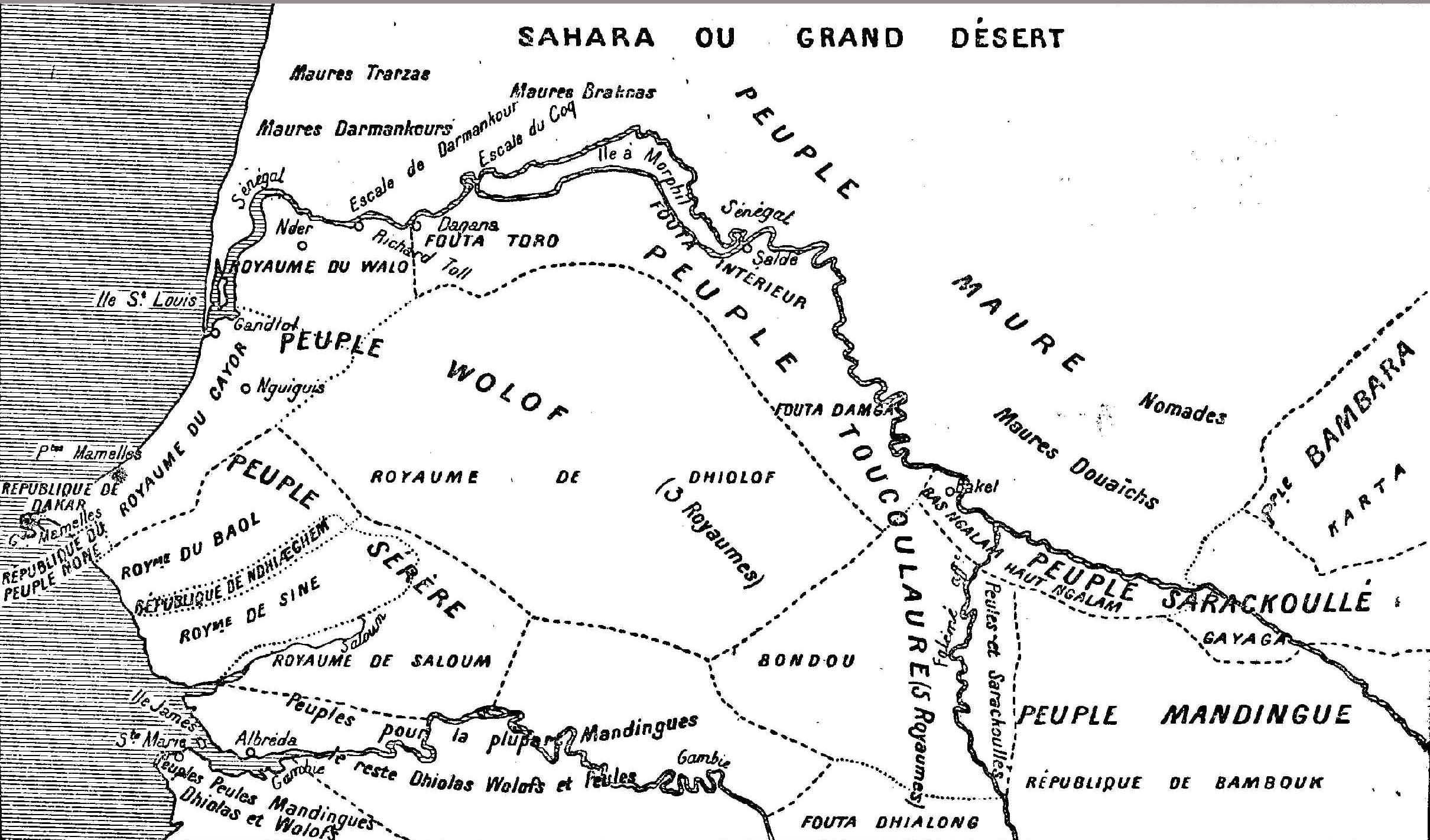
Senegalese states circa 1850. Cayor is at left, center.

== Alongside Maba ==
In order to cement his alliance with Maba, Lat Jor formally became of the cleric's talibes, or disciples. This was an important break from Cayor's relatively secular royal traditions. He remained a practicing Muslim for the rest of his life.

Lat Jor led Maba's armies, reinforced with his ceddo warriors, in the conquests of the states of Baol and Djolof in July 1865. An alarmed French governor Émile Pinet-Laprade marched on Saloum at the head of 1,600 regulars, 2,000 cavalry, and 4,000 volunteers and footsoldiers. At the Battle of Pathé Badiane outside of Nioro, however, the marabout forces drove the French back towards their fortifications at Kaolack. They couldn't, however, conquer the Serer Kingdom of Sine and were defeated at The Battle of Fandane-Thiouthioune (18 July 1867) by Maad a Sinig Kumba Ndoffene Famak Joof.

== Return to Cayor ==
In 1868 Lat Jor and his troops returned to Cayor to attempt to regain independence. He allied with Shaikh Amadou Ba and defeated the French in the battle of Mekhe on July 8th, 1869.

The French were unwilling to see Lat Jor ally himself to another powerful marabout leader, however. On 15th July 1870 they recognized him as Damel of Cayor, cementing this understanding with a treaty early in 1871. With Amadou Ba's ambitions in Cayor and Lat Jor's support for the exiled Jolof prince Alboury Ndiaye, their former alliance was broken. Over the next few years they clashed over control of Baol until Amadou Ba invaded Cayor in July 1874. His forces won a series of victories against Lat Jor and his allies, until the French intervened. With their reinforcement, particularly heavy artillery, Lat Jor won the bloody battle of Samba Sadio in February 1875 and Ba was killed.

Despite being the acknowledged Damel of Cayor, Lat Jor had to deal with a revolt among the jaami buur, or royal slaves. The Franco-Adjor alliance broke down in 1883 when Lat Jor began a rebellion to resist the construction of the Dakar to Saint-Louis railway. He is reported to have told the French Governor Servatius:

"As long as I live, be assured, I shall oppose, with all my might the construction of this railway."

In 1883 the Governor installed one of Lat Jor's nephews, Samba Lawbe Fall, in his place as Damel of a depopulated Cayor. For three years Lat Jor fought a guerilla war with a small band of followers. By 1886 the French had signed a peace with Alboury Ndiaye of Jolof, had completed the railroad, and were at their most powerful. Samba Lawbe Fall started a war with Jolof that violated a prior treaty with the French; at the ensuing negotiations, a fight broke out and he was killed on October 6, 1886. Maneuvered into a doomed battle at Dekhele in late December, Lat Jor was killed in action, and the kingdom of Cayor ceased to exist as an independent, united state.

== Legacy ==
Lat Jor remains to this day a national hero in Senegal. In Dakar, there is a giant statue of Maalaw, the legendary horse of Lat Jor, near the great mosque. The Senegalese Army's main camp in Dakar as well as a stadium in Thiès are named for him.

Faidherbe is reputed to have said of Lat Jor's troops: "Ceux-là, on les tue on ne les déshonore pas." ("They can be killed but not dishonored"). This has been adapted as the motto of the Senegalese Army: "On nous tue, on ne nous déshonore pas".

The Cayor ruling class, although always nominally Muslim, had historically been hostile to the stricter religious interpretations promoted by the marabouts. Lat Jor's initiation by Maba Diakhou Ba and his subsequent promotion of Islam when he retook the throne was an important factor in moving the Wolof population generally away from the earlier syncretic Islam and towards the faith as practiced by the clerics.

== Ancestry Chart of Lat Jor ==
Sahewer Fatma Cub (Bar-Get)
Medun Sohna Nyan (Bar-Get)
Sohna Nyan (?)
Sahewer Sohna Mbay Jop (Bar-Get)
Sohna Mbay (?)
Lat Jor Ngoné Latir (Damel-Teigne)
Lat-Degen Fari (Teigne)
Ma-Iseu Tend Jor Samba Fal (Damel-Teigne)
Jor Mahureja
Ngoné Latir Fal (Linguère)
Jam Jeumb
Absa Mbunum
Aisa Jop

== See also ==
- Cayor
- Jolof Empire
- History of Senegal
- Maissa Bigué Ngoné Fall
- Lingeer Ngoné Dièye
- Maad a Sinig Ama Joof Gnilane Faye Joof
- Maad a Sinig Mahecor Joof
