= Kingdom of Jolof =

West African rump state

Jolof Kingdom جولوف
- 1549–1890
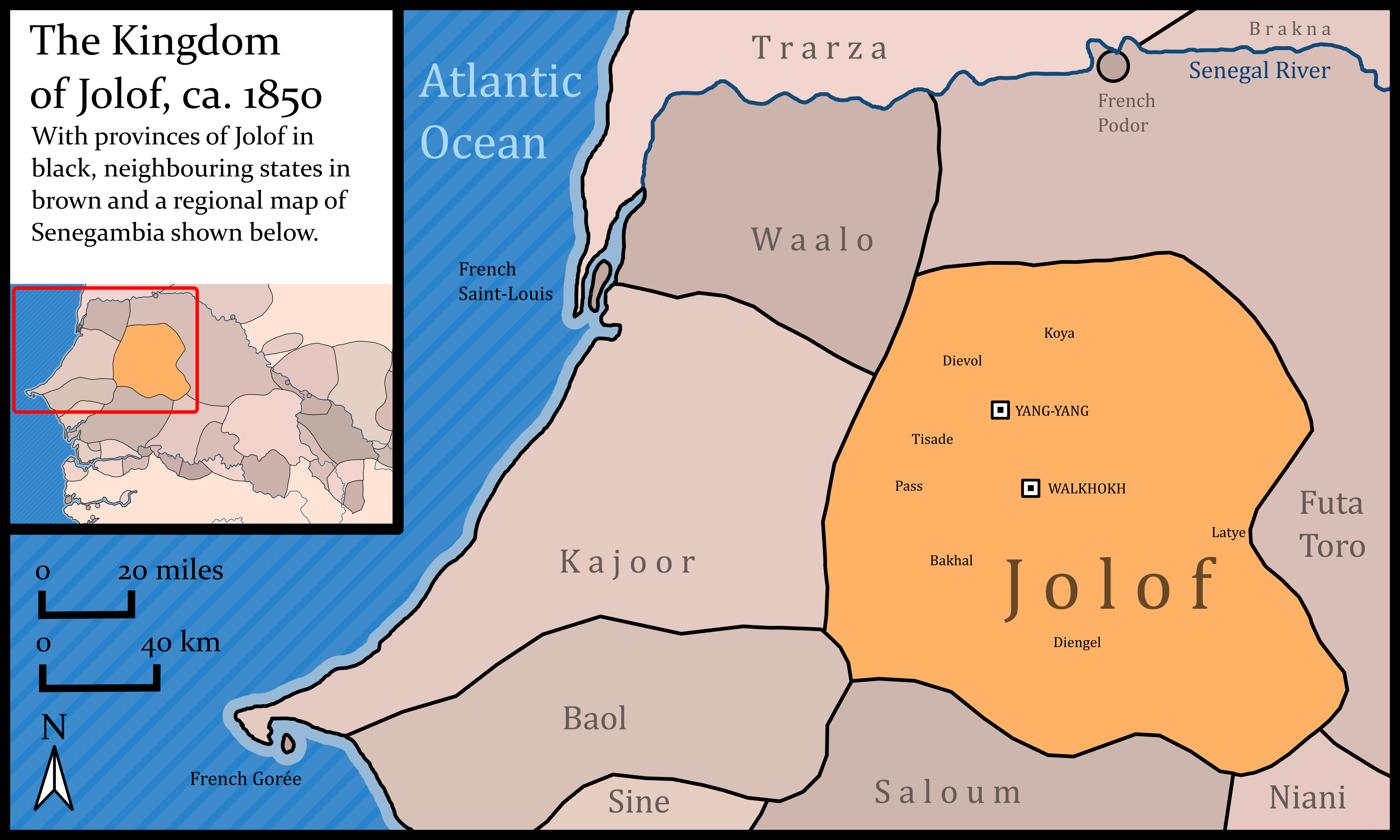
- Jolof ca. 1850
- Capital: Ouarkhokh, Yang-Yang
- Common languages: Wolof, Arabic
- Religion: Islam (19th Century), Animism
- Government: Monarchy
- Emperor (Buur-ba Jolof)
  - 1549-1566: al-Buri Penda
  - 1875-1890: Alboury N'Diaye
- Legislature: Jaaraf Jambure
- Historical era: Early Modern Period
  - Established: 1549
  - Evacuation of Jolof by Alboury Ndiaye and occupation by the French: 1890
Preceded by	Succeeded by
Jolof Empire	French West Africa

- People: Wolof
- Language: Wolof làkk
- Country: Jolof Empire (Kingdom)

The Kingdom of Jolof (Arabic: جولوف), also known as Wolof and Wollof, was a West African rump state located in what is today the nation of Senegal. For nearly two hundred years, the Wolof rulers of the Jolof Empire collected tribute from vassal kings' states who voluntarily agreed to the confederacy. At the 1549 Battle of Danki, however, the Buurba Jolof was defeated by the lord of Kayor, resulting in the rapid disintegration of the empire. Jolof survived as a rump state, unable to access the Atlantic trade between its former vassal territories and the Portuguese.

== History ==
The last Buurba of a united Jolof Empire, Leele Fuli Fak, was killed at Danki in 1549. His sons were children, and so their uncle Alboury became regent. He refused to yield power when they came of age, however, leading to a civil war where Giran Buri Jeleen defeated and killed him. With Jolof weakened, the Deniankes of Futa Toro made Jolof and Waalo their vassals, although this was largely nominal. The burbas of Jolof tried several times in the late 16th and early 17th century to reconquer Cayor, but were not successful, although they retained some of their imperial cachet and influence with their former vassals.

Biram Penda Tabara succeeded his uncle Giran, leading to a period of succession conflicts. During his reign, in 1670, a regional rebellion against the Wolof rulers of Senegambia broke out, led by Muslim clerics from Mauretania. He reputedly fought ten battles against the Muslims before finally driving them out of Jolof. The Mauritanians still remained a problem, however; Waalo in particular suffered from their constant raids.

=== Civil war ===
Biram Penda Tabara's death inaugurated a long period of civil war in Jolof. The electoral college chose his maternal half-brother Biram Mbaakure as Buurba, but a rival claimant, Bakar Penda Xole, exiled himself in Cayor with his supporters. With the support of the Damel and teigne (king) Lat Sukabe Fall, he marched on Jolof and killed Biram Mbaakure at the battle of Batal in 1693. Biram Penda Tabara's son, Bakar Kor Njaare, resisted this perceived outside invasion, however. He also exiled himself with his supporters, but upon his return he was defeated. An attack on Cayor also ended in defeat, and he died in exile in Waalo soon afterwards. Another claimant, Bakantam Ngaan, assassinated Bakar Penda Xole and was in turn crowned Buurba. His rule was short-lived, however. Alboury Jaxeer Lodo, a supporter of Bakar Kor Njaare, besieged Bakantam Ngaan in the capital of Ceng, captured the town, and killed him.

After his victory, Alboury Jaxeer moved the capital from Ceng, which had supported his rival, to the more loyal Warkhokh. Only two years into his reign, however, his rule was contested by his nephew Bira Yamb Majigeen Ndaw. Two battles, one at Warkhokh and one at Njabakundam, were indecisive. Alboury Jaxeer allied with the Damel of Cayor, but was nevertheless defeated in a third battle at Ndipa and forced into exile. The accession of Bira Yamb Ndaw marked the end of the period of civil war.

=== 19th century and the growing French presence ===
In the early 19th century, the Trarza Moors dominated the Senegal river valley through their monopoly on the lucrative trade in gum arabic. They frequently raided Jolof for slaves and booty until buurba Mba Buuri began paying an annual tribute around 1820, though raids restarted, and conflict intensified in the 1830s and 40s. During this period central rule was weak, but the bergel Makura Niang, dominating a series of buurbas, maintained order in the kingdom. Upon his death around 1848 Jolof was torn by succession disputes and foreign intervention until 1864.

In 1865 Maba Diakhou Bâ's forces led by Lat Jor invaded Jolof and drove buurba Bakantam Khadi, who had refused to convert to Islam, into exile in Bambouk. Maba was forced to retreat a few months later to deal with a revolt and French invasion in his base in Saloum, and the buurba returned, moving the capital to Yang-Yang, but was not able to fully restore order.

In 1870 another reformer, Shaikh Amadou Ba of the Imamate of Futa Toro, again tried to convince the buurba to convert. Ultimately, he succeeded in cowing the political leadership of the kingdom, Islamizing the state, and he settled there with his numerous followers.

=== Alboury Ndiaye ===
Resistance remained, however, led by the tuube Sanor Ndiaye and Alboury Ndiaye. After many setbacks, an alliance of Ndiaye, Lat Jor, Ibra Almaami of Futa Toro, and the French defeated and killed Amadou Ba in the battle of Samba Sadio on February 11, 1875. Alboury Ndiaye then became de facto buurba, with an elder uncle as a figurehead.

Ndiaye re-established firm royal control in Jolof, ended the frequent raiding, promoted trade and agricultural production, and continued the Islamization of the country. He supported his cousin Lat Jor in a dispute with the French over the construction of a railroad, creating tension temporarily resolved by a favorable treaty in 1885. In 1886 he defeated an invasion from Cayor by the damel installed by the French in place of Lat Jor in the battle of Gile. By 1890 Jolof was the only remaining independent kingdom in western Senegal, and Alboury Ndiaye was planning to evacuate much of the population eastwards away from French influence. To prevent this, a column led by Alfred Dodds marched on Yang-Yang in May, and Ndiaye moved eastwards across the Ferlo Desert to Futa Toro. Dodds installed a puppet buurba and officially established a protectorate over Jolof, ending its independence.

== Society ==
Jolof society was, like many of its neighbors, composed of three groups - the freeborn (including both nobles and peasants), the artisan castes, and slaves, which were around 15% of the population. Most slaves were captured in war or raids, and those born into slavery could not be sold. The economy was fundamentally agricultural, and Jolof was isolated from the growing commercial exchanges with European merchants on the coast.

For much of Jolof's history Islamic practice was deeply syncretized with pre-Islamic and animistic practices and the rulers and nobility were nominal Muslims at best. The marabout class was generally set apart, serving as providers of magical amulets and gri-gris as well as secretaries and priests for the nobility. The distinction between observant Muslim marabouts and quasi-pagan ceddos deepened over time and was at the heart of the religious conflicts of the 1860s.

== Government ==
The buurba, or king, was the head of state. He appointed from the royal family the tuube, who served as regent in the king's absence, and the buumi, who commanded a province and was the burba's presumed successor. The Lingeer, often the king's mother but sometimes his sister, ran the royal household and was the most powerful woman in the kingdom. Nobles with territorial commands were known as kangaame, and among these the most powerful and influential were the belep and bergel, each of whom ruled an important province on Jolof's borders and whose titles were hereditary.

The jaraaf jambuure was the council of nobles who elected new kings and advised them on all matters. Each caste and minority ethnicity also had a representative who served as an intermediary between them and the buurba. The ruler also controlled a force of slave soldiers which maintained order and formed the core of the kingdom's army. Succession generally went from uncle to nephew. This created endemic succession disputes that often led to civil wars and foreign interference, which the jaraaf jambuure was generally powerless to prevent.

== See also ==
- List of rulers of Jolof
- Cayor Kingdom
- History of Senegal
- History of the Gambia
- Wolof people
- Serer people
- Mali Empire
- Jolof Empire
- Anna Kingsley

== Sources ==
- Charles, Eunice A. (1977). Precolonial Senegal : the Jolof Kingdom, 1800-1890. Brookline, MA: African Studies Center, Boston University.
- Kane, Oumar (2004). La première hégémonie peule. Le Fuuta Tooro de Koli Teηella à Almaami Abdul. Paris: Karthala.
- Ndiaye, Bara (2021). "Le Jolof: Naissance et Evolution d'un Empire jusqu'a la fin du XVIIe siecle". In Fall, Mamadou; Fall, Rokhaya; Mane, Mamadou (eds.). Bipolarisation du Senegal du XVIe - XVIIe siecle (in French). Dakar: HGS Editions. pp. 166–236.
- Ogot, Bethwell A. (1999). General History of Africa V: Africa from the Sixteenth to the Eighteenth Century. Berkeley: University of California Press. ISBN 0-520-06700-2.
