= Fula people =

Ethnic group in the Sahel and West Africa

Fulani, Fula
Fulɓe 𞤊𞤵𞤤𞤩𞤫
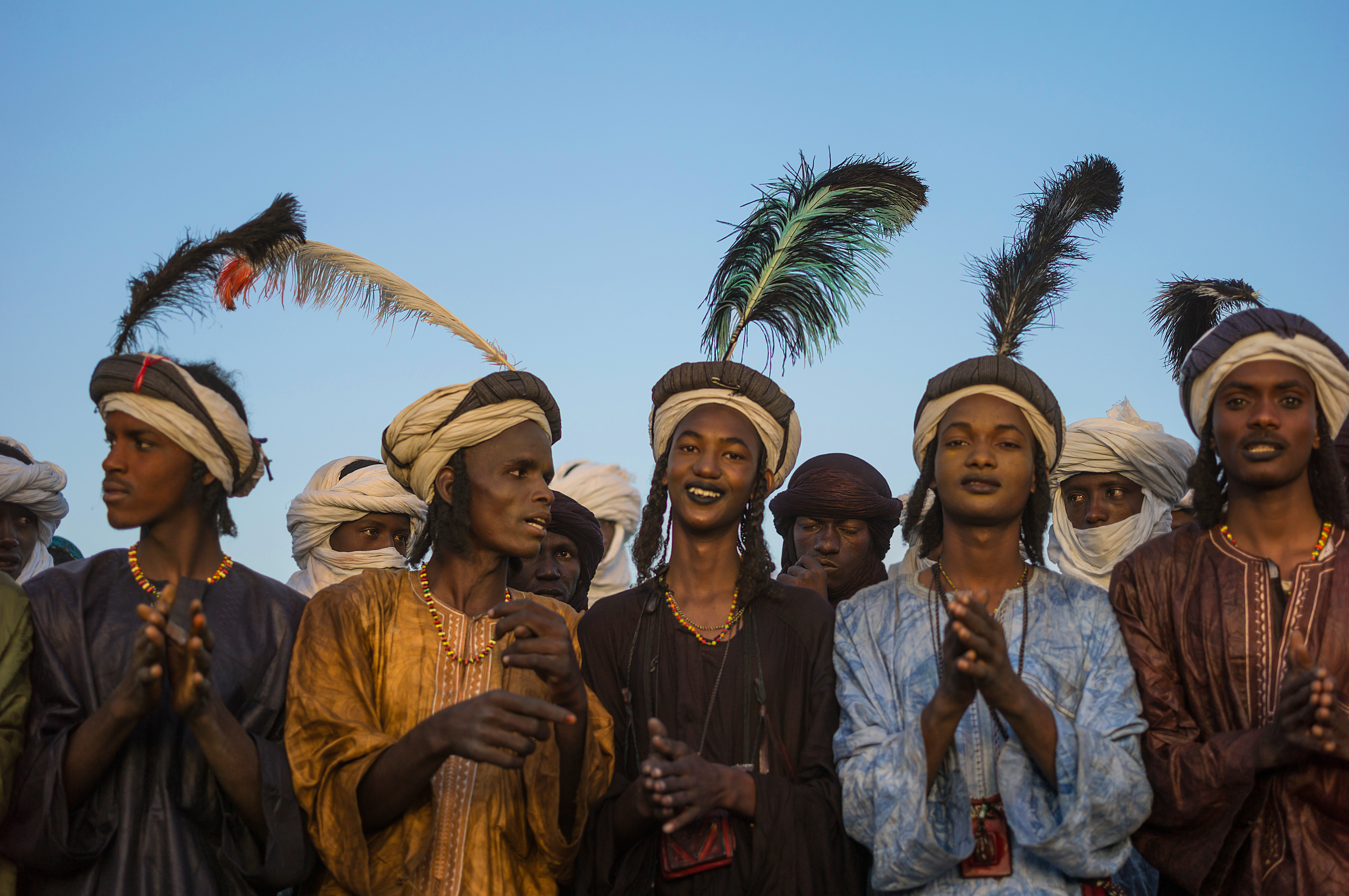
- Wodaabe Fulbe men during Guérewol in Niger

Total population
- est. 38.6 million

Regions with significant populations
- West Africa, North Africa, Central Africa
- Nigeria: 15,300,000 (6.6%)
- Senegal: 5,055,782 (27.5%)
- Guinea: 4,544,000 (33.4%)
- Cameroon: 3,000,000 (13.4%)
- Mali: 2,840,850 (13.3%)
- Burkina Faso: 1,800,000 (8.4%)
- Niger: 1,650,000 (6.5%)
- Benin: 1,182,900 (8.6%)
- Mauritania: 900,000 (18.3%)
- Guinea-Bissau: 623,646 (30%)
- Gambia: 449,280 (18.2%)
- Chad: 334,000 (1.8%)
- Sierra Leone: 310,000 (5%)
- CAR: 250,000 (4.5%)
- Sudan: 204,000 (0.4%)
- Togo: 110,000 (1.2%)
- Ghana: 4,240 (0.01%)
- Algeria: 4,000 (0.01%)
- Ivory Coast: 3,800 (0.02%)
- South Sudan: 3,000 (0.02%)

Languages
- Fula • French • Portuguese • English • Arabic • Hausa

Religion
- primarily Islam minority Christianity and Animism

Related ethnic groups
- Toucouleur, Hausa, Tebu, Serer, Songhai, Tuareg

- Person: Pullo 𞤆𞤵𞤤𞥆𞤮
- People: Fulɓe 𞤊𞤵𞤤𞤩𞤫
- Language: W: Pulaar 𞤆𞤵𞤤𞤢𞥄𞤪; E: Fulfulde 𞤊𞤵𞤤𞤬𞤵𞤤𞤣𞤫

The Fula people, Fulani people, or Fulɓe (Note: Fula: Fulɓe, 𞤊𞤵𞤤𞤩𞤫; French: Peul; Hausa: Fulani or Hilani; Kanuri: Fillata; Portuguese: Fula; Wolof: Pël; Bambara: Fulaw; Tyap: A̱fa̱taa) are an ethnic group in the Sahara, Sahel, and West Africa, widely dispersed across the region. Inhabiting many countries, they live mainly in West Africa and northern parts of Central Africa, South Sudan, Darfur, and regions near the Red Sea coast in Sudan. There are between 25 and 40 million Fulani worldwide.

A third of the Fula — 7 to 10 million — are pastoralists. They are the largest nomadic pastoral community in the world. Most Fula are semi-nomadic, plus settled farmers, scholars, artisans, merchants, and nobility. Ethnically, they share the Fula language, their history and their culture. The Fula are almost all Muslims, with a Christian minority or animists.

Many West African leaders are of Fulani descent, including the former President of Nigeria, Muhammadu Buhari; the first President of Cameroon Ahmadou Ahidjo; the former President of Senegal, Macky Sall; the President of Gambia, Adama Barrow; the former President of Guinea-Bissau, Umaro Sissoco Embaló; the Prime Minister of Guinea, Bah Oury; and the former Prime Minister of Mali, Boubou Cissé. They also occupy positions in major international institutions, such as the Deputy Secretary-General of the United Nations, Amina J. Mohammed; the 74th President of the United Nations General Assembly, Tijjani Muhammad-Bande; and the Secretary-General of OPEC, Mohammed Sanusi Barkindo.

== Names ==
=== Ethnonyms ===
There are many names (and spellings of the names) used in other languages to refer to the Fulɓe. Fulani in English is borrowed from the Hausa term. Fula, from the Manding languages, is also used in English, and sometimes spelled Fulah or Fullah. Fula and Fulani are commonly used in English, including within Africa. The French borrowed the Wolof term Pël, which is variously spelled: Peul, Peulh, and even Peuhl. More recently the Fulfulde / Pulaar term Fulɓe, which is a plural noun (singular, Pullo) has been Anglicised as Fulbe, which is gaining popularity in use. In Portuguese, the terms Fula or Futafula are used. The terms Fallata, Fallatah, or Fellata are of Arabic origins, and are often the ethnonyms by which Fulani people are identified by in parts of Chad and Sudan.

The Toucouleur people of the central Senegal River valley speak Fulfulde / Pulaar and refer to themselves as Haalpulaaren, or those who speak Pulaar. The supposed distinction between them was invented by French ethnographers in the 19th century who differentiated between supposedly sedentary, agricultural, fanatical, and anti-European Toucouleurs on one hand and nomadic, pastoralist, docile and cooperative Peulhs on the other, but the dichotomy is false.

=== Surnames ===
==== Guinea, Sierra Leone, Liberia, Gambia, Guinea-Bissau, Senegal ====
Common Fulani family names in Guinea, Sierra Leone, Liberia, Gambia, Guinea-Bissau, and Southern Senegal are: Diallo (French speaking regions), Jallow or Jalloh (English speaking regions), Djalo (Cap Verde and Guinea-Bissau), Sow, Barry, Bah or Ba, Baldé, and Diouldé. Other Fulani (Toucouleur) family names in Guinea and northern Senegal are: Tall, Sall, Diengue, Sy, Anne, Ly, Wann, Dia and others.

==== Nigeria, Niger, Cameroon ====
Although most Fulbe of Nigeria, Niger and Cameroon use their father's given name as surnames, there are some common Fulani last names such as Bello (likely from the Fulfulde word Ballo meaning "helper or assistant", this name is spread across several ethnic groups in Nigeria), Tukur (from Takrur), Gidado, Barkindo, Jallo, Ahidjo and Dikko.

==== Mali, Burkina Faso ====
In Mali, the most common Fulani family names are Diallo, Diakité, Dia, Sow, Sidibé, Sangaré, Bah, Dicko, Tall, etc. These names can be found among the Fulani populations of the following Malian regions and areas of Mopti, Macina, Nioro, Kidal, Tomboctou, Gao, Sikasso, and others. These names are also found among the Fula population of Burkina Faso, along with other names like Barry and Sankara (derived from Sangaré).

Bocoum, Niangadou, Bassoum, Daff, Djigué, and Lah are some family names that can be found among the Diawambe/Jawambe (Singular: Dianwando/Jawando and Diokoramé/Jokorameh in Bambara) of Mali. The Jawambe are a sub-group of Fulanis in Mali who are primarily known for trading.

In some parts of Mali, like Mopti, apart from the common Fula surnames like those previously mentioned, you will find surnames like Cissé and Touré. Though these names are commonly associated with the Manding tribes, some in Mali have adopted the Fula culture and language through centuries of coexistence, and thus now consider themselves as part of the Fula ethnic group. A notable example of this is Amadou Toumani Touré, the former president of Mali.

== Geographic distribution ==
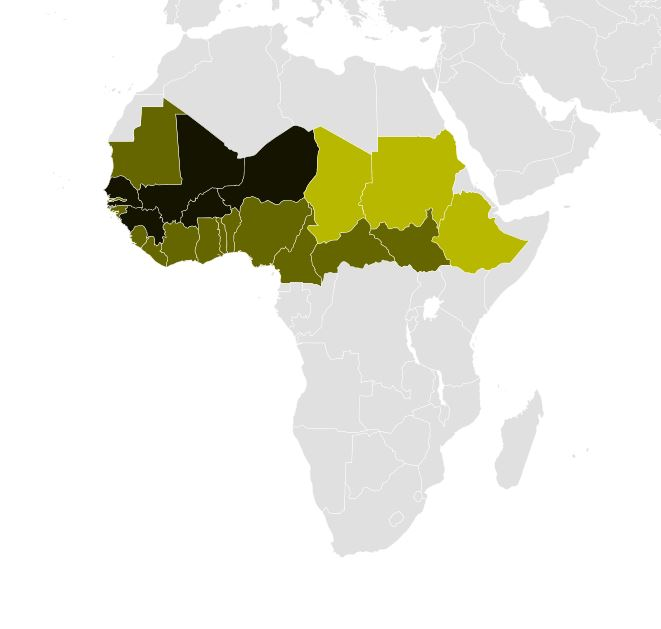
A distribution map of Fula people. Dark green: a major ethnic group; Medium: significant; Light: minor.

The Fula people are widely distributed, across the Sahel from the Atlantic coast to the Red Sea, particularly in West Africa. In addition, many also speak other languages of the countries they inhabit, making many Fulani bilingual or even trilingual. Such languages include French, Hausa, Bambara, Wolof, Soninke, and Arabic.

Major concentrations of Fulani people exist in the Fouta Djallon highlands of central Guinea and south into the northernmost reaches of Sierra Leone; the Futa Tooro savannah grasslands of Senegal and southern Mauritania; the Macina inland Niger river delta system around Central Mali; and especially in the regions around Mopti and the Nioro Du Sahel in the Kayes region; the Borgu settlements of Benin, Togo, and west-central Nigeria; the northern parts of Burkina Faso in the Sahel region's provinces of Seno, Wadalan, and Soum; and the areas occupied by the Sokoto Caliphate, which includes what is now southern Niger and northern Nigeria (such as Adamawa, Tahoua, Katsina, Sokoto, Kebbi, Zinder, Bauchi, Diffa, Yobe, Gombe, and further east, into the Benue River valley systems of north eastern Nigeria and northern Cameroon).

This is the area known as the Fombina/Hombina, literally meaning 'the south' in Adamawa Fulfulde, because it represented the most southern and eastern reaches of Fulɓe hegemonic dominance in West Africa. In this area, Fulfulde is the local lingua franca, and language of cross cultural communication. Further east of this area, Fulani communities become predominantly nomadic, and exist at less organized social systems.

These are the areas of the Chari-Baguirmi region and its river systems, in Chad and the Central African Republic, the Ouaddaï highlands of Eastern Chad, the areas around Kordofan, Darfur and the Blue Nile, Sennar, Kassala regions of Sudan, as well as the Red Sea coastal city of Port Sudan. The Fulani on their way to or back from the pilgrimage to Mecca, Saudi Arabia, settled in many parts of eastern Sudan, today representing a distinct community of over two million people referred to as the Fellata.

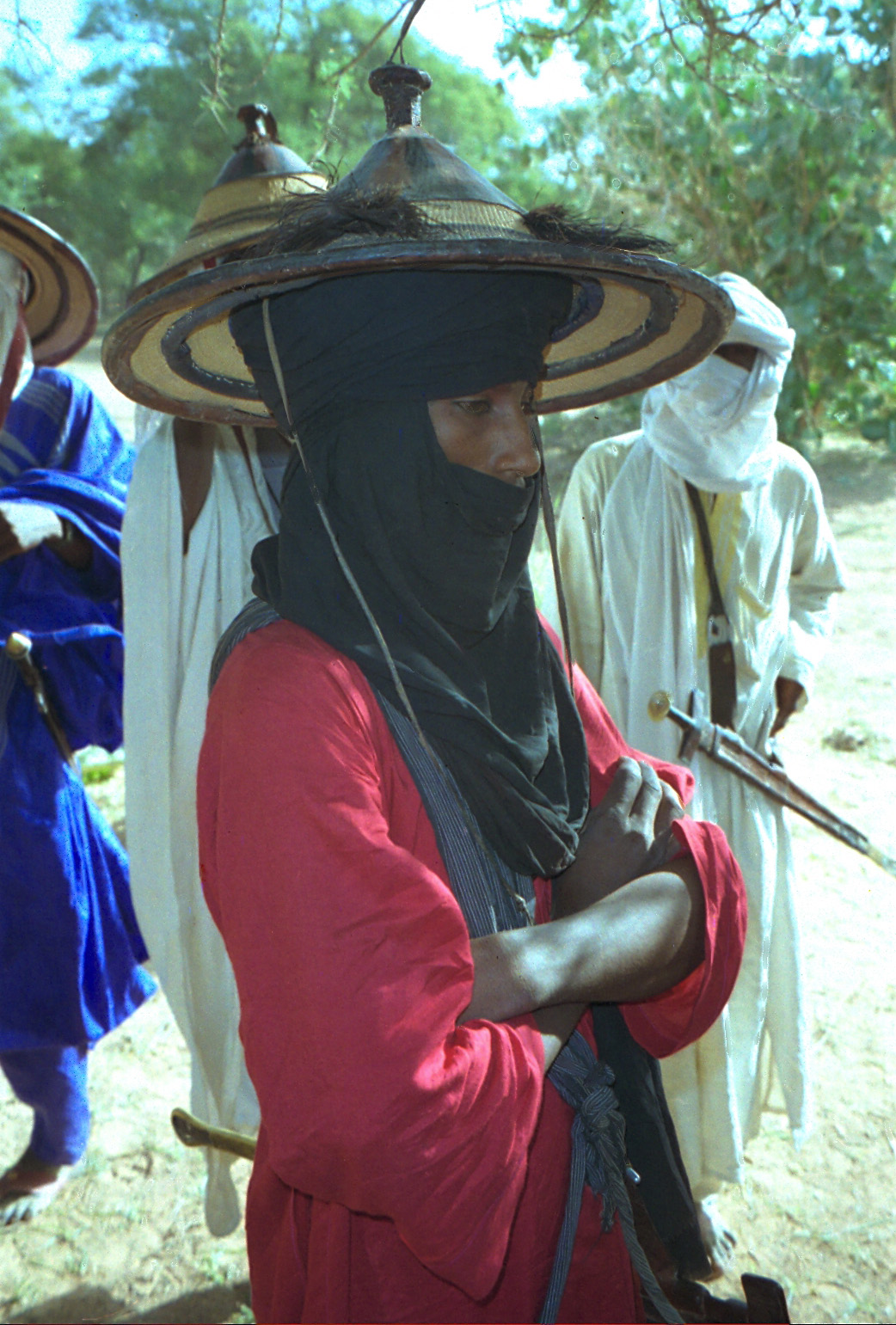
A Bodaado (singular of Wodaabe) Fula man with the typical Fulani hat above a turban

While their early settlements in West Africa were in the vicinity of the tri-border point of present-day Mali, Senegal, and Mauritania, they are now, after centuries of gradual migrations and conquests, spread throughout a wide band of West and Central Africa. The Fulani People occupy a vast geographical expanse located roughly in a longitudinal east–west band immediately south of the Sahara, and just north of the coastal rain forest and swamps. There are estimates of more than 25 million Fulani people.

There are generally three different types of Fulani based on settlement patterns, viz: the nomadic-pastoral or Mbororo, the semi-nomadic, and the settled or "town" Fulani. The pastoral Fulani move around with their cattle throughout the year. Typically, they do not stay around for long stretches (not more than 2–4 months at a time). The semi-nomadic Fulani can either be Fulɓe families who happen to settle down temporarily at particular times of the year or Fulɓe families who do not "browse" around past their immediate surroundings, and even though they possess livestock, they do not wander away from a fixed or settled homestead not too far away, they are basically "in-betweeners".

Settled Fulani live in villages, towns, and cities permanently and have given up nomadic life completely, in favor of an urban one. These processes of settlement, concentration, and military conquest led to the existence of organized and long-established communities of Fulani, varying in size from small villages to towns.

Today, some major Fulani towns include: Labé, Pita, Mamou, and Dalaba in Guinea; Kaedi, Matam and Podor, Kolda in Senegal and Mauritania; Bandiagara, Mopti, Dori, Gorom-Gorom, and Djibo in Mali and Burkina Faso, on the bend of the Niger; and Birnin Kebbi, Katsina, Gombe, Yola, Digil, Jalingo, Bauchi, Misau, Jama'are, Mayo Belwa, Mubi, Maroua, Ngaoundere, Azare, Dukku, Kumo, Girei, Damaturu, Bertoua, and Garoua in the countries of Cameroon and Nigeria. In most of these communities, the Fulani are usually perceived as a ruling class.

Fulani communities are sometimes grouped and named based on the areas they occupy. Although within each region, there are even further divisions and sub-groupings as well. Below is a list of the main Fulɓe groups.

Main Fulani sub-groups, national and subnational locations, cluster group and dialectal variety
Fulbe Adamawa 𞤊𞤵𞤤𞤩𞤫 𞤀𞤣𞤢𞤥𞤢𞤱𞤢	Nigeria: Adamawa State, Taraba State, Borno State, Yobe State; Cameroon: Adamawa region, Northern region, Far North region, Centre region; Chad: Mayo-Kebbi Est, Mayo-Kebbi Ouest region, Logone Oriental, Logone Occidental Etc.; Central African Republic: Nana-Mambéré, Ouham-Pendé, Mambéré-Kadéï; Sudan	Fulfulde Adamawa (Fombinaare)	Eastern
Fulbe Bagirmi 𞤊𞤵𞤤𞤩𞤫 𞤄𞤢𞤺𞤭𞤪𞤥𞤭	Central African Republic; Chad: Chari Bagirmi region, Mandoul region, Moyen Chari	Fulfulde Adamawa (Fombinaare)	Eastern
Fulbe Sokoto 𞤊𞤵𞤤𞤩𞤫 𞤅𞤮𞤳𞤮𞤼𞤮	Nigeria: Sokoto State, Kebbi State, Katsina State, Kano State, Zamfara State, Jigawa State, Niger State, Kwara State; Niger: Tahoua region, Maradi region, Dosso region, Zinder region	Fulfulde Sokoto (Woylaare)	Eastern
Fulbe Gombe 𞤊𞤵𞤤𞤩𞤫 𞤘𞤮𞤲'𞤦𞤫	Nigeria: Gombe State, Bauchi State, Yobe State, Borno State, Plateau State	Fulfulde Woylaare-Fombinaare transitional	Eastern
Fulbe Mbororo 𞤊𞤵𞤤𞤩𞤫 𞤐'𞤄𞤮𞤪𞤮𞤪𞤮	Nigeria: All across the northern, central and some southern states of the country as transient herders; Cameroon: All over the country in 9 of the country's 10 regions/provinces as transient herders; Chad: All across southern and central Chad as herders; Central African Republic: Ubiquitous across the countryside; Niger: All across the country south of the Sahara as herders and nomads. Note that the Woɗaaɓe are themselves an even smaller subgroup of the Mbororo'en. Thus: All Woɗaaɓe are Bororos, but not every Bororo is a Boɗaaɗo (Woɗaaɓe person); Sudan	Fulfulde Sokoto (Woylaare) & Adamawa (Fombinaare)	Eastern
Fulbe Borgu 𞤊𞤵𞤤𞤩𞤫 𞤄𞤮𞤪𞤺𞤵	Nigeria: Niger State, Kebbi State, Kwara State; Benin: Borgou, Atakora, Alibori, Donga; Togo: Savanes region, Kara region, Centrale region	Fulfulde Borgu & Jelgoore	Central
Fulbe Jelgooji 𞤊𞤵𞤤𞤩𞤫 𞤔𞤫𞤤𞤺𞤮𞥅𞤶𞤭	Mali; Niger: Tillabéri region, Dosso region; Burkina Faso: Sahel Region, Est region, Centre-Nord region, all across the country, most especially in the countryside	Fulfulde Jelgoore & (Massinakoore)	Central
Fulbe Massina 𞤊𞤵𞤤𞤩𞤫 𞤃𞤢𞤧𞥆𞤭𞤲𞤢	Mali: Mopti region, Gao region, Ségou region, all over the country; Ivory Coast: Mostly concentrated in the Northern regions; Ghana: in the northern and central regions	Fulfulde Massinakoore	Central
Fulbe Nioro 𞤊𞤵𞤤𞤩𞤫 𞤻𞤮𞥅𞤪𞤮	Mali: Kayes region, Koulikoro region; Senegal: Tambacounda region; Mauritania: Assaba region	Pulaar – Fulfulde Fuua Tooro -Massinakoore transitional	Western
Fulbe Futa Jallon 𞤊𞤵𞤤𞤩𞤫 𞤊𞤵𞥅𞤼𞤢 𞤔𞤢𞤤𞤮𞥅	Guinea: Labé region, Mamou region, Boké region, Kindia region, Faranah region, Conakry, all across the country as traders and merchants; Guinea-Bissau: Gabú region, Tombali region, Bafatá region; Sierra Leone: North-West, Northern Province, Western Area, all across the country's major urban centres as a trading population; Mali: Extreme southwest of country in the Kéniéba Cercle	Pular Fuuta Jallon	Western
Fulbe Futa Tooro 𞤊𞤵𞤤𞤩𞤫 𞤊𞤵𞥅𞤼𞤢 𞤚𞤮𞥅𞤪𞤮	Senegal: Matam region, Saint-Louis region, Louga region, Tambacounda region, Kaffrine region, all over the country; Mauritania: Trarza region, Gorgol region, Guidimaka region, Brakna region, Nouakchott	Pulaar Fuuta Tooro	Western
Fulbe Fuladu 𞤊𞤵𞤤𞤩𞤫 𞤊𞤵𞤤𞤢𞤣𞤵	Senegal: Kolda region, Sédhiou region, South of Tambacounda region; Guinea-Bissau: Gabu region, Bafatá region, Oio region; Gambia: All across the country	Pulaar – Pular Fuuta Tooro – Fuuta Jallon transitional	Western

In Ghana, the exact number of Fulani is unknown due to systematic oppression that includes not counting the Fulani in the Ghanaian census. This reflects widespread discrimination and negative stereotypes about the Fulani.

== History ==
=== Origins ===
The origins of the Fulani people are unclear and various theories have been postulated. As a nomadic herding people, they have moved through and among many cultures, making it difficult to trace their relationships and history with other peoples. Speculations about their origins started in the era of European conquest and colonization because of their oftentimes fair skin, wavy long hair and facial features.

Some Fulani oral histories, like other Muslim groups, suggest that their origins lie in Egypt or the Middle East. Others hold Futa Tooro as their homeland, which is supported by linguistic evidence.

In 2025, genetic studies revealed that the Fulani have ancestral components from isolated pastoral populations of North African descent dating back to the Saharan Green Period, which occurred between 5,000 and 12,000 years ago, explaining their higher proportion of Western Eurasian ancestry.

=== Early Kingdoms ===
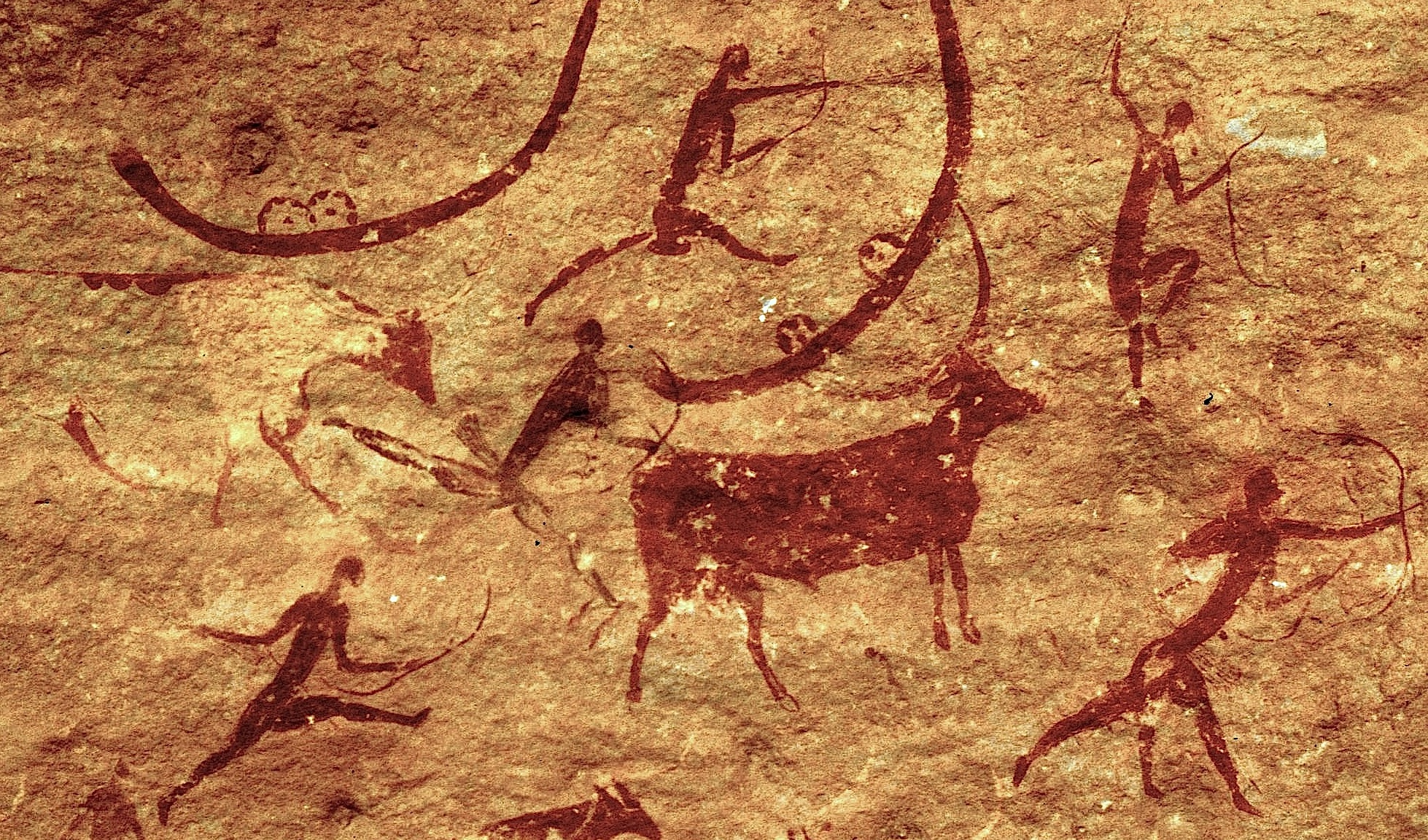
Tassili n'Ajjer rock art

The precursors of the Fulani likely migrated out of the Sahara desert, likely from Western Sahara, at the time much wetter than today, as it progressively dried beginning in the 7th century BC. They migrated into the Senegal river valley from the east, pushed by Berber raids and desertification.

The kingdom of Tekrur in what is now Futa Toro was formed through the interaction of the Fula, and perhaps Berber migrants with the native "Negro agricultural peoples" of the valley who were "essentially Serer". Dominated first by Wagadu and later by the Lamtuna, the Mali Empire, and the Jolof Empire, in the early 16th century the area was conquered by Koli Tenguella, who founded the Empire of Great Fulo.

=== Migration ===
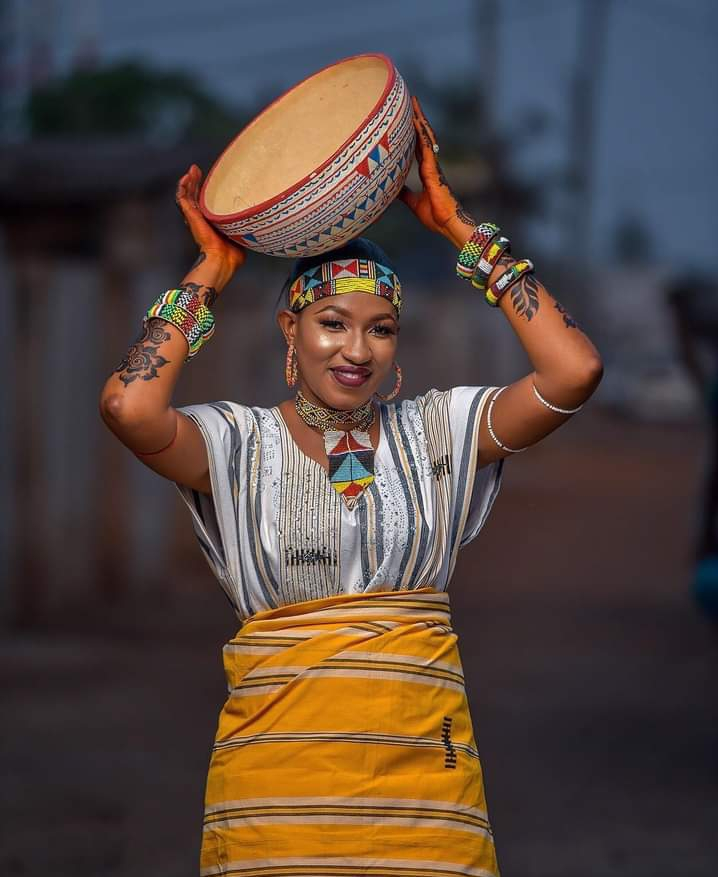
A Ghanaian Fulani wedding bride

The Fulani were cattle-keeping farmers who shared their lands with other nearby groups, like the Soninke, who contributed to the rise of ancient Ghana, with eastward and westward expansion being led by nomadic groups of cattle breeders or the Fulɓe ladde. While the initial expansionist groups were small, they soon increased in size due to the availability of grazing lands in the Sahel and the lands that bordered it to the immediate south.

Agricultural expansions led to a division among the Fulani, where individuals were classified as belonging either to the group of expansionist nomadic agriculturalists or the group of Fulani who found it more comfortable to abandon traditional nomadic ways and settle in towns or the Fulɓe Wuro. Fulani towns were a direct result of nomadic heritage and were often founded by individuals who had simply chosen to settle in a given area instead of continuing on their way.

Evidence of Fulani migration as a whole, from the Western to Eastern Sudan is very fragmentary. Delafosse, one of the earliest enquirers into Fulani history and customs, principally relying on oral tradition, estimated that Fulani migrants left Fuuta-Tooro heading east between the eleventh and the fourteenth centuries. By the 15th century, there was a steady flow of Fulɓe immigrants into Hausaland and, later on, Bornu. Their presence in Baghirmi was recorded early in the 16th century.

By the end of the 18th century, Fulani settlements were dotted all along the Benue River valley and its tributaries. They spread eastwards towards Garoua and Rey Bouba, and southwards towards the Faro River, to the foot of the Mambilla Plateau, which they would later ascend in subsequent years. The heaviest concentrations of their settlements were at Gurin, Chamba territory, Cheboa, Turua and Bundang.

Today, Fula oral historians recognize three different Fuuta, or Fula lands: Fuuta Kingi, meaning 'Old Fuuta', encompassing the Tagant Plateau, the Assaba Region, the Hodh, Futa Toro and the area around Nioro du Sahel; Fuuta Keyri, 'New Fuuta', includes Futa Djallon, Massina, Sokoto, and the Adamawa Region; Fuuta Jula is the diaspora of Fula traders and emigrants in other regions.

=== Islam and the Fula Jihads ===
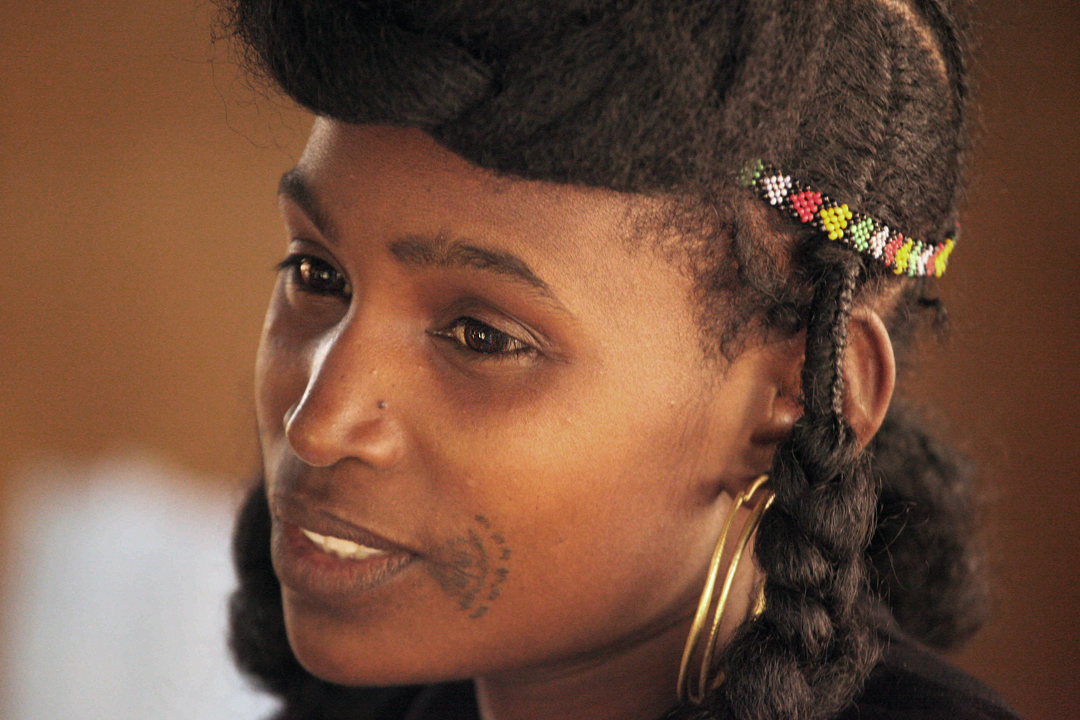
Fulani woman from Niger

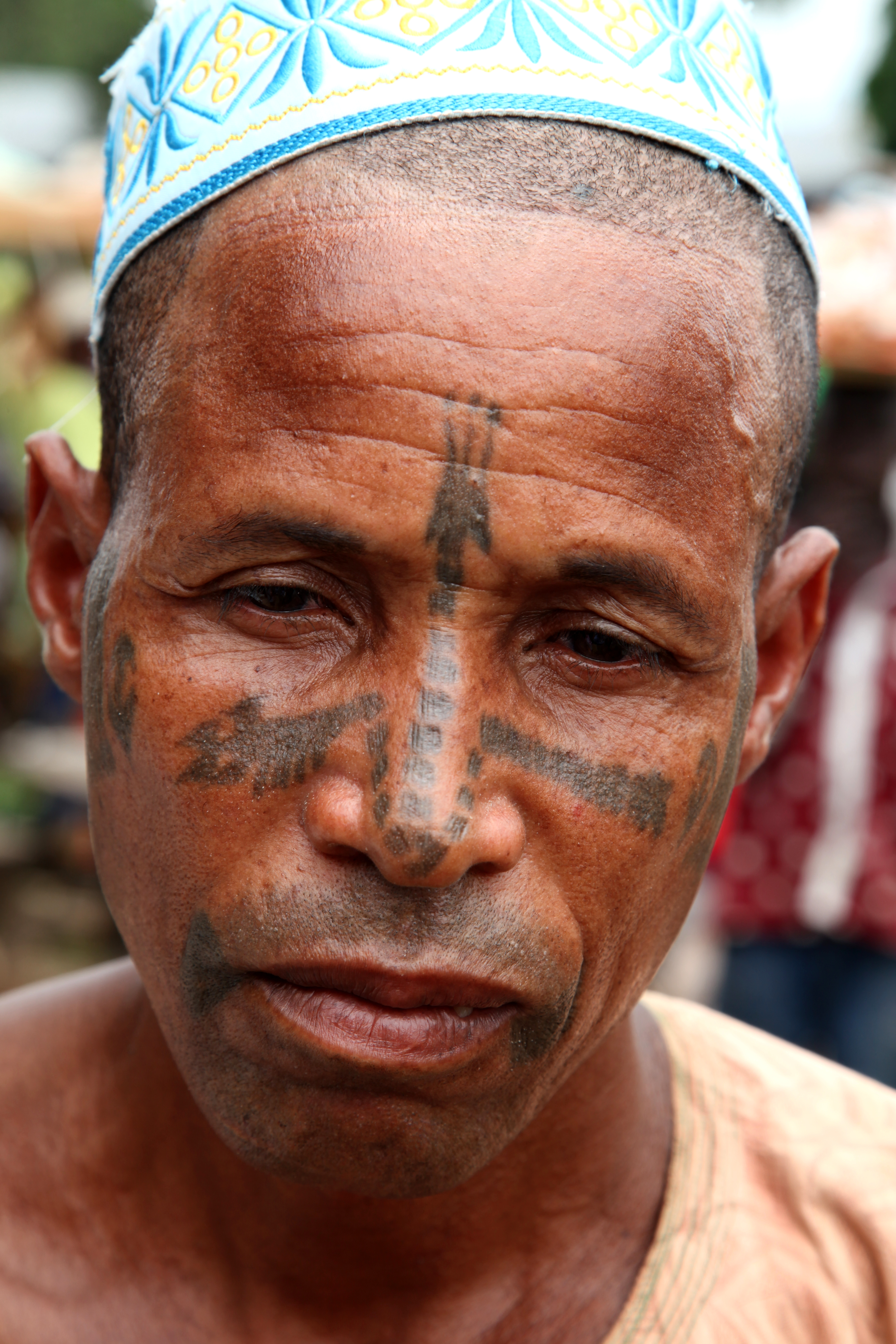
Nigerian Fulani man with traditional marks

The Fula, living on the edge of the Sahara, were among the first sub-Saharan groups to adopt Islam. According to David Levison, adopting Islam made the Fulani feel a "cultural and religious superiority to surrounding peoples, and that adoption became a major ethnic boundary marker" between them and other African ethnic groups in the Sahel and West Africa.

Armed with horses and weapons from the north and inspired by Fula, Berber and Arab clerics, Fulani political units played a central role in promoting Islam in West Africa through peaceful and violent means. These jihads targeted other ethnic groups and other Fulani who had not yet adopted Islam or who follows it too loosely. These wars helped the Fula dominate much of the Sahel region of West Africa during the medieval and pre-colonial era, establishing them as a religious group and also as a political and economic force. From the 18th century onwards, the frequency of jihads increased and the Fulani became politically dominant in many areas.

While establishing their hegemony, the Fulbe defined a strict social hierarchy and imposed limitations on economic and trading activities, the purpose of which was to ensure a constant flow of tax revenue and commodities to the state apparatus and the standing army, especially for the cavalry. The freedom for pastoralists to move around was curtailed to ensure the smooth functioning of other production activities, such as cereal cultivation and, in the case of Maasina, of fishing activities. There was considerable resistance to the forced acceptance of Islam. Conversion to Islam meant not only changing one's religion but also submitting to rules dealing with every aspect of social, political and cultural life, intrusions with which many nomadic Fulbe were not comfortable.

==== Bundu ====
In 1690, Torodbe cleric Malick Sy came to Bundu, in what is now eastern Senegal, from his home near Podor. Sy settled the lands with relatives from his native Futa Toro and Muslim immigrants from as far west as the Djolof Empire and as far east as Nioro du Sahel.

Under Sy, Bundu became a refuge for Muslims and Islamic scholars persecuted by traditional rulers in other kingdoms. Sy was killed in 1699 caught in an ambush by the army of Gajaaga. Still, Bundu's growth that would set a precedent for later, larger, and more disruptive Fula jihads.

==== Imamate of Futa Jallon ====
The Emirate / Imamate of Timbo in the Fuuta Jallon developed from a revolt by Islamic Fulɓe against their oppression by the pagan Pulli (فُلِی or 𞤆𞤵𞤤𞥆𞤭, non-Islamic Fulɓe), and the Jallonke (the original Mande inhabitants of the Fuuta-Jallon), during the first half of the 18th century. The first ruler took the title of Almaami and resided in Timbo, near the modern-day town of Mamou. The town became the political capital of the newly formed Imamate, with the religious capital was located in Fugumba. The Council of Elders of the Futa Jallon state were also based in Fugumba, acting as a brake on the Almami's powers.

The newly formed imamate was mostly located mainly in present-day Guinea, but also spanned parts of modern-day Guinea-Bissau, Senegal, and Sierra Leone. This emirate was, in fact, a federal state of nine provinces: Timbo, Fugumbaa, Ɓuuriya, Koyin, Kollaaɗe, Keebaali, Labe, Fode-Hajji, and Timbi. After the Muslim Fulɓe victory, other ethnic groups who had resisted the jihad were deprived of their rights to land except for a small piece for their subsistence and were reduced to servitude. The nomad Pulli Fulɓe lost all freedom of movement, and thus, began to settle en-masse. The Jalonke lost their noble status and became slaves (maccuɓe).

Later, due to strife between two branches of the Seediayanke royal lineage, (the Soriya and the Alphaya), a system for the rotation of office between these branches was set up. This led to an almost permanent state of civil strife since none of the parties was inclined to respect the system, which considerably weakened the power of the political centre.

==== Imamate of Futa Toro ====
A jihad in Futa Toro between 1769 and 1776 led by Sulayman Bal threw out the ruling Denianke Dynasty. Sulayman died in 1776 and was succeeded by Abdul Kader ('Abd al-Qadir), a learned teacher and judge who had studied in Cayor.

Abdul Kader became the first Almamy of the theocratic Almamyate of Futa Toro. He encouraged construction of mosques, and pursued an aggressive policy towards his neighbors. The Torodbe prohibited the trade in slaves on the river. In 1785 they obtained an agreement from the French to stop trading in Muslim slaves and to pay customs duties to the state. Abdul Kader defeated the emirates of Trarza and Brakna to the north, but was defeated and captured when he attacked the Wolof states of Cayor and Waalo around 1797. After his release the jihad impetus had been lost. By the time of Abdul Kader's death in 1806 the state was dominated by a few elite Torodbe families.

==== Sokoto Caliphate and its various emirates ====
The Sokoto Caliphate was by far the largest and most successful legacy of Fulani power in Western Africa. It was the largest, as well as the most well-organized, of the Fulani Jihad states. Throughout the 19th century, Sokoto was one of the largest and most powerful empires in West Africa until 1903, when defeated by European colonial forces. The Sokoto Caliphate included several emirates, the largest of which was Adamawa, although the Kano Emirate was the most populated. Others included, but are not limited to: Gombe Emirate, Gwandu Emirate, Bauchi Emirate, Katsina Emirate, Zazzau Emirate, Hadejia Emirate, and Muri Emirate.

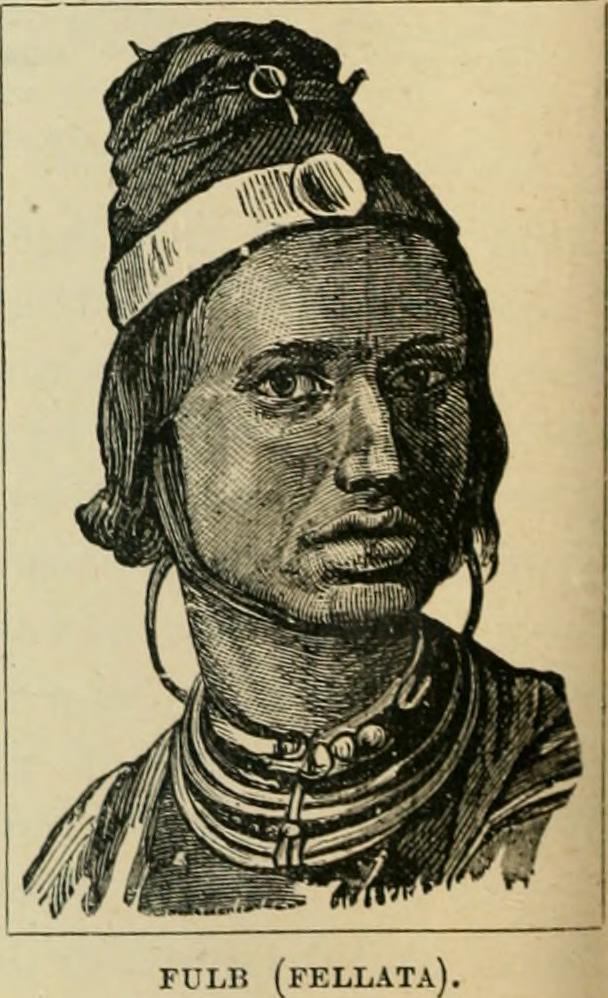
A depiction of a Fulani man from the Sokoto Caliphate by G.T. Bettany (1888)

==== Empire of Massina ====
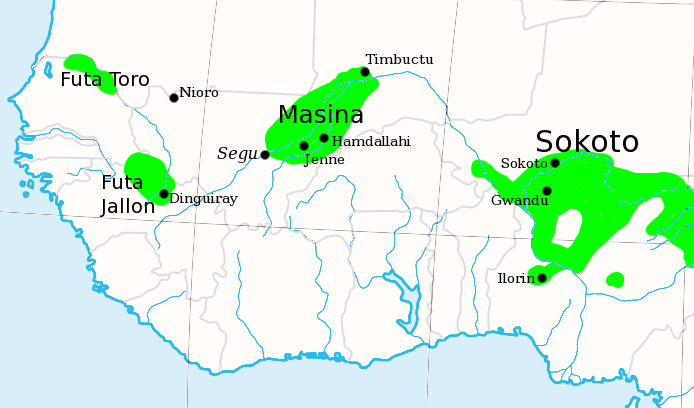
Fula people have helped form several historic Islamic theocracies and led many Jihad states, such as the 19th-century Masina.

The Maasina Emirate was established by the Fulbe jihad led by Seku Amadu in 1818, rebelling against the Bamana Empire, a political power that controlled the region from Segou. This jihad was inspired by Usman Dan Fodio and his jihad in Sokoto. This state appears to have had tight control over its core area, as evidenced by the fact that its political and economic organization is still manifested today in the organization of agricultural production in the Inland Delta. Despite its power and omnipresence, the hegemony of the emirate was constantly threatened. During the reign of Aamadu Aamadu, the grandson of Sheeku Aamadu, internal contradictions weakened the emirate until it fell to the Toucouleur in 1862.

==== Toucouleur Empire ====
The founder of the Toucouleur Empire, El Hadj Umar Tall, was an Islamic reformer originating from Fuuta Tooro. Beginning in Futa Jallon, he led an army that conquered Massina, Segou, and Kaarta, but he died fighting against rebels in 1864. At that point the emirate was divided into three states, each ruled by one of his sons. These three states had their capitals respectively in the towns of Nioro, Segou and Bandiagara. Within 30 years, all three had been conquered and colonized by the French.

=== Timeline of Fulani history ===
Time	Events
4th century	The Ghana Empire emerges in modern-day southeastern Mauritania and western Mali, as the first large-scale Sudano-Sahelian empire
5th century	The Ghana Empire becomes the most important power in West Africa
5th century (?)	The Fulbe migrate southwards and Eastwards from present-day Morocco and Mauritania
9th century	Takrur founded on the lower Senegal River (present-day Senegal) upon the influx of Fulani from the east and north settling in the Senegal River valley
11th century	Kingdoms of Tekruur and the Gao Empire flourish in West Africa due to gold trade
1042	Almoravids, Berber Muslims from southern Morocco and Mauritania, attack Takrur, after defeating the Sanhaja in 1039
1050s	Islam gains a strong foothold in West Africa
1050–1146	Almoravids take over Morocco, Algeria, and part of al-Andalus; they invade Ghana in 1076 and establish power there.
1062	Almoravids found capital at Marrakesh
1100	The Empire of Ghana starts to decline in influence and importance
1147	The Almohad Caliphate, ruled by Berber Muslims opposed to the Almoravids, seize Marrakesh and go on to conquer Almoravid Spain, Algeria, and Tripoli
1150	An unprecedented resurgence of the Ghana Empire sees it reach its height, controlling vast areas of western Africa as well as Saharan trade routes in gold and salt
1200	Empire and themselves set out on a road of conquest, they take its capital Koumbi Saleh in 1203
1235	Great warrior leader Sundiata Keita of the Mandinka people founds the Mali Empire in present-day Mali, West Africa; it expands under his rule
1240–1250	Mali absorbs Ghana, Tekruur
1324	10th Emperor of Mali, Musa I of Mali regarded as the richest individual in recorded history, goes on his famous pilgrimage to Mecca, Saudi Arabia. his procession reported to include 18,000 workers who each carried 4 pounds (1.8 kg) gold bars, heralds dressed in silks who bore gold staffs, organized horses and handled bags. Musa provided all necessities for the procession, feeding the entire company of men and animals. Also in the train were 80 camels, which varying reports claim carried between 50 and 300 pounds (23 and 136 kg) of gold dust each
1325	The Empire of Mali reaches its height of power, covering much of Northern West Africa.
1352	Ibn Battuta, Berber scholar, travels across Africa and writes an account of all he sees
1462	Sonni Ali becomes ruler of the Songhai people and goes on to build the Songhai Empire
1490	The Mali empire is overshadowed by the Songhai Empire
16th century	Songhai Empire enters a period of massive expansion and power under Askia Mohammad I. Askia Mohammad strengthened his country and made it the largest contiguous territory ever in West African history. At its peak, the Empire encompassed the Hausa states as far as Kano (in present-day Nigeria) and much of the territory that had belonged to the Songhai empire in the west neighbouring Bornu Empire of the Kanuri
1515	The Songhai Empire reaches its zenith and pinnacle of power
1590	Songhai Empire is defeated by invading Moroccans from further North
1650	Another wave of Fulbe migrations sees them penetrate even further in the Southern Senegal and Fouta Jallon highlands of middle Guinea
1670	Fulani people gain control of Bhundu in Senegal with Malick Sy, and the Sissibhe
1673	First unsuccessful Fulani jihad in the Fuuta Tooro
1808	Bornu successfully repel Fulani forces
1893	The French conquer the Fouta-Toro
1903	The British conquer the Sokoto Caliphate

== Society ==
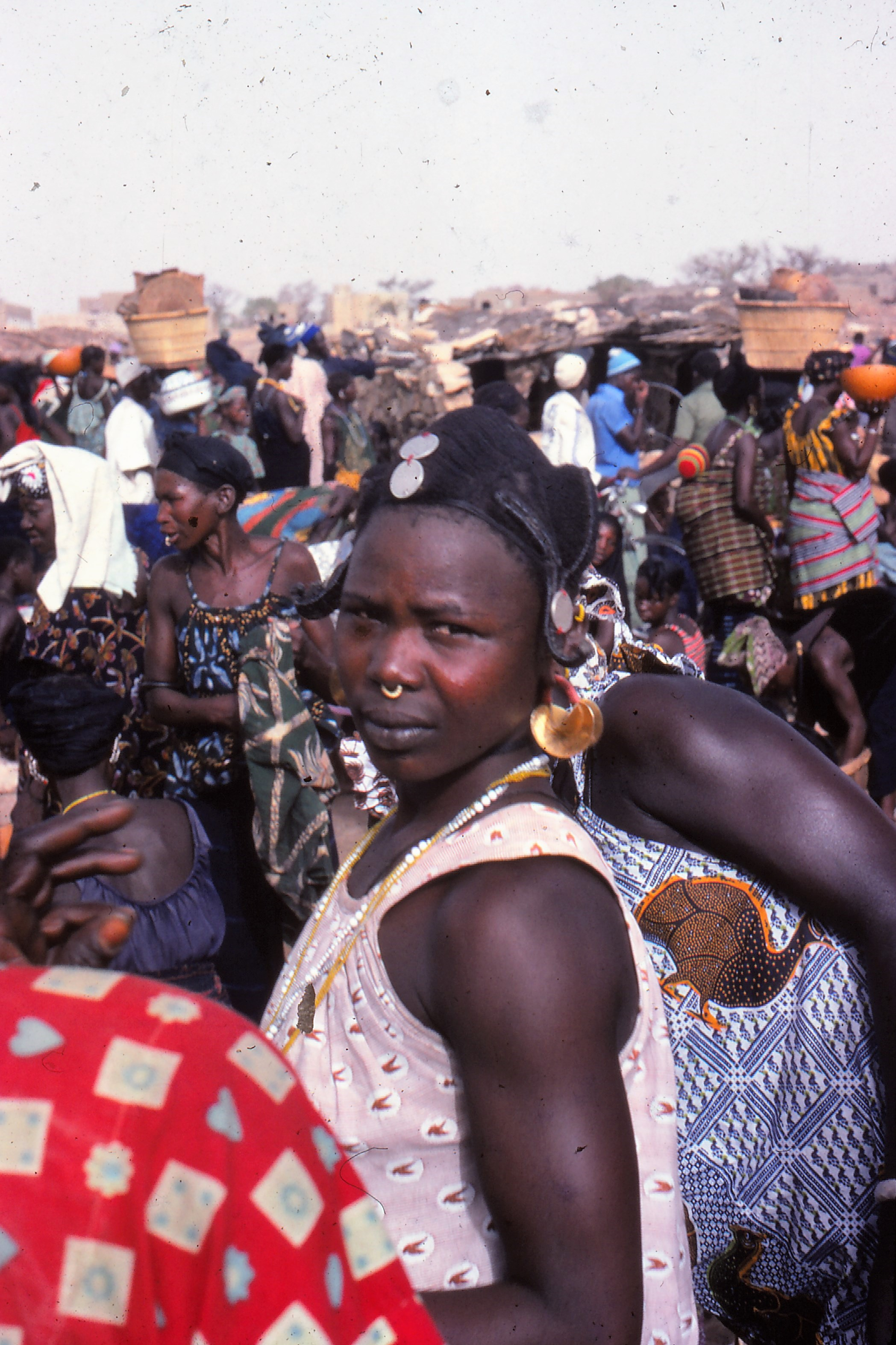
Fulbe woman at the Sangha market, Mali 1992

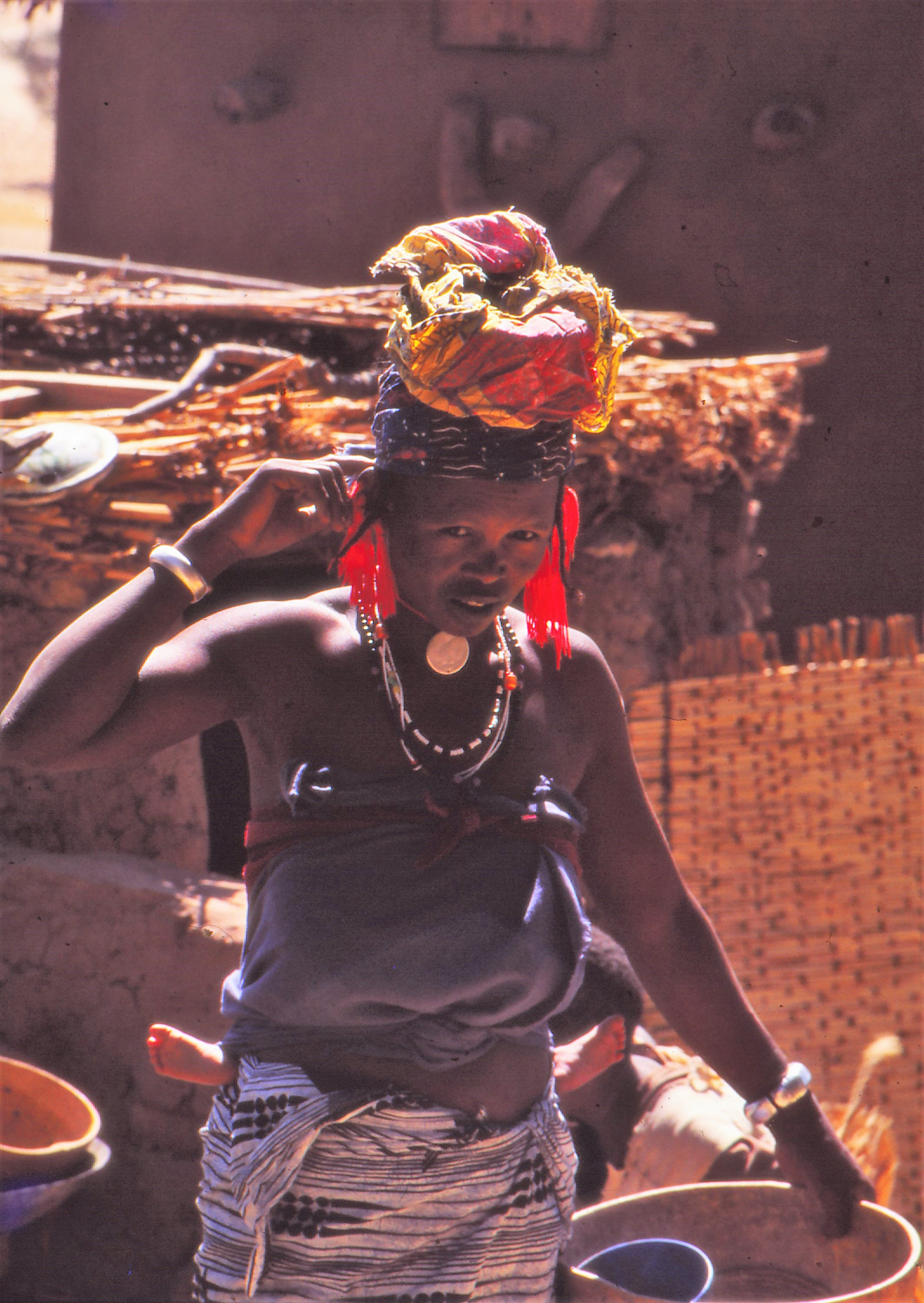
Fulbe woman at the Sangha market, Mali 1992

The Fulani, migrant Arabs and Hausa people have taken some influences from each other's cultures. Upon the success recorded in the 1804 Fulani War of Usman dan Fodio, many formerly nomadic Fulɓe subsequently joined the ruling classes of the many emirates of the Sokoto Caliphate. The Fulɓe of Hausaland dress in the clothing and speak the language of their Hausa neighbours (see Hausa–Fulani). Because the Fulɓe in the emirates outside of Hausaland (such as parts of Kanem-Bornu, Adamawa and Gombe) became the dominant ethnic group in these lands, they still retain much of their Fulani culture, and still speak Fulfulde as their first language. The Fulɓe who did not settle during this period and their descendants, however, still keep an obvious distinct identity from that of the Hausa and other surrounding groups of the region. This Hausa–Fulani interaction is uncommon outside the eastern subregion of West Africa.

In Mali, Burkina Faso and Senegal for instance, those within the Fulɓe cultural sphere, but who are not ethnically Fula, are referred to as yimɓe pulaaku (𞤴𞤭𞤥𞤩𞤫 𞤆𞤵𞤤𞤢𞥄𞤳𞤵, "people of the Fula culture"). As such, Fulani culture includes people who may or may not be ethnic Fulani. Although slavery is now illegal, memories of the past relationship between Fulɓbe and Rimayɓe are still very much alive in both groups. Paul Riesman, an American ethnographer who resided among the Jelgooji Fulɓbe of Burkina Faso in the 1980s, states that the Fulɓe are tall, slim, and light-skinned; they have thin straight noses, and their hair tends to be long and curly. In contrast, the Rimayɓe are stocky, tending towards corpulence, dark-skinned with flat 'squashed' noses, and short kinky hair.

=== Slavery and caste system ===
The first Fulani people who were forcibly expatriated to America during the Atlantic slave trade came from several parts of West and Central Africa. Many Fulani slaves came from places such as Guinea, Senegal, Guinea-Bissau, Sierra Leone, Nigeria and Cameroon. Most of the slaves who came from Senegal belonged to Fula and Mandinga peoples. Some of the most common names found on the Registry of Liberated Africans were Fulani in origin. Many of the captors and perpetrators of raids providing sources for the European slave merchants were also Fulani.

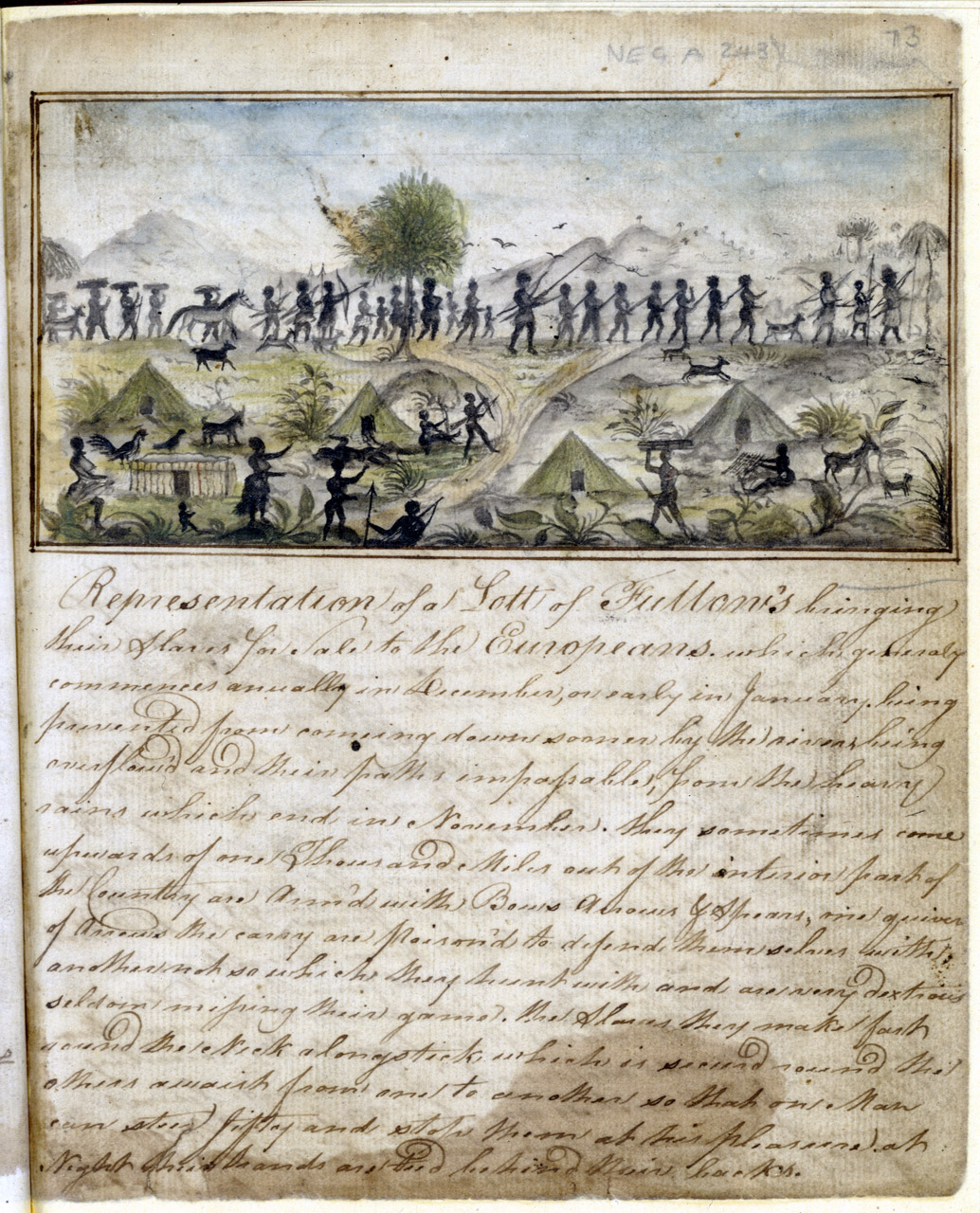
Samuel Gamble, Log of the slaver-ship Sandown: Africans being brought to the coast at Sierra Leone by the Fulani people.

Fula society features the caste divisions typical of the West African region. The fairly rigid caste system of the Fula people has medieval roots, had become well established by the 15th-century, and has survived into modern age. The four major castes, states Martin Kich, in their order of status are "nobility, traders, tradesmen (such as blacksmith) and descendants of slaves". According to the African Commission on Human and Peoples' Rights, the Fulani people have held on to "a strict caste system".

There are the Fulani proper, also referred to as the Fulɓe, including the Pullo (also called the Rimɓe (singular)) and the Dimo, meaning "noble". There is the artisan caste, including blacksmiths, potters, griots, genealogists, woodworkers, and dressmakers. They belong to castes but are considered free people. Then there are those castes of captive, slave or serf ancestry: the Maccuɗo, Rimmayɓe, Dimaajo, and less often Ɓaleeɓe, the Fulani equivalent of the Tuareg Ikelan known as Bouzou (Buzu) or Bella in the Hausa and Songhay languages respectively. The Fulani rulers and merchants were, like many other ruling ethnic groups of Africa, also involved in the trans-Atlantic slave trade, sourcing the enslaved people through raids and from captives they took by waging war. Many Fulani were enslaved and raided by ethnic groups who adhered to traditional African religions.

The Fulani castes are endogamous in nature, meaning individuals marry only within their caste. This caste system, however, wasn't as elaborate in places like northern Nigeria, Eastern Niger or Cameroon. According to some estimates, by the late 19th century, slaves constituted about 50% of the population of the Fulɓe-ruled Adamawa Emirate, where they were referred to as jeyaɓe (singular jeyado). Though very high, these figures are representative of many other emirates of the Sokoto Caliphate, of which Adamawa formed a part. The castes-based social stratification among the Fula people was widespread and seen across the Sahel, such as Burkina Faso, Niger, Senegal, Guinea, Mali, Nigeria, Sudan, and others.

== Culture ==
=== Traditional livelihood ===
The Fulani are traditionally a nomadic, pastoralist trading people. They herd cattle, goats and sheep across the vast dry hinterlands of their domain, keeping somewhat separate from the local agricultural populations. They are the largest nomadic ethnic group in the world and inhabit several territories over an area larger in size than the continental United States. The pastoral lifestyle of the herders' tribe makes it complicated for a non-member to date or marry a Fulani woman.

The Fulani follow a code of behaviour known as pulaaku, which consists of the qualities of patience, self-control, discipline, prudence, modesty, respect for others (including foes), wisdom, forethought, personal responsibility, hospitality, courage, and hard work. Among the nomadic Fulani, women in their spare time make handicrafts including engraved gourds, weavings, knitting, beautifully made covers for calabashes known as mbeedu, and baskets. The Fulani men are less involved in the production of crafts such as pottery, iron-working, and dyeing, unlike males from neighbouring ethnic groups around them.

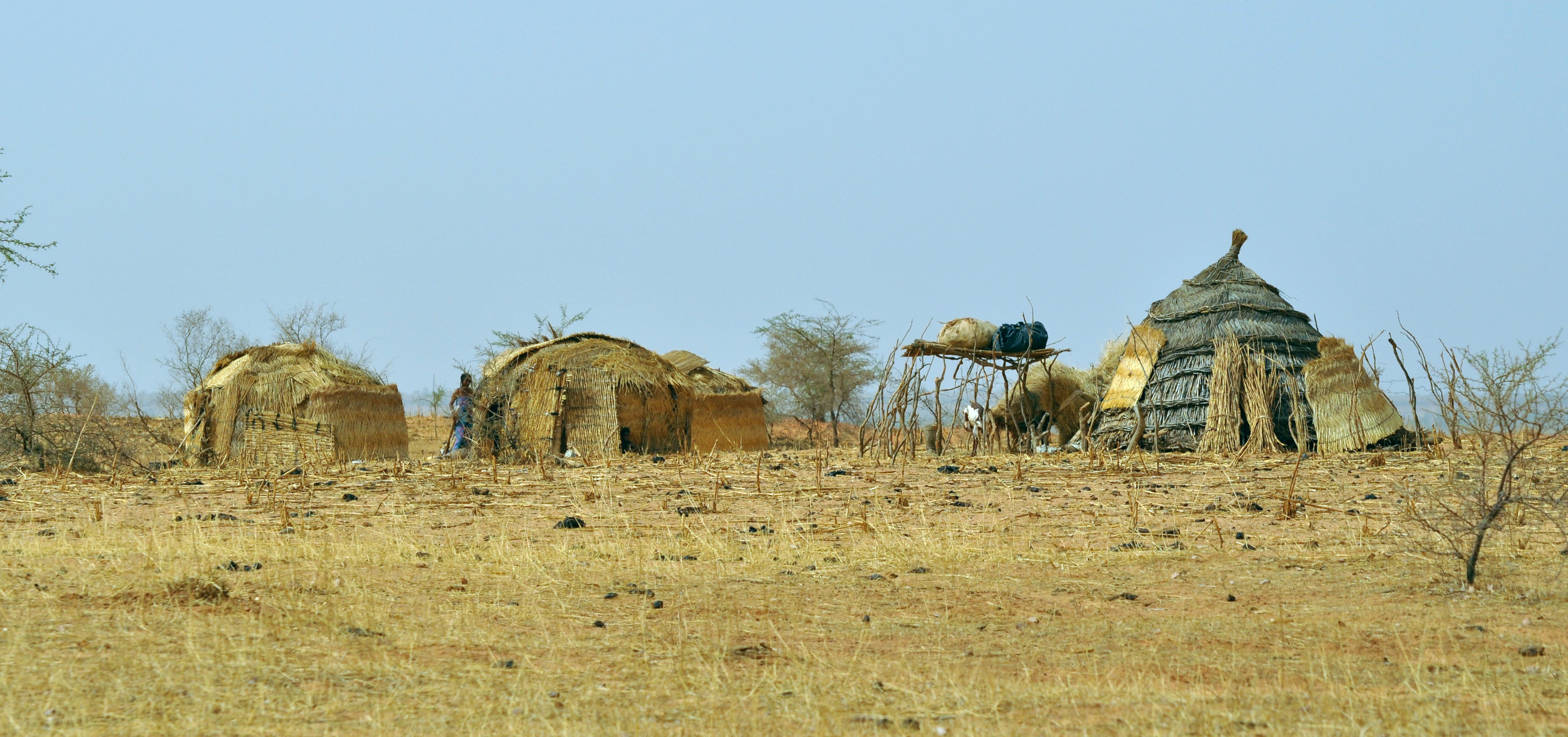
Fulani pastoralists in Niger

In virtually every area of West Africa, where the nomadic Fulɓe reside, there has been an increasing trend of conflicts between farmers (sedentary) and grazier (pastoral nomadic). There have been numerous such cases on the Jos Plateau, the Western High Plateau, the Central/Middle Belt regions of Nigeria, Northern Burkina Faso, and Southern Chad. The rearing of cattle is a principal activity in four of Cameroon's ten administrative regions as well as three other provinces with herding on a lesser scale, throughout the North and Central regions of Nigeria, as well as the entire Sahel and Sudan region.

For decades there have been intermittent skirmishes between the Woɗaaɓe Bororo (graziers) and sedentary farmers such as the Jukun, Tiv, Chamba, Bamileke, Wurkum, Bachama, Jenjo, Mbula, Berom, Mumuye, Kare Kare, and sometimes even the Hausa. Such conflicts usually begin when cattle have strayed into farmlands and destroyed crops. Thousands of Fulani have been forced to migrate from their traditional homelands in the Sahel, to areas further south, because of increasing encroachment of Saharan desertification. Nigeria alone loses 2,168 square kilometres (837 sq mi) of cattle rangeland and cropland every year to desertification, posing serious threats to the livelihoods of about 20 million people.

Recurrent droughts have meant that a lot of traditional herding families have been forced to give up their nomadic way of life, losing a sense of their identity in the process. Increasing urbanization has also meant that a lot of traditional Fulani grazing lands have been taken for developmental purposes, or forcefully converted into farmlands. These actions often result in violent attacks and reprisal counterattacks being exchanged between the Fulani, who feel their way of life and survival are being threatened, and other populations who often feel aggrieved from loss of farm produce even if the lands they farm on were initially barren and uncultivated.

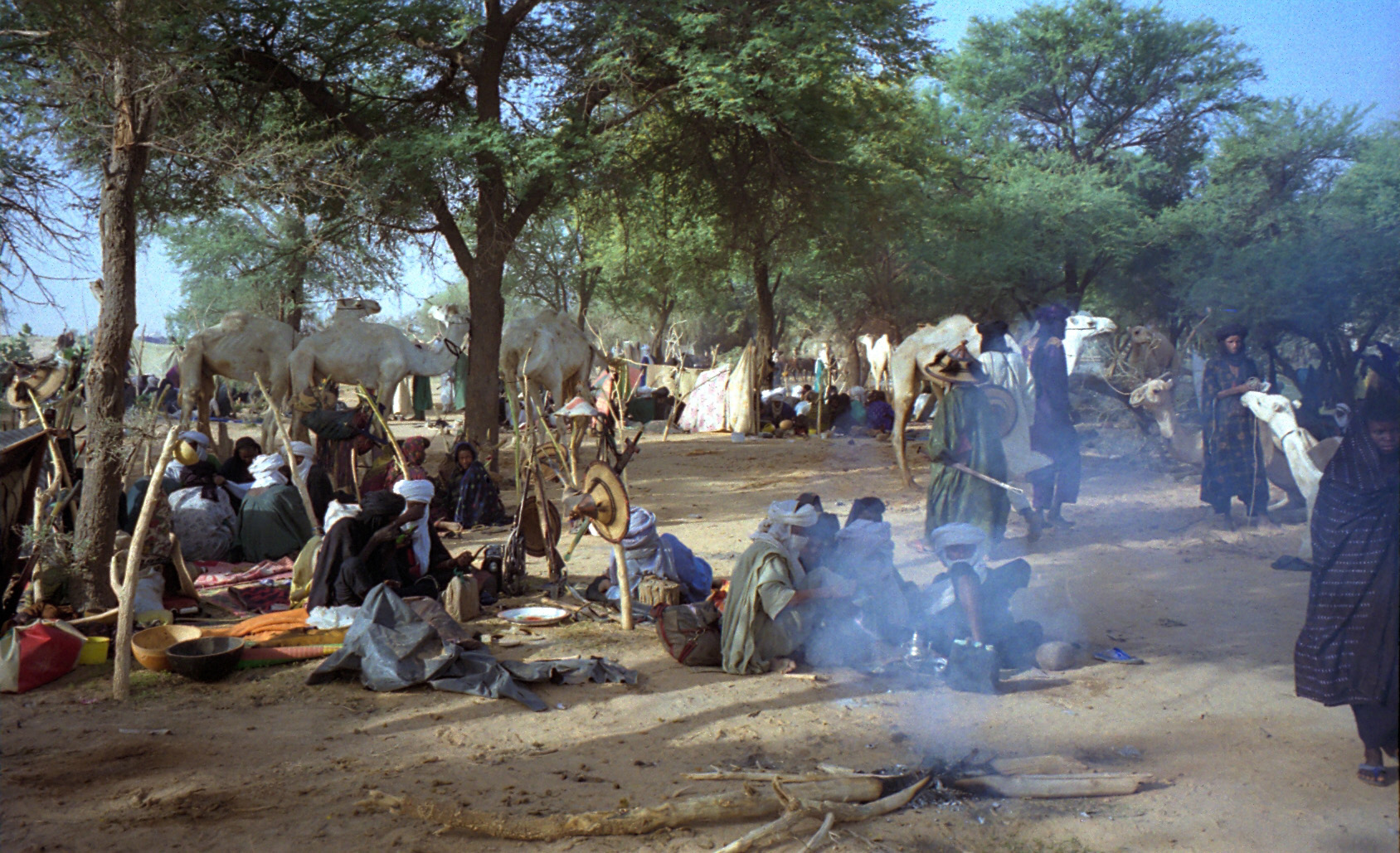
Several Wodaabe clans in Niger have gathered for a Guérewol festival

Fulani in Nigeria have often requested for the development of exclusive grazing reserves, to curb conflicts. All the leading presidential aspirants of previous elections seeking Fulɓe votes have made several of such failed promises in their campaigns. Discussions among government officials, traditional rulers, and Fulani leaders on the welfare of the pastoralists have always centred on requests and pledges for protecting grazing spaces and cattle passages. The growing pressure from Ardo'en (the Fulani community leaders) for the salvation of what is left of the customary grazing land has caused some state governments with large populations of herders (such as Gombe, Bauchi, Adamawa, Taraba, Plateau, and Kaduna) to include in their development plans the reactivation and preservation of grazing reserves. Quick to grasp the desperation of cattle-keepers for land, the administrators have instituted a Grazing Reserve Committee to find a lasting solution to the rapid depletion of grazing land resources in Nigeria.

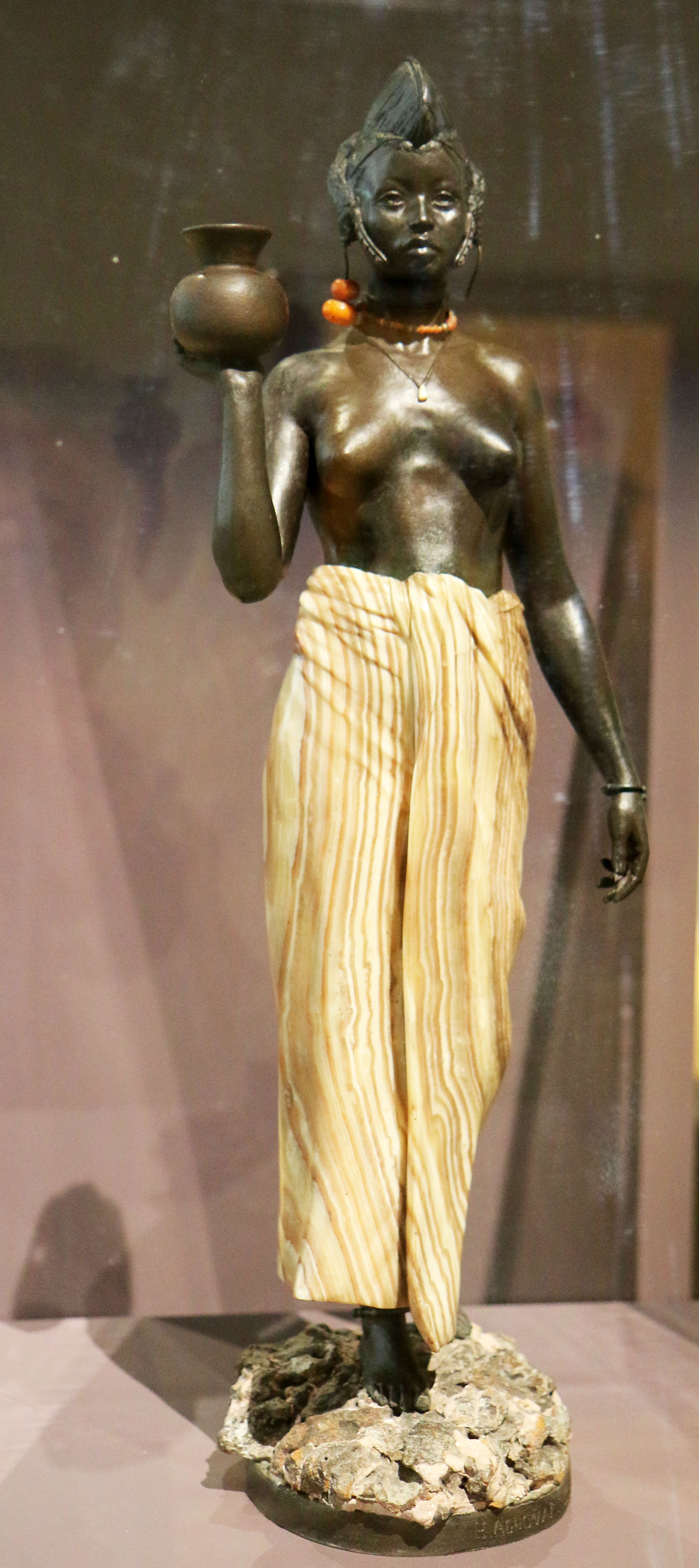
Henri Allouard (1844–1929) – Young Fulani woman

The Fulani believe that the expansion of the grazing reserves will boost livestock population, lessen the difficulty of herding, reduce seasonal migration, and enhance the interaction among farmers, pastoralists, and rural dwellers. Despite these expectations, grazing reserves are not within the reach of about three-quarters of the nomadic Fulani in Nigeria, who number in the millions, and about sixty per cent of migrant pastoralists who use the existing grazing reserves keep to the same reserves every year. The number and the distribution of the grazing reserves in Nigeria range from insufficient to severely insufficient for Fulani livestock. In countries like Nigeria, Cameroon, and Burkina Faso where some cow supplies are dependent on the Fulani, such conflicts lead to hikes in beef prices. In recent times, the Nigerian senate and other lawmakers have been bitterly divided in attempts to pass bills on grazing lands and migration "corridors" for Fulani Herdsmen. This was mainly due to Southern and Central Nigerian lawmakers opposing the proposal, and Northern Lawmakers being in support. Fulani extremists are involved in herder-farmer conflicts in Nigeria. According to the Global Terrorism Index, a continuous sequence of Fulani attacks across West Africa have occurred in Mali, Central African Republic, Democratic Republic of Congo, and Cameroon. The cumulative fatalities in these attacks is in the thousands.

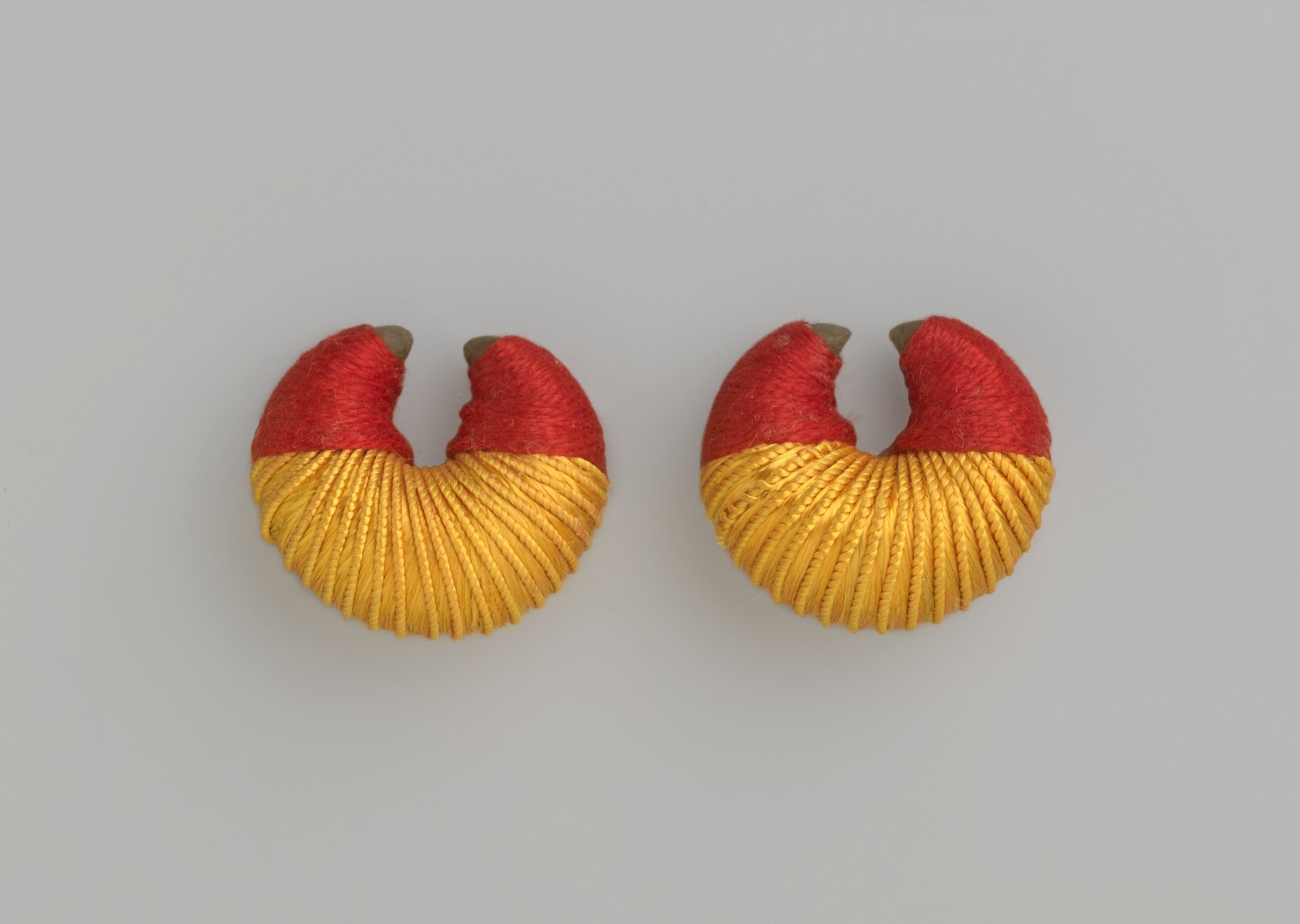
Pair of Earrings; 1981; 3.2 x 3.2 x 1.9 cm (1 1/4 x 1 1/4 x 3/4 in.); Brooklyn Museum (New York City)

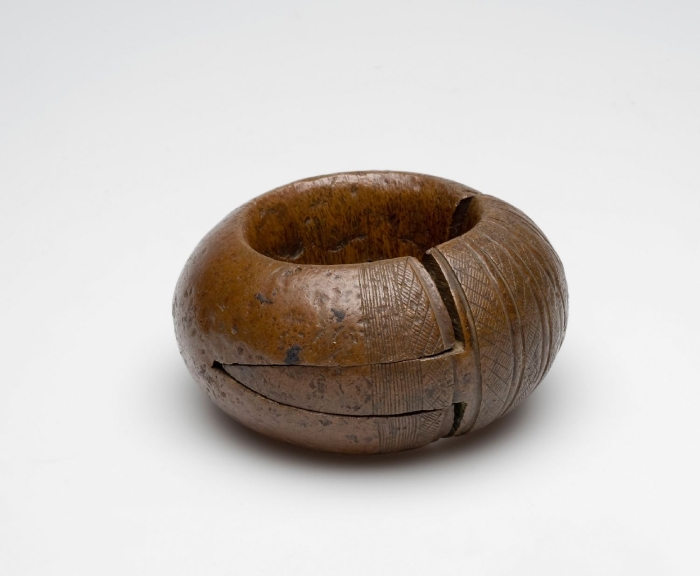
Bracelet; made before 1985; red copper; 5.3 x 10.6 x 10.6 cm (2 1/16 x 4 3/16 x 4 3/16 in.); Nationaal Museum van Wereldculturen (the Netherlands)

=== Language ===
The language of the Fulani is "Pulaar" 𞤆𞤵𞤤𞤢𞥄𞤪, which is also the language of the Toucouleurs. All Senegalese and Mauritanians who speak the language natively are known as the Halpulaar (𞤖𞤢𞤤𞤨𞤵𞤤𞤢𞥄𞤪) or Haalpulaar'en (𞤖𞤢𞥄𞤤𞤵𞤤𞤢𞥄𞤪𞥇𞤫𞤲), which means "speakers of Pulaar" ("hal" is the root of the Pulaar verb haalugol 𞤖𞤢𞥄𞤤𞤵𞤺𞤮𞤤, meaning "to speak"). In some areas, e.g. in northern Cameroon, Fulfulde is a local lingua franca.

There are three writing systems used to write this language: an Arabic derived one called Ajami, a Latin derived system with 6 sets, and a native phonetic-faithful system called Adlam recently invented in 1989; the third one is the most increasingly popular not only learnt by hundreds of thousands of people among the diaspora worldwide but has also apps and computer programs created to assist in the script's adoption.

=== Moral code ===
Central to the Fulani people's lifestyle is a code of behavior known as pulaaku (Fulfulde: 𞤆𞤵𞤤𞤢𞥄𞤳𞤵) or laawol Fulɓe (𞤂𞤢𞥄𞤱𞤮𞤤 𞤆𞤵𞤤𞤩𞤫) literally meaning the "Fulani pathways" which are passed on by each generation as high moral values of the Fulbe, which enable them to maintain their identity across boundaries and changes of lifestyle. Essentially viewed as what makes a person Fulani, or "Fulaniness", pulaaku includes:

- Munyal: Patience, self-control, discipline, prudence
- Gacce / Semteende: Modesty, respect for others (including foes)
- Hakkille: Wisdom, forethought, personal responsibility, hospitality
- Sagata / Tiinaade: Courage, hard work

=== Dress ===
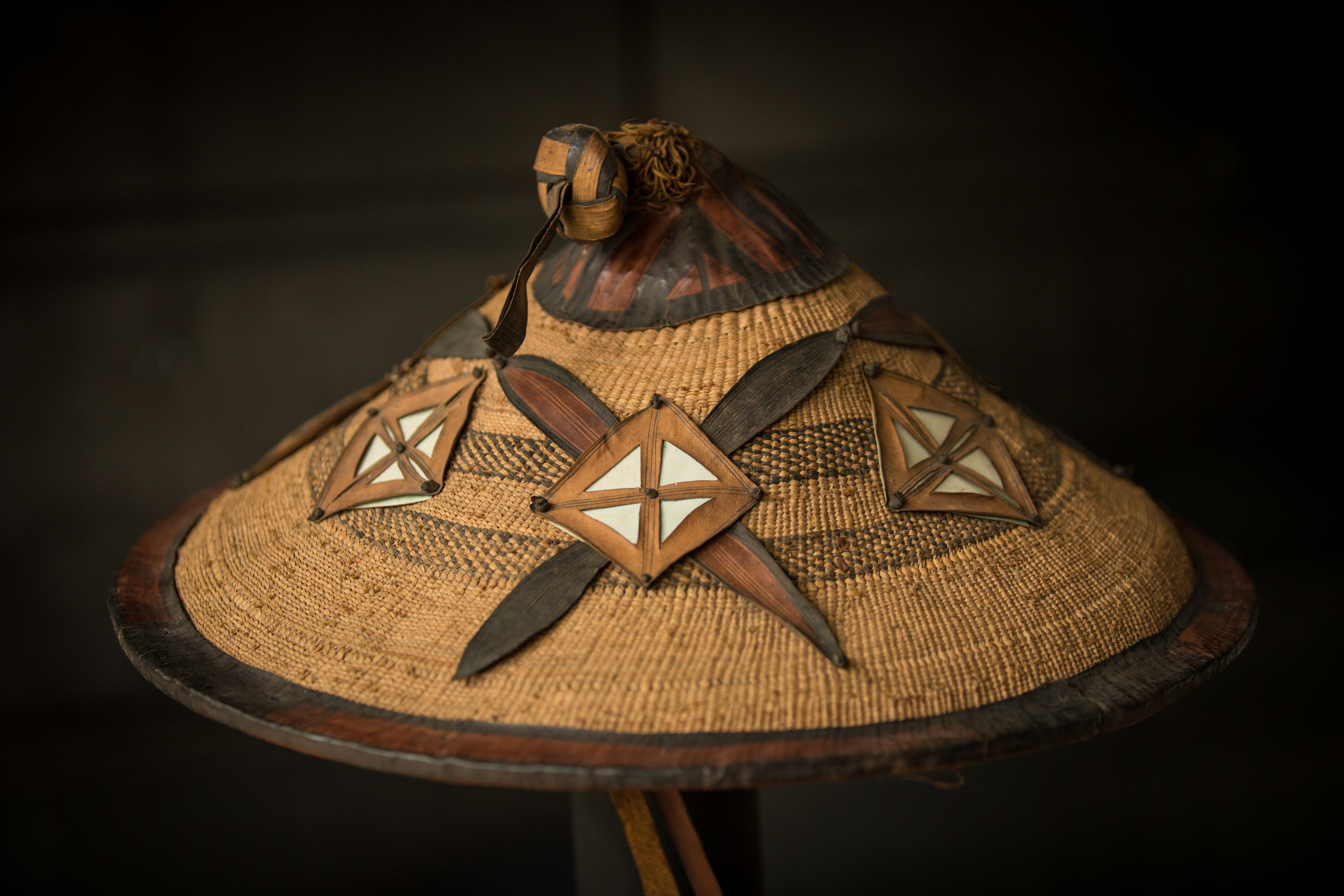
The traditional hat (Tengaade) of the Fulani people worn in diverse slightly different variations among every Fula subgroup

There are no particular outfits for all Fulani sub-groups; dressing and clothing accessories such as ornaments mostly depend on the particular region. The traditional dress of the Fulbe Wodaabe consists of long colourful flowing robes, modestly embroidered or otherwise decorated. In the Futa Jallon highlands of central Guinea, it is common to see men wearing a distinctive hat with colorful embroidery. In Nigeria, Cameroon and Niger, men wear a hat that tapers off at three angular tips, known as a noppiire. Both men and women wear a characteristic white or black cotton fabric gown, adorned with intricate blue, red and green thread embroidery work, with styles differing according to region and sex.

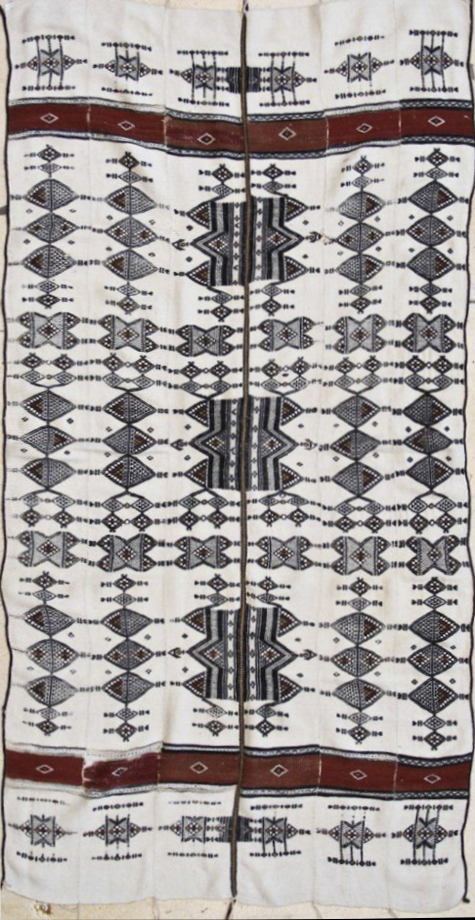
Antique Fulani Blanket, Mali, estimated to be from the 1920s courtesy the WOVENSOULS collection

It is not uncommon to see the women decorate their hair with bead hair accessories as well as cowrie shells. Fula women often use henna for hand, arm and feet decorations. Their long hair is put into five long braids that either hang or are sometimes looped on the sides. It is common for women and girls to have silver coins and amber attached to their braids. Some of these coins are very old and have been passed down in the family. The women often wear many bracelets on their wrists. The women can also be seen wearing a colorful cloth (modjaare) around, the waist, head or over one shoulder.

Like the men, the women have markings on their faces around their eyes and mouths that they were given as children. The Western Fulbe in countries like Mali, Senegal and Mauritania use indigo inks around the mouth, resulting in a blackening around the lips and gums.

Fulani men are often seen wearing solid-colored shirt and pants which go down to their lower calves, made from locally grown cotton, a long cloth wrapped around their faces, and a conical hat made from straw and leather on their turbans, and carrying their walking sticks across their shoulders with their arms resting on top of it. Often the men have markings on either side of their faces and/or on their foreheads. They received these markings as children. Fula ethics are strictly governed by the notion of pulaaku. Women wear long robes with flowery shawls. They decorate themselves with necklaces, earrings, nose rings and anklets.

=== Herding ===
Fula are primarily known to be pastoralists, but are also traders in some areas. Most Fula in the countryside spend long times alone on foot, and can be seen frequently parading with their cattle throughout the west African hinterland, moving their herds in search of water and better pasture. They were, and still are, the only major migratory people group of West Africa, although the Tuareg people, another nomadic tribe of North African origin, live just immediately north of Fula territory, and sometimes live alongside the Fulani in countries such as Mali, Niger and Burkina Faso. The Fulani, as a result of their constant wandering of the past, can be seen in every climatic zone and habitat of West Africa, from the deserts of the north, to the derived savannah and forests of the south.

From the 16th to 20th centuries many Fulani communities settled in the highlands of the Jos Plateau, the Western High Plateau of Bamenda, and Adamawa Plateau of Nigeria and the Cameroons. These are the highest elevated places in West Africa, and their altitude can reach up to 8,700 feet above sea level. The highland plateaus have a more temperate climate conducive for cattle herding activities, which allowed Fulbe populations to settle there in waves of migrations from further west. Though most Fula now live in towns or villages, a large proportion of the population is still either fully nomadic, or semi-nomadic in nature.

Wealth is counted by how large the herd of cattle is. Long ago Fulani tribes and clans used to fight over cattle and grazing rights. Being the most treasured animal that the Fulanis herd, the cows are very special. Many people say that a person cannot speak Fulfulde if he does not own a cow. The Fulani have a tradition of giving a habbanaya – a cow which is loaned to another until she calves. Once the calf is weaned it is retained and the cow is returned to its owner. This habbanaya is a highly prized animal. Upon receipt of this gift, there is a special ceremony in honor of the gift. The recipient buys special treats and invites his neighbors for this event in which the habbanaya is given a name. The habbanaya is never to be struck under any circumstance.

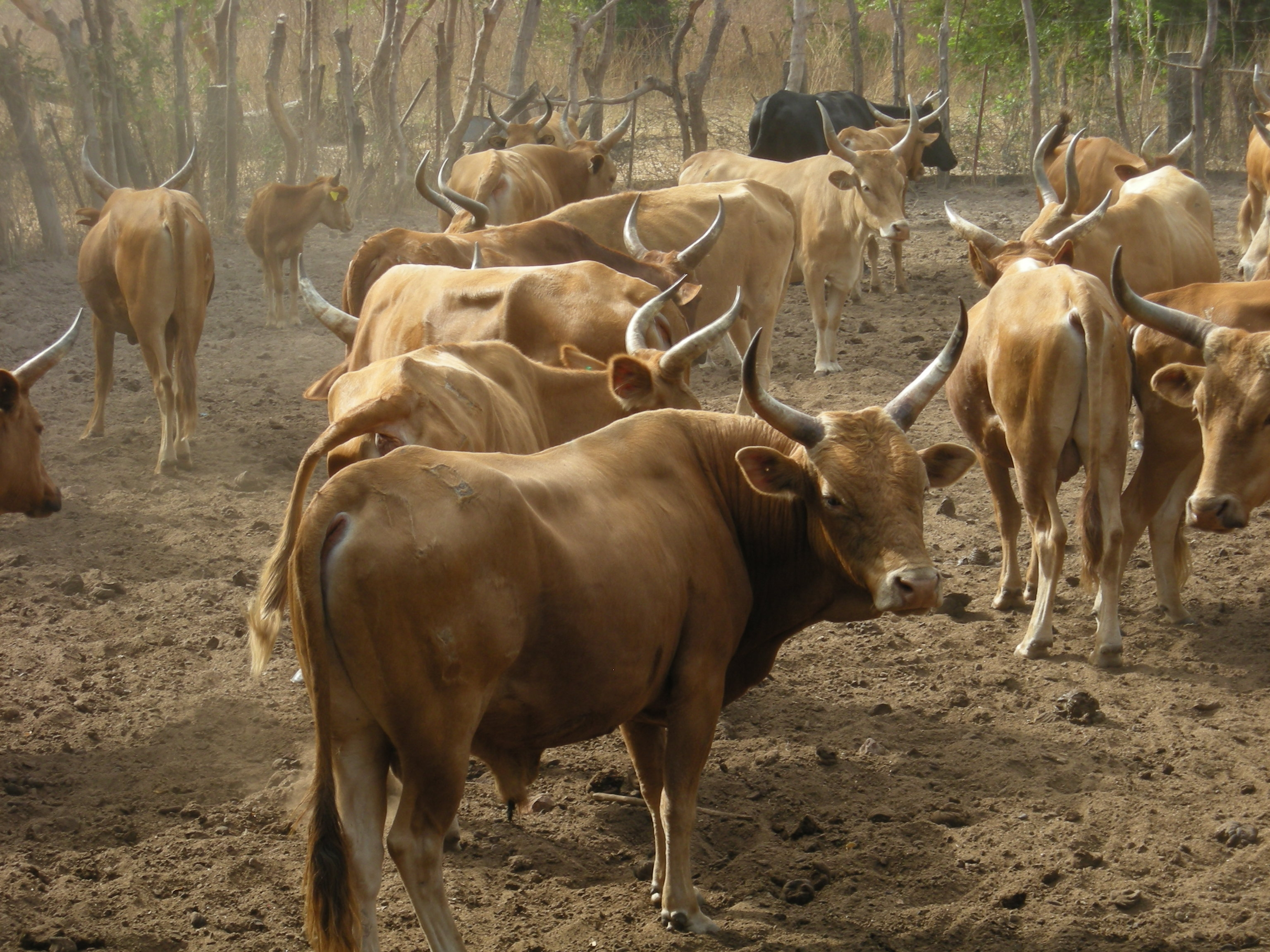
An N'Dama herd in West Africa

Fulani nomads keep various species of cattle, but the zebu is the most common in the West African hinterland, due to its drought resistant traits. In the wetter areas of Fouta Djallon and Casamance, the dwarf N'Dama is more common, as they are highly resistant to trypanosomiasis and other conditions directly associated with high humidity. Subspecies of zebu include the White Fulani cattle, locally known as the Aku, Akuji, Bororoji, White Kano, Yakanaji or Bunaji, which are an important beef breed of cattle found throughout the area owned by both Fulani and Hausa people and beyond in the Sahel zone of Africa.

The Red Fulani cattle, which are called the Jafun French: Djafoun in Nigeria and Cameroon, and Fellata in Chad, as well as other names such as the M'Bororo, Red Bororo, or Bodaadi, another subspecies is the Sokoto Gudali and the Adamawa Gudali or simply Gudali, which means "horned and short legged" in the Hausa language. The widely accepted theory for the origin of present-day zebu cattle in West Africa is that they came from the westward spread of the early zebu populations in East Africa through the Sudan. Other breeds of zebu are found mainly in the drier regions. Their body conformation resembles the zebu cattle of eastern Africa. The zebu did not appear in West Africa until about 1800. The increasing aridity of the climate and the deterioration of the environment in the Sahel appear to have favoured the introduction and spread of the zebu, as they are superior to longhorn and shorthorn cattle in withstanding drought conditions.

The origins and classification of the Fulani remains controversial; one school of thought is of the opinion that the Fulani cattle are truly long-horned zebus that first arrived in Africa from Asia on the east coast; these are believed to have been introduced into West Africa by Arab invaders during the seventh century, roughly about the same time that the short-horned zebus arrived into East Africa. This theory is supported by the appearance of the skull as well as the thoracic hump of the Fulani cattle.

Another school of thought contends that these cattle originated from the Horn of Africa, present-day Ethiopia and Somalia, and that interbreeding between the short-horned zebu (which arrived in the Horn around the first millennium BC) and the ancient Hamitic Longhorn and/or B. taurus brachyceros shorthorn (which had arrived much earlier) occurred in the Horn about 2000–1500 BCE. The subsequent successive introductions of the short-horned zebu are believed to have displaced most sanga cattle into southern Africa.

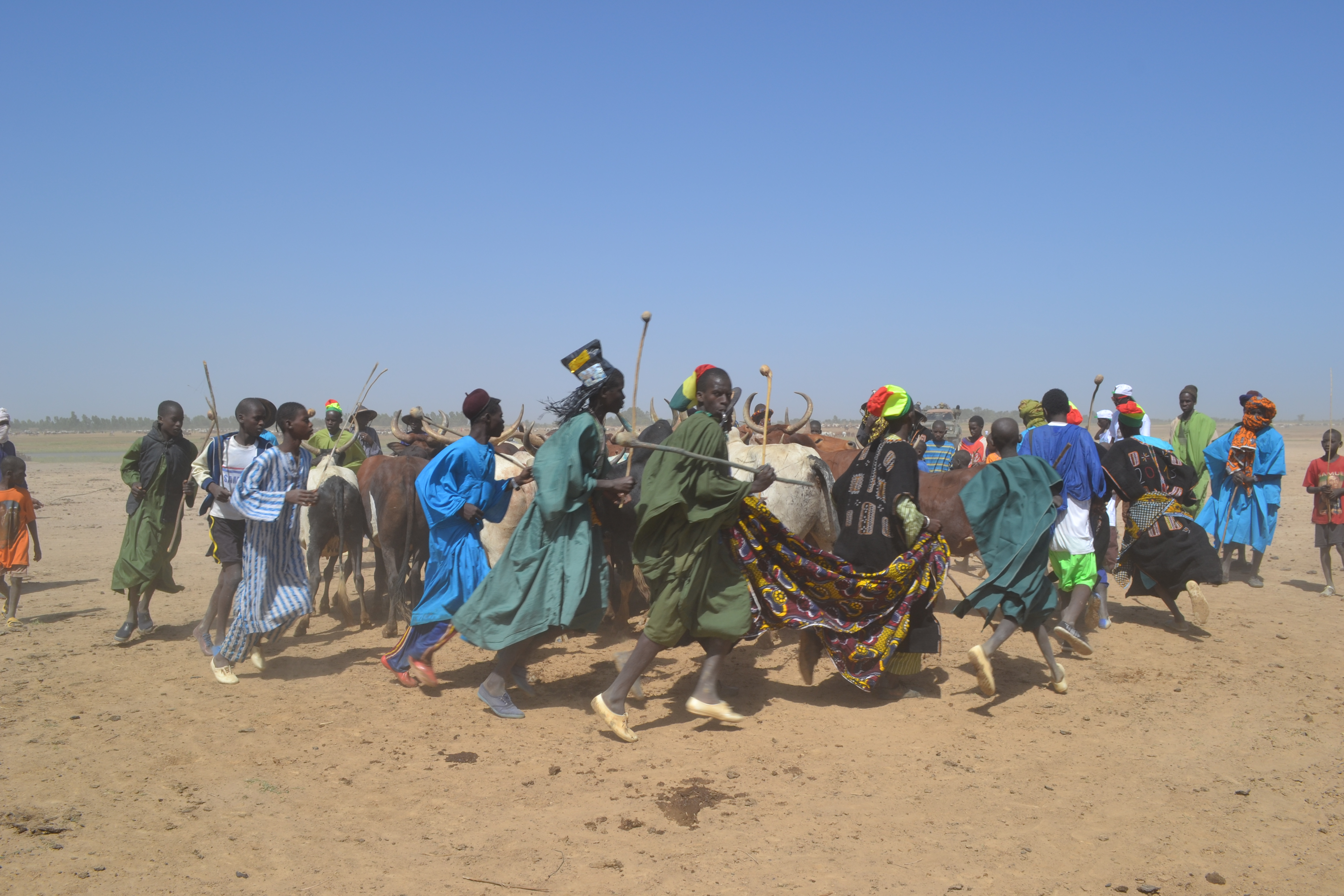
Fulani herders in Mali

During this period of constant movement of people and animals within Africa, some of these sanga cattle probably intermixed with the short-horned, thoracic-humped cattle to produce the thoracic-humped sanga. The latter may have migrated, most probably along with the spread of Islam, westerly to constitute what are today the lyre-horned cattle of West and Central Africa, including the Fulani cattle. Originally the White Fulani were indigenous to north Nigeria, southeast Niger and northeast Cameroon, owned by both Fulani and Hausa people. They then spread to southern Chad and western Sudan.

Every year, in the Malian town of Diafarabé, Fulani men cross the Niger River with their cattle, in an annual cycle of transhumance. This annual festival is known in the local Fulfulde as the Dewgal. Since the founding of the village in 1818, it has always been the most important Fulani festival. It takes place on a Saturday in November or December; the day is carefully chosen based on the state of pastures and the water levels in the river Niger. During the rainy season, the river swells, and the areas around the village are inundated in water, as the level of the river Niger rises, and turns Diafarabe into an island. The cattle are kept on the lush fields up north or south, but when the West African Monsoon subsides and the drier season returns, the water level drops and the cattle can return home again.

The crossing is more than a search for pastures; it is also a competition to show craftsmanship as a herdsmen. The cattle are driven into the river, and each herder, with no help from others, loudly encourages the animals to move forward as he stands or swims between them, holding on to the horns of the bulls. The smaller animals don't have to swim, but are lifted into pirogues. When all the cattle are back, they are judged by a panel, which decides whose animals are the "fattest". That herder is awarded "best caretaker", and he is awarded by the community. The worst caretaker ends up with a shameful "prize" consisting of a single peanut.

Besides being a competition of herding skills, it is also a social event; the herders return after having been away for the most part of the year and they meet their family and friends again. It is a time for celebration. The women decorate their house with woven mats and paint the floor with white and black clay, braid their hair with very intricate patterns, and dress up for their husbands and loved ones. Impressed by the cultural significance attached to the annual event, UNESCO included it on its list of world cultural heritage events.

=== Music ===
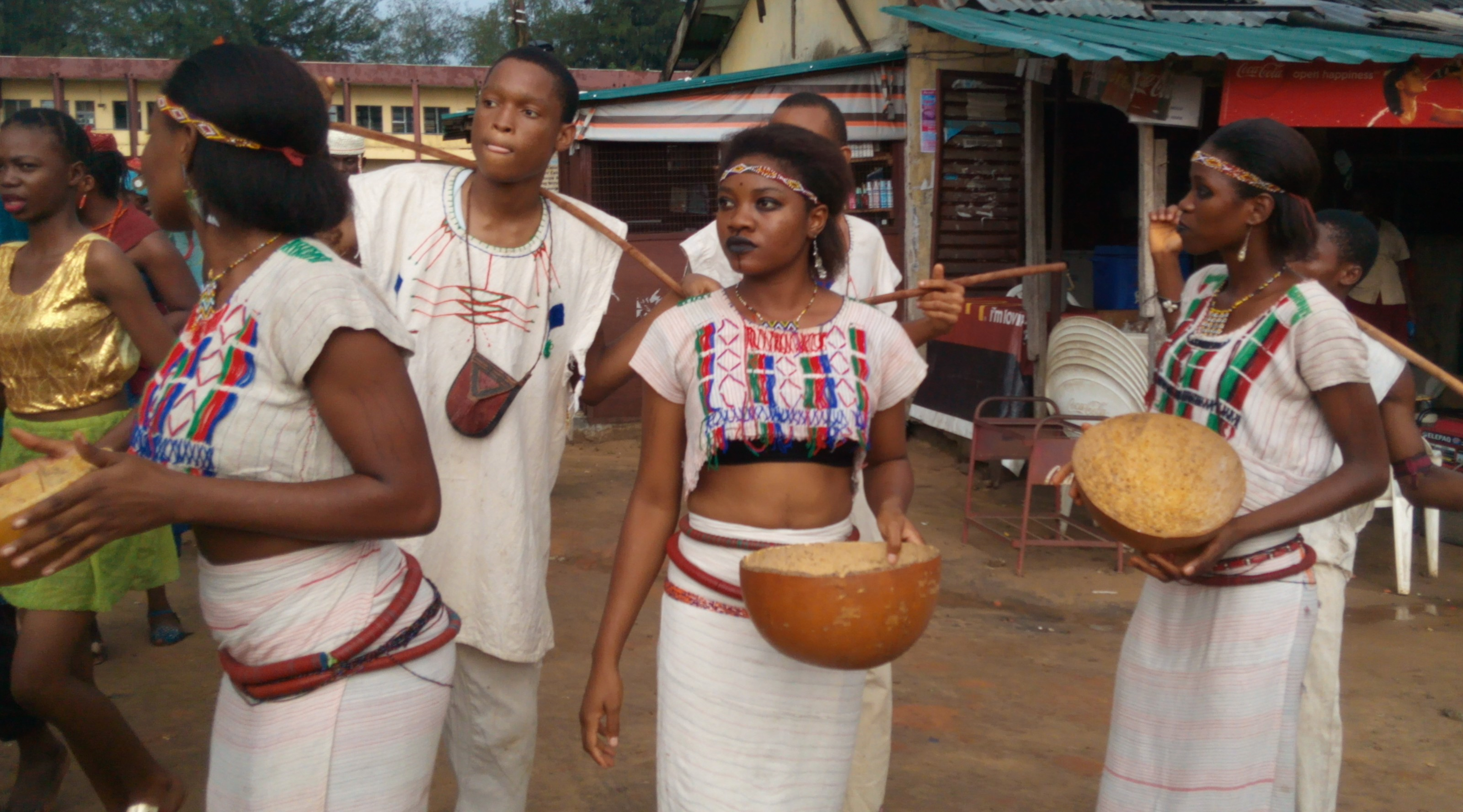
Fulani dancers in their full traditional regalia.

The Fula have a rich musical culture and play a variety of traditional instruments including drums, hoddu (a plucked skin-covered lute similar to a banjo), and riti or riiti (a one-string bowed instrument similar to a violin), in addition to vocal music. The well-known Senegalese Fula musician Baaba Maal sings in Pulaar on his recordings. Zaghareet or ululation is a popular form of vocal music formed by rapidly moving the tongue sideways and making a sharp, high sound.

Fulani music is as varied as its people. The numerous sub-groups all maintain unique repertoires of music and dance. Songs and dances reflect traditional life and are specifically designed for each individual occasion. Music is played at any occasion: when herding cattle, working in the fields, preparing food, or at the temple. Music is extremely important to the village life cycle, with field cultivation, harvest and winnowing of millet performed to the rhythm of the songs and drums.

Fulani herders have a special affinity for the flute and violin nianioru. The young Fulani shepherd like to whistle and sing softly as they wander the silent savannah with cattle and goats. The truly Fulani instruments are the one-string viola of the Fulani (nianioru), the flute, the two to five string lute hoddu or molo, and the buuba and bawdi set of drums. But they are also influenced by the other instruments of the region such as the beautiful West African harp, the kora, and the balafon. Entertainment is the role of certain casts. The performance of music is the realm of specialized casts. The Griots or Awlube recite the history of the people, places and events of the community.

=== Food ===
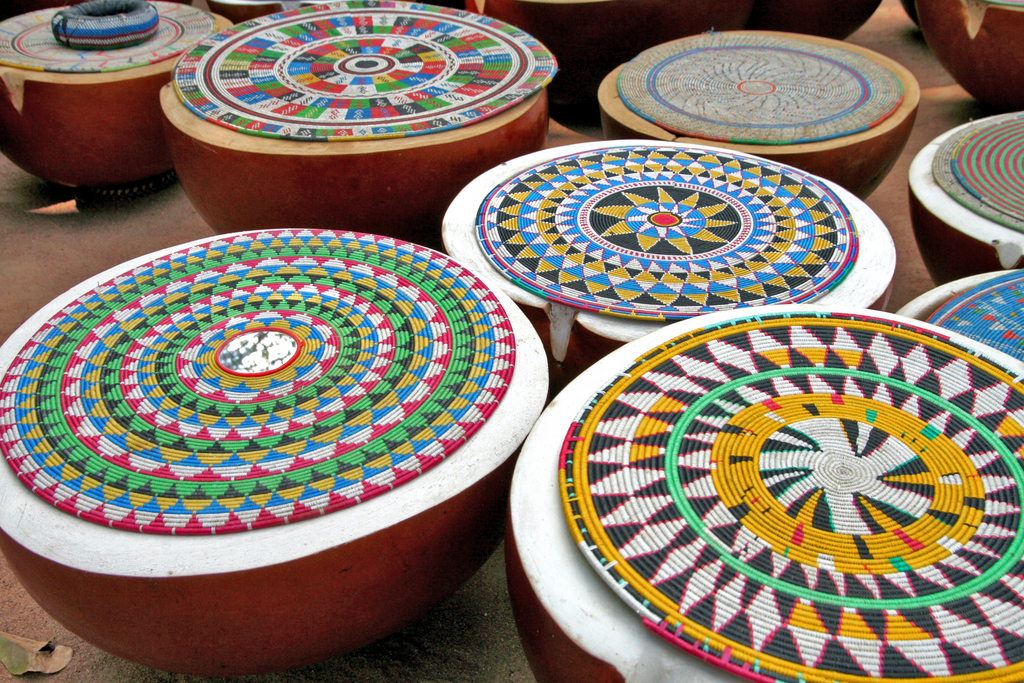
Fulani calabashes used for butter and milk storage and as containers for hawking

Kossam can be the general term for both fresh milk miraɗam and yoghurt known as pendidan in Fulfulde. It is central to Fulbe identity and revered as a drink or in one of its various processed forms, such as yoghurt and cheese. Kettugol and lébol are derived from milk fat, are used in light cooking and hair weaving. It is common to see Fulani women hawking milk products in characteristic beautifully decorated calabashes balanced on their heads. Other meals include a heavy porridge (nyiiri) made of flour from such grains as millet, sorghum, or corn which is eaten in combination with soup (takai, haako) made from tomatoes, onions, spices, peppers, and other vegetables. Also, in addition to rice, which is a staple crop for the Fulani people, their main vegetables and staples are yams, corn, beans, and red pepper. The Fulani people eat cassava roots and fruits like plantains as well.

Another popular meal eaten by almost all Fulani communities is made from fermenting milk into yoghurt and eaten with corn couscous known as latchiiri or dakkere, either in the same bowl or separately, also a fluid or porridge called gāri made of flour cereals such as millet, sorghum or corn and milk. The Wodaabe traditionally eat millet, milk and meat as staples. Millet is eaten in the morning, noon and night as a grease with a sauce or stew which usually contains tomatoes, peppers, bone, meat, onion, and other vegetables. On special occasions they eat meat such as goat or beef. A thick beverage similar to the Tuareg eghajira is made by pounding goat cheese, milk, dates and millet.

=== Ceramics ===
The Fulani people are not as engaged in artistic endeavors like ceramics and pottery as other nearby cultures because they feel that these pursuits "violate their code of conduct and bring shame upon them". That being said, the Fulani women do produce handicrafts including knitting, weaving, and basketry. Seldom do Fulani men work in crafts.

=== Houses ===
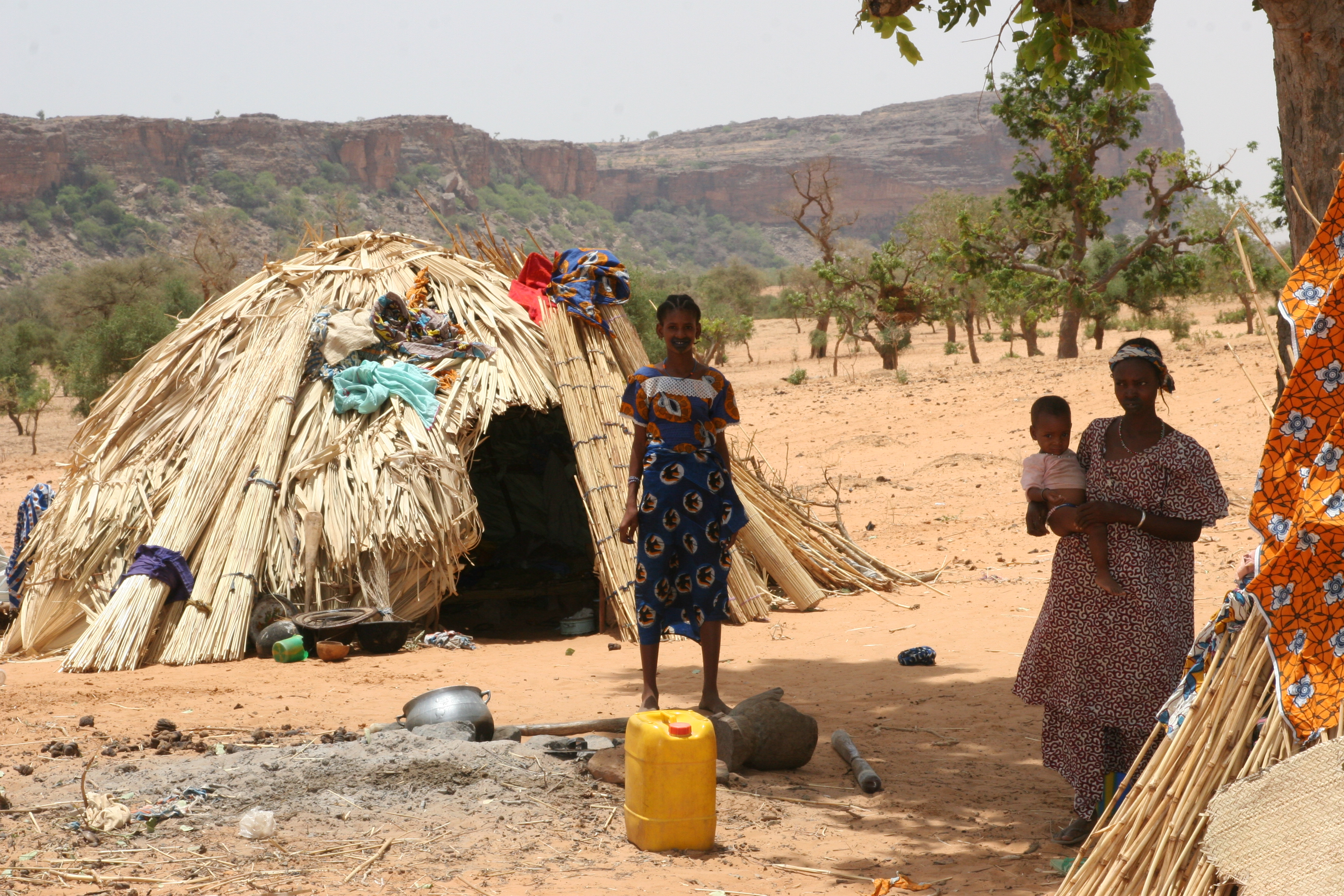
Fulani "grass house" in Mali

Traditionally, nomadic Fula live in domed houses known as a Bukkaru or suudu hudo, literally "grass house". During the dry season, the characteristically hemisphere-shaped domed houses are supported by compact millet stalk pillars, and by reed mats held together and tied against wood poles, in the wet or rainy season. These mobile houses are very easy to set up, and dismantle, as typical of houses from nomadic societies. When it is time to move, the houses are easily disassembled and loaded onto donkeys, horses or camels for transport. With recent trends however, many Fula now live in mud or concrete block houses.

Once they are set up, the room is divided into a sleeping compartment, and another compartment where calabashes and guards of all sizes are intricately arranged in a stack according to their sizes and functions. Spoons made from gourds are hung from the rooftop, with others meant for grain storage.

=== Religion ===
The Fula were one of the first ethnic groups in Sub-Saharan Africa to convert to Islam, maintaining it as an intrinsic part of their cultural identity, although in some cases elements of traditional African faiths are mixed in a predominantly Muslim religious syncretism. The vast majority of Fula people are Muslims, with some religious minorities — largely Fula Christians, a small minority group (1–2%) present in parts of northern Nigeria. Nearly all Fula Christians are recent converts from Islam, or descendants of recent converts. The group faces severe persecution from both Fulani Muslims due to their faith and other Nigerian Christians due to their ethnicity.

== Rites of passage ==
=== Marriage ===
In the Fulani society, marriage is considered endogamy rather than exogamy. Marriage is permitted amongst people of the same lineage. Marriage is generally between cross-cousins and parallel cousins. Even before their birth, the children were betrothed. The caste system and political stratification have a role in their conventional marriage. Marriage exists to maintain wealth and the royal dynasty. They practice early marriage, which is typically arranged by relatives. The men marry in their twenties, while the women marry in their teens. A man is permitted to marry more than one woman so long as he can meet his wives' requirements equally.

The traditional Fulani marriage system consists of three phases: the Kabbal, Koowgal, and Sharo stages.

In the Sharo stage of the marriage process, the man is publicly flogged by other men to assess his strength, discipline, and bravery. If the prospective groom cries, the bride's family may reject him and view him as a coward. Not every ethnic group adheres to this tradition. The groom's people support him during the painful flogging process.

== Genetics ==
The Fulani people are genetically an admixture of West and East African ancestries, specifically Niger-Congo and Nilo-Saharan components, but also display varying degrees of West Eurasian admixture through contact with groups from North Africa. The Fulani are the most wide-spread pastoralist group in the Sahel/Savannah belt.

=== Paternal lineages (Y-DNA) ===
The paternal lineages of the Fula/Fulɓe/Fulani tend to vary depending on geographic location. According to a study by Cruciani et al. (2002), around 90% of Fulani individuals from Burkina Faso carried haplotype 24, which corresponds with the E-M2 (E1b1a) that is common in West Africa. The remainder belonged to haplotype 42/haplogroup E-M132. Both of these clades are today most frequent among Niger–Congo-speaking populations, particularly those inhabiting Senegal. Similarly, 53% of the Fulani in northern Cameroon bore haplogroup E-M132, with the rest mainly carrying other African clades (12% haplogroup A and 6% haplogroup E1b1a). A significant minority carried the West Eurasian haplogroups T (18%) and R1 (12%), making up together around ~30% of the total haplogroup variation. Mulcare et al. (2004) observed a similar frequency of haplogroup R1 subclades in their Fulani samples from Cameroon (18%).

A study by Hassan et al. (2008) on a Fulani subgroup in Sudan observed a significantly higher occurrence of the West-Eurasian haplogroup R1 (53.8%). The remainder belonged to E-M215 subclades, including 34.62% E-M78 and 27.2% E-V22. Bučková et al. (2013) analyzed various Fulani subgroups, and observed R1b among the Fulani Zinder grouping with a frequency of ~31%. This was in sharp contrast to most of the other Fulani pastoralist groups elsewhere, including those from Burkina Faso, Cameroon, Mali and Chad, which instead had nearly exclusive West African paternal haplogroups.

=== Maternal lineages (mtDNA) ===
mtDNA Haplogroups of Fula Groups
Population	African Sub-Saharan mtDNA	Eurasian mtDNA (%)
Fulani Abalak (Niger)	70%	30%
Fulani Ader (Niger)	80%	20%
Fulani Balatungur (Niger)	91%	9%
Fulani Banfora (Burkina Faso)	76%	24%
Fulani Bongor (Chad)	90%	10%
Fulani Diffa (Niger)	90%	10%
Fulani Diafarabe (Mali)	74%	26%
Fulani Fouta Djallon (Guinea)	83%	17%
Fulani Ferlo (Senegal)	98%	2%
Fulani Linia (Chad)	90%	10%
Fulani Tcheboua (Cameroon)	86%	14%
Fulani Tindangou (Burkina Faso)	80%	20%
Fulani Zinder (Niger)	90%	10%
Fulani Ziniare (Burkina Faso)	90%	10%

A study of four Fulani nomad populations (n = 186) in three Sahelian countries (Chad, Cameroon, and Burkina Faso), found that the only group of nomadic Fulani that manifests some similarities with geographically related agricultural populations (from Guinea-Bissau and Nigeria) comes from Tcheboua in northern Cameroon.

=== Autosomal DNA (overall) ===
According to Tishkoff et al. (2009), the Fulani's genomic ancestry clusters near that of Chadic and Central Sudanic speaking populations, with genetic affinities observed to the Hausa people. Based on this, the researchers suggest that the Fulani may have adopted a Niger-Congo language at some point in their history, while intermarrying with local populations. Additionally, moderate levels of West Eurasian admixture was also observed among the Fulani samples, which the authors propose may have been introduced via the Iberian Peninsula and Northern Africa. Dobon et al. (2015), found that the Sudanese Fulani have largely ancestry from Niger-Kordofanian and Nilo-Saharan (Sudanic) speaking groups, with lower amounts of West-Eurasian ancestry.

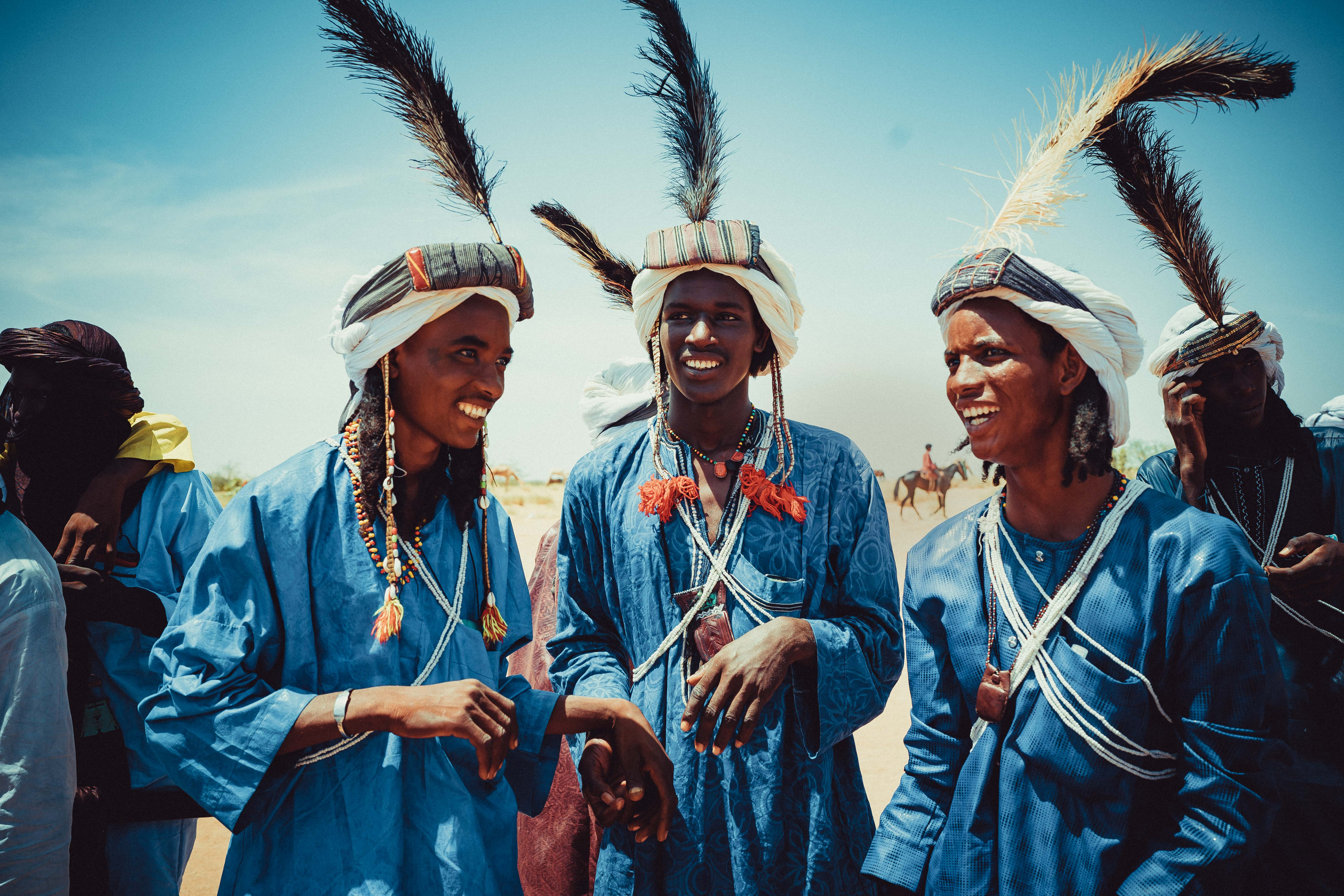
Young Fulani men at the Cure Salee festival, Niger.

Triska, Petr et al. (2015) showed that there is extensive admixture across the Sahel Belt, with the Fula carrying West African and East African components, as well as a Mozabite/North African component. These results support the hypothesis of a North African origin and a Western to Central Africa past migration for Fulani.

A full genome analysis was conducted by Vicente et al. in 2019, analyzing several different Fulani subgroups from various geographic regions. They found that the Fulani people are characterized by the admixture of local West African and East African components, but also display West-Eurasian admixture, mediated through historical North African groups. The West-Eurasian ancestry among Fulani was estimated to a mean average of 21,4% among the 53 samples from Ziniaré in Burkina Faso.

According to the authors, there were two admixture events, the first being about 2,000 years ago, with the second being more recent at around 300 years ago. This Eurasian ancestry was observed in the ancestry components of Mozabite people. They found that: "Our findings suggest that Eurasian admixture and the European LP allele was introduced into the Fulani through contact with a North African population/s. We furthermore confirm the link between the lactose digestion phenotype in the Fulani to the MCM6/LCT locus by reporting the first GWAS of the lactase persistence trait. e observed a T-13910 allele frequency of 48.0%, while the genome-wide European admixture fraction in the Fulani is 21.4% at K = 3. The notable European admixture fraction in the Fulani coupled with the high frequencies of the LP T-13910 allele suggests the possibility of adaptive gene flow into the Fulani gene pool". Another study in 2020 by Priehodová et al., suggest an older date for the introduction of one variant of the LP allele in the Sahel, about ~8.5 ka.

A study in 2019 by Fan et al., found that the Fulani sampled from Cameroon, clustered with Afro-Asiatic speakers from East Africa in the phylogenetic analysis, which the authors said indicates a potential shift in language to Niger-Congo. The analysis on autosomal markers found traces of West Eurasian-related ancestry in this population, which suggests a North African or East African origin (as North and East Africans also have such ancestry likely related to expansions of farmers and herders from the Near East) and is consistent with the presence at moderate frequency of the −13,910T variant associated with lactose tolerance in European populations.

In 2020, a study inferred that the Fulani of western Cameroon have 48% Mende-related, 23% East African-related, and 29% non-African-related ancestry.

In 2023, whole genomes of Fulani individuals from various Sahelian samples were analyzed, and the researches said the non-Sub-Saharan genetic ancestry within the Fulani cannot be solely explained by recent admixture events. Fulani may be descendants of Saharan cattle herders during the last Green Sahara, who had some genomic similarities to Late Neolithic Moroccans based on ancient samples.

Another 2023 study inferred that "The Fulani derived 50% of their ancestry from a population related to the Amhara and 50% from a population related to the Tikari (consistent with TreeMix results with 3 migration events)."

== See also ==
- Dogon people
- Jobawa
- Sullubawa
- Toucouleur people or Torodbe
