= Fulani Bukka =

Fulani temporary tent

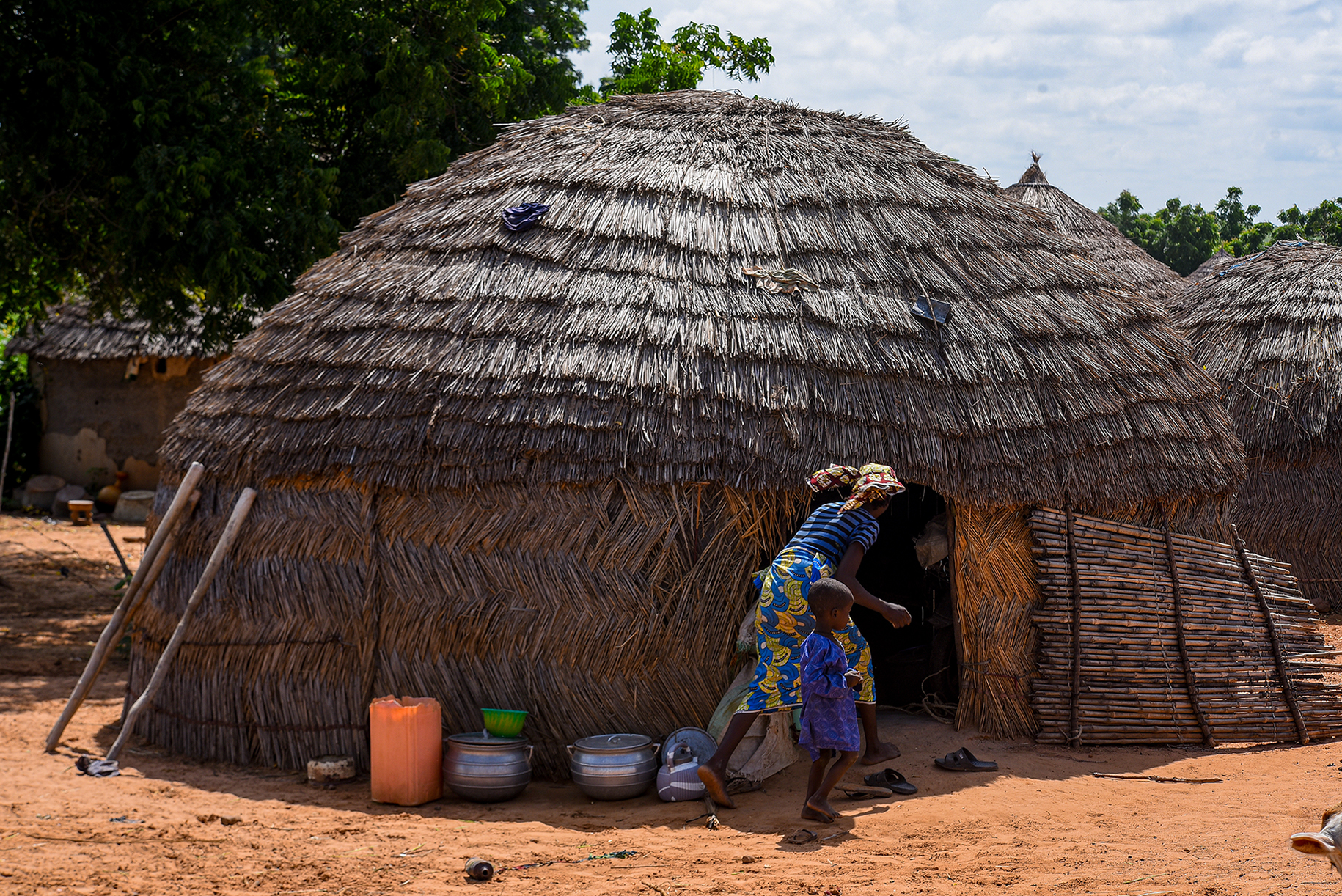
Fulani hut

Bukkaru is a transient tent frequently used by the Fulani people or Pula. It offers a unique decorative and is mostly constructed by the women within the Fulani families. The Bukka provides portable shelter and housing for the semi-nomadic Fulani, who move their herds of cattle across the savannas and grasslands of the region.
