= List of settlements in Senegal =

This is a list of notable cities, towns, and villages in Senegal organized alphabetically and by region:

== Cities ==
See List of cities in Senegal.

== Towns and villages ==
Place Name	Region	Department
Abéné	Ziguinchor Region	
Adéane	Ziguinchor Region	
Adiana	Ziguinchor Region	
Affiniam	Ziguinchor Region	Bignona Department
Agnack Grand	Ziguinchor Region	Ziguinchor Department
Agnack Petit	Ziguinchor Region	Ziguinchor Department
Agnam Civol	Matam Region	
Agnam-Goly	Matam Region	
Agnam Lidoubé	Matam Region	
Agnam Thiodaye	Matam Region	
Aïnoumal	Kaolack Region	
Ali Gane	Kaolack Region	
Aly Oury	Matam Region	
Bacioucoto-Conboly	Ziguinchor Region	Bignona Department
Badème	Ziguinchor Region	Ziguinchor Department
Bagaya	Ziguinchor Region	Bignona Department
Baghagha	Ziguinchor Region	Ziguinchor Department
Baghagha	Ziguinchor Region	Bignona Department
Baïla	Ziguinchor Region	Bignona Department
Bakel	Tambacounda Region	
Bala	Tambacounda Region	
Balankine Nord	Zinguinchor Region	Bignona Department
Balankine Sud	Ziguinchor Region	Bignona Department
Bambey	Diourbel Region	
Bandafassi	Tambacounda Region	
Bargny	Thiès Region	
Dagana	Saint-Louis Region	
Dahra	Louga Region	
Diabougou	Thiès Region	
Dindefelo	Kédougou Region	
Djilas	Fatick Region	
Dodji	Louga Region	
Gama	Kaolack Region	
Gossas	Fatick Region	
Goudomp	Sédhiou Region	
Guédiawaye	Dakar Region	
Guéoul	Louga Region	
Joal-Fadiouth	Thiès Region	
Kahone	Kaolack Region	
Kanel	Matam Region	
Keur Simbara	Thiès Region	
Khombole	Thiès Region	
Kidira	Tambacounda Region	
Koki	Louga Region	
Linguère	Louga Region	
Lol Lol Peul	Louga Region	
Loul Sessène	Fatick Region	
Lydiane	Kaolack Region	
Malicounda Bambara	Thiès Region	
Mbam	Fatick Region	
Mbaké	Diourbel Region	
Mboro	Thiès Region	
Meckhe	Thiès Region	
Merinaghen	Saint-Louis Region	
Mpal	Saint-Louis Region	
Ndiass	Thiès Region	
Ndiayene Bagana	Kaolack Region	
Ndioum	Saint-Louis Region	
Ngaparou	Thiès Region	
Ngazobil	Thiès Region	
Nguékhokh	Thiès Region	
Nguerigne Bambara	Thiès Region	
Ogo	Diourbel Region	
Ogo	Louga Region	
Ouro Sogui	Matam Region	
Palmarin	Fatick Region	
Paoskoto	Kaolack Region	
Pikine	Dakar Region	
Podor	Saint-Louis Region	
Richard Toll	Saint-Louis Region	
Sébikhotane	Dakar Region	
Ségou	Kédougou Region	
Sioure	Saint-Louis Region	
Sokone	Fatick Region	
Tattaguine	Fatick Region	
Thiadiaye	Thiès Region	
Thiaroye	Dakar Region	
Vélingara	Kolda Region	
Yaboyabo	Thiès Region	
