= List of cities in Senegal =

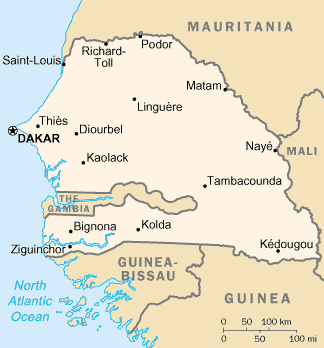
Map of Senegal

This is a list of cities in Senegal organised by population. It includes all cities with an estimated population of over 10,000 people.

== Cities ==
Cities in Senegal
| Rank | City | Population | | | Region |
| Rank | City | 1988 Census | 2002 Census | 2005 estimate | Region |
|---|---|---|---|---|---|
| 1 | Dakar | 1,375,070 | 1,983,093 | 1,998,635 | Dakar |
| 2 | Touba | 123,751 | 419,300 | 428,059 | Diourbel |
| 3 | Thiès | 175,465 | 237,849 | 240,152 | Thiès |
| 4 | Rufisque | 142,340 | 179,797 | 187,203 | Dakar |
| 5 | Kaolack | 150,961 | 172,305 | 173,782 | Kaolack |
| 6 | M'Bour | 76,751 | 153,503 | 170,699 | Thiès |
| 7 | Ziguinchor | 124,283 | 153,269 | 162,436 | Ziguinchor |
| 8 | Saint-Louis | 113,917 | 154,555 | 130,750 | Saint-Louis |
| 9 | Diourbel | 76,548 | 95,984 | 93,767 | Diourbel |
| 10 | Louga | 52,057 | 73,662 | 77,784 | Louga |
| 11 | Tambacounda | 41,885 | 67,543 | 75,245 | Tambacounda |
| 12 | Richard Toll | 29,611 | 42,621 | 60,531 | Saint-Louis |
| 13 | Kolda | 34,337 | 53,921 | 58,362 | Kolda |
| 14 | Mbacké | 38,847 | 51,124 | 56,823 | Diourbel |
| 15 | Tivaouane | 27,117 | 38,213 | 39,026 | Thiès |
| 16 | Joal-Fadiouth | 19,003 | 32,991 | 36,418 | Thiès |
| 17 | Kaffrine | 16,957 | 25,768 | 31,298 | Kaolack |
| 18 | Dahra | N/A | 26,486 | 29,495 | Louga |
| 19 | Bignona | 22,237 | 25,477 | 26,707 | Ziguinchor |
| 20 | Fatick | 18,416 | 23,149 | 26,117 | Fatick |
| 21 | Dagana | 15,638 | 18,205 | 25,604 | Saint-Louis |
| 22 | Bambey | 16,974 | 21,250 | 24,319 | Diourbel |
| 23 | Vélingara | 14,068 | 20,806 | 23,834 | Kolda |
| 24 | Sédhiou | 13,212 | 18,465 | 20,200 | Kolda |
| 25 | Sébikhotane | N/A | 18,582 | 19,429 | Dakar |
| 26 | Kédougou | 11,216 | 16,672 | 18,483 | Kédougou |
| 27 | Nguékhokh | N/A | 16,911 | 18,384 | Thiès |
| 28 | Kayar | N/A | 16,257 | 17,193 | Thiès |
| 29 | Pout | 10,763 | 16,785 | 17,072 | Thiès |
| 30 | Mékhé | 12,109 | 15,291 | 15,527 | Thiès |
| 31 | Matam | 10,722 | 14,620 | 15,306 | Matam |
| 32 | Ouro Sogui | N/A | 13,177 | 15,200 | Matam |
| 33 | Nioro du Rip | 11,841 | 13,976 | 15,039 | Kaolack |
| 34 | Kébémer | 8,120 | 14,438 | 14,747 | Louga |
| 35 | Koungheul | 10,256 | 14,029 | 13,435 | Kaolack |
| 36 | Guinguinéo | 12,887 | 12,973 | 12,784 | Fatick |
| 37 | Bakel | 7,959 | 10,653 | 12,758 | Tambacounda |
| 38 | Mboro | N/A | 11,809 | 12,647 | Thiès |
| 39 | Linguère | 9,824 | 11,667 | 12,607 | Louga |
| 40 | Sokone | 8,552 | 11,124 | 12,472 | Fatick |
| 41 | Goudomp | N/A | 11,013 | 12,342 | Kolda |
| 42 | Thiadiaye | 64 | 10,262 | 12,010 | Thiès |
| 43 | Ndioum | N/A | 12,407 | 11,964 | Saint-Louis |
| 44 | Diamniadio | N/A | 10,898 | 11,393 | Dakar |
| 45 | Khombole | 9,437 | 11,574 | 11,624 | Thiès |
| 46 | Gossas | 9,289 | 10,548 | 10,468 | Fatick |
| 47 | Kanel | N/A | 8,997 | 10,165 | Matam |

== Other settlements ==
- Agnam-Goly
- Balandine
- Bapate
- Bembou
- Bessir
- Boukitingho
- Cap Skirring
- Guédiawaye
- Kidira
- Pikine
- Podor
- Yoff

== See also ==
- List of settlements in Senegal
