= Communes of Senegal =

Fourth-level administrative divisions in Senegal

The Communes of Senegal are the fourth-level administrative divisions in Senegal (below country, region and department). There are some 121 communes in Senegal which have urban status (communes de ville), apart from 46 communes d'arrondissement in the large towns and 370 rural communities (communautés rurales) in the countryside.

== History ==
The communes of Saint-Louis and Gorée were established on 10 August 1872, followed by Rufisque and Dakar, created in 1880 and 1887 respectively. The inhabitants of these Four Communes enjoyed a privileged legal status. These first communes, known as communes de plein exercice (full communes), were modelled directly on the French commune.

Other towns, however, such as Thiès, Kaolack and Ziguinchor, grew increasingly important both demographically — they were more populous than Gorée or Rufisque — and economically. A decree of 1891 opened the possibility of promoting them to the rank of communes mixtes (mixed communes), as distinct from the full communes. The following were created as mixed communes: Thiès, Louga and Tivaouane (1904); Ziguinchor (1907); Mekhe (1911); Fatick, Foundiougne and Kaolack (1917); Diourbel (1918); Kébémer and Khombole (1925); Bambey, Mbour and Gossas (1926). Initially only towns in the coastal region could become mixed communes, but these provisions were extended to all colonies of French West Africa (AOF) in 1929. These communes were administered by an appointed mayor-administrator and a municipal commission — rather than an elected municipal council — whose members were appointed by the Governor until 1939, after which they were elected. A further wave of creations followed in 1952 with Kolda, Mbacké, Guinguinéo, Tambacounda, Matam and Podor.

The law of 18 November 1955 on the reorganisation of municipal government in French West Africa marked a decisive step in the decentralisation process: it reorganised the original four communes, established communes de moyen exercice (intermediate communes) with an appointed mayor-administrator and an elected municipal council, and elevated other localities to the status of full communes.

At independence in 1960, Senegal had 34 communes, all of full status. In 1961, following Gorée's absorption into Dakar, this number fell to 33.

Law No. 66-64 of 30 June 1966 defined the Municipal Administration Code and, in its Article 3, stipulated that a commune is any locality with a population of at least 1,000 inhabitants that has reached a level of development allowing it to balance its own budget from its own resources. (Note: Organisation administrative et territoriale du Sénégal de 1960 à nos jours [Administrative and Territorial Organisation of Senegal from 1960 to the Present], http://www.muat.gouv.sn/1960.htm) Communes are considered legal persons under public law. At that date, the 33 communes were, in alphabetical order: Bakel, Bambey, Bignona, Dagana, Dakar, Diourbel, Fatick, Foundiougne, Gossas, Guinguinéo, Joal-Fadiouth, Kaolack, Kaffrine, Kébémer, Kédougou, Khombole, Kolda, Linguère, Louga, Matam, Mbacké, Mbour, Meckhé, Nioro du Rip, Oussouye, Podor, Saint-Louis, Sédhiou, Tambacounda, Thiès, Tivaouane, Vélingara and Ziguinchor.

In 1983, Decree No. 83-1128 created three communes in place of the former commune of Dakar: Dakar, Pikine and Rufisque. In 1990, Decree No. 90-1134 of 8 October 1990 separated Guédiawaye and Bargny from Pikine and Rufisque respectively, establishing them as independent communes. Decree No. 90-1135 of 8 October 1990 created nine further communes: Dahra, Koungheul, Ourossogui, Ndioum, Thionck Essyl, Goudomp, Marsassoum, Diofior and Pout.

Law No. 96-752 of 5 September 1996 created 12 additional communes: Kahone, Passy, Gandiaye, Ndoffane Laghème, Thilogne, Waoundé, Kanel, Golléré, Semmé, Nguékhokh, Thiadiaye and Sébikotane.

Decree No. 2002-171 of 21 February 2002 created seven further communes — Diamniadio, Mboro, Kayar, Ranérou, Rosso, Diawara and Ndiandane — bringing the total number of urban communes to 67.

Decree No. 2008-748 of 10 July 2008 (Note: Decree No. 2008-748 of 10 July 2008 on the creation of communes in the regions of Fatick, Kaffrine, Kaolack, Kédougou, Kolda, Louga, Matam, Saint-Louis, Sédhiou, Tambacounda, Thiès and Ziguinchor, Journal officiel de la République du Sénégal [Official Journal of the Republic of Senegal], No. 6446 of 31 December 2008) significantly increased the number of communes — now 108 — with 41 new creations: Karang Poste, Soum, Nganda, Birkelane, Malem Hodar, Keur Madiabel, Saraya, Salémata, Médina Yoro Foulah, Pata, Dabo, Salikégné, Saré Yoba Diéga, Kounkané, Diaobé-Kabendou, Guéoul, Sinthiou Bamambé-Banadji, Dembancané, Hamady Ounaré, Mpal, Ross Béthio, Gaé, Mboumba, Guédé Chantier, Démette, Galoya Toucouleur, Diannah Malary, Samine, Tanaff, Diattacounda, Bounkiling, Madina Wandifa, Kidira, Goudiry, Kothiary, Koumpentoum, Saly Portudal, Ngaparou, Somone, Popenguine-Ndayane and Diouloulou.

Six months later, on 31 December 2008 — just weeks before the local elections of 22 March 2009 — five further localities were communalised by decree, on account of their economic potential, geographic position and demographic size: (Note: Decree No. 2008-1496 of 31 December 2008, Journal officiel de la République du Sénégal [Official Journal of the Republic of Senegal], No. 6446 of 31 December 2008) one in the Koumpentoum Department, Malem Niani, and four in the Podor Department: Aéré Lao, Pété, Walaldé and Bodé Lao.

From that point, Senegal had 113 so-called communes de ville (urban communes), in addition to 46 communes d'arrondissement for the largest cities.

In 2013 Senegal passed Act III of Decentralization, which abolished rural communities, and transformed all rural, urban and arrodissements communes into simply communes.

== Dakar Region ==
=== Dakar Department ===
- Biscuiterie
- Cambérène
- Colobane / Fass / Gueule Tapée
- Dakar-Plateau
- Dieuppeul-Derklé
- Fann-Point E-Amitié
- Gorée
- Grand Dakar
- Grand Yoff
- Hann Bel-Air
- HLM
- Médina
- Mermoz-Sacré-Cœur
- Ngor
- Ouakam
- Parcelles Assainies
- Patte d'Oie
- Sicap-Liberté
- Yoff

=== Guédiawaye Department ===
- Golf Sud
- Médina Gounass
- Ndiarème Limamoulaye
- Sam Notaire
- Wakhinane Nimzatt

=== Pikine Department ===
- Dalifort
- Diacksao
- Diamaguène / Sicap Mbao
- Djidah Thiaroye Kaw
- Guinaw Rail Nord
- Guinaw Rail Sud
- Mbao
- Pikine Est
- Pikine Ouest
- Pikine Sud
- Thiaroye-Gare
- Thiaroye-sur-Mer

=== Rufisque Department ===
- Bambylor
- Bargny
- Diamniadio
- Rufisque Est
- Rufisque Nord
- Rufisque Ouest
- Sangalkam
- Sébikhotane
- Sendou
- Tivaouane Peulh-Niaga
- Yène

=== Keur Massar Department ===
- Jaxaay-Parcelles
- Keur Massar Nord
- Keur Massar Sud
- Malika
- Yeumbeul Nord
- Yeumbeul Sud

== Diourbel Region ==
=== Bambey Department ===
- Baba Garage
- Bambey
- Dinguiraye
- Gawane
- Keur Samba Kane
- Lambaye
- Ndangalma
- Ndondol
- Ngogom
- Ngoye
- Réfane
- Thiakhar

=== Diourbel Department ===
- Diourbel
- Gade Escale
- Keur Ngalgou
- Dankh Sène
- Ndindy
- Ndoulo
- Ngohé
- Patar
- Taïba Moutoupha
- Tocky-Gare
- Touba Lappé
- Touré Mbonde

=== Mbacké Department ===
- Dalla Ngabou
- Darou Nahim
- Darou Salam Typ
- Dendey Gouyegui
- Kael
- Madina
- Mbacké
- Missirah
- Ndioumane
- Nghaye
- Sadio
- Taïba Thiékène
- Taïf
- Touba Fall
- Touba Mboul
- Touba Mosquée

== Fatick Region ==
=== Fatick Department ===
- Diakhao
- Diaoulé
- Diarrère
- Diofior
- Diouroup
- Djilasse
- Fatick
- Fimela
- Loul Séssène
- Mbéllacadiao
- Ndiob
- Ngayokhème
- Niakhar
- Palmarin
- Patar
- Tattaguine
- Thiaré Ndialgui

=== Foundiougne Department ===
- Bassoul
- Diagane Barka
- Dionewar
- Diossong
- Djilor
- Djirnda
- Foundiougne
- Karang Poste
- Keur Saloum Diané
- Keur Samba Guèye
- Mbam
- Niassène
- Nioro Alassane Tall
- Passy
- Sokone
- Soum
- Toubacouta

=== Gossas Department ===
- Colobane
- Gossas
- Mbar
- Ndiène Lagane
- Ouadiour
- Patar Lia

== Kaffrine Region ==
=== Birkelane Department ===
- Birkilane
- Diamal
- Keur Mboucki
- Mabo
- Mbeuleup
- Ndiognick
- Ségré Gatta
- Touba Mbella

=== Kaffrine Department ===
- Boulel
- Diamagadio
- Diokoul Mbelbouck
- Gniby
- Kaffrine
- Kahi
- Kathiotte
- Médinatoul Salam II
- Nganda

=== Koungheul Department ===
- Fass Thiékène
- Ida Mouride
- Koungheul
- Lour Escale
- Maka Yop
- Missirah Wadène
- Gainte Pathé
- Ribot Escale
- Saly Escale

=== Malem Hodar Department ===
- Darou Minam 2
- Dianké Souf
- Khelcom
- Malem-Hodar
- Ndiobène Samba Lamo
- Ndioum Ngainthe
- Sagna

== Kaolack Region ==
=== Guinguinéo Department ===
- Dara Mboss
- Fass
- Gagnick
- Guinguinéo
- Khelcom Birane
- Mbadakhoune
- Mboss
- Ndiago
- Ngathe Naoudé
- Nguélou
- Ourour
- Panal Wolof

=== Kaolack Department ===
- Dya
- Gandiaye
- Kahone
- Kaolack
- Keur Baka
- Latmingué
- Ndiaffate
- Ndiébel
- Ndiédieng
- Ndofane
- Sibassor
- Thiaré
- Thiomby

=== Nioro du Rip Department ===
- Dabaly
- Darou Salam
- Gainthe Kaye
- Kayemor
- Keur Maba Diakhou
- Keur Madiabel
- Keur Madongo
- Keur Socé
- Médina Sabakh
- Ndramé Escale
- Ngayène
- Nioro du Rip
- Paoskoto
- Porokhane
- Taïba Niassène
- Wack Ngouna

== Kédougou Region ==
=== Kédougou Department ===
- Bandafassi
- Dimboli
- Dindefelo
- Fongolimbi
- Kédougou
- Ninéfécha
- Tomboroncoto

=== Salémata Department ===
- Dar Salam
- Ethiolo
- Oubadji
- Salémata

=== Saraya Department ===
- Bembou
- Dakateli
- Kévoye
- Khossanto
- Médina Baffé
- Missirah Sirimana
- Sabodala
- Saraya

== Kolda Region ==
=== Kolda Department ===
- Bagadadji
- Coumbacara
- Dabo
- Dialambéré
- Dioulacolon
- Guiro Yéro Bocar
- Kolda
- Mampatim
- Médina Chérif
- Médina El Hadj
- Salikégné
- Saré Bidji
- Saré Yoba Diéga
- Tankanto Escale
- Thiétty

=== Médina Yoro Foulah Department ===
- Bignarabé
- Bourouco
- Dinguiraye
- Kéréwane
- Koulinto
- Médina Yoro Foulah
- Ndorna
- Niaming
- Pata

=== Vélingara Department ===
- Badion
- Bonconto
- Diaobé-Kabendou
- Fafacourou
- Kandia
- Kandiaye
- Kounkané
- Linkéring
- Médina Gounass
- Némataba
- Ouassadou
- Pakour
- Paroumba
- Saré Coly Sallé
- Sinthiang Koundara
- Vélingara

== Louga Region ==
=== Kébémer Department ===
- Bandegne Ouolof
- Darou Marnane
- Darou Mousty
- Diokoul Diawrigne
- Guéoul
- Kab Gaye
- Kanène Ndiob
- Kébémer
- Loro
- Mbacké Cajor
- Mbadiane
- Ndande
- Ndoyene
- Ngourane Ouolof
- Sagatta Gueth
- Sam Yabal
- Thieppe
- Thiolom Fall
- Touba Mérina

=== Linguère Department ===
- Affé Djoloff
- Barkédji
- Boulal
- Dahra
- Dealy
- Dodji
- Gassane
- Kamb
- Labgar
- Linguère
- Mbeuleukhé
- Mboula
- Ouarkhokh
- Sagatta Djolof
- Téssékéré Forage
- Thiamène Djolof
- Thiarny
- Thiel
- Yang-Yang

=== Louga Department ===
- Coki
- Gande
- Guet Ardo
- Kéle Gueye
- Keur Momar Sarr
- Léona
- Louga
- Mbédiène
- Ndiagne
- Nguer Malal
- Ngueune Sarr
- Nguidilé
- Niomré
- Pété Ouarack
- Sakal
- Syer
- Thiamène Cayor

== Matam Region ==
=== Kanel Department ===
- Aouré
- Bokiladji
- Dembancané
- Hamady Ounaré
- Kanel
- Ndendory
- Odobéré
- Orkadiere
- Semmé
- Sinthiou Bamambé-Banadji
- Waoundé
- Wouro Sidy

=== Matam Department ===
- Agnams
- Bokidiawé
- Dabia
- Matam
- Nabadji Civol
- Nguidjilone
- Ogo
- Oréfondé
- Ourossogui
- Thilogne

=== Ranérou Ferlo Department ===
- Lougré Thioly
- Oudalaye
- Ranérou
- Vélingara

== Saint-Louis Region ==
=== Dagana Department ===
- Bokhol
- Dagana
- Diama
- Gaé
- Mbane
- Ndombo Sandjiry
- Ngnith
- Richard-Toll
- Ronkh
- Ross Béthio
- Rosso

=== Podor Department ===
- Aéré Lao
- Bodé Lao
- Boké Dialloubé
- Démette
- Dodel
- Doumga Lao
- Fanaye
- Galoya Toucouleur
- Gamadji Saré
- Golléré
- Guédé Chantier
- Guédé Village
- Madina Diathbé
- Mbolo Birane
- Mboumba
- Méry
- Ndiandane
- Ndiayène Peindao
- Ndioum
- Pété
- Podor
- Walaldé

=== Saint-Louis Department ===
- Fass Ngom
- Gandon
- Mpal
- Ndiébène Gandiole
- Saint-Louis

== Sédhiou Region ==
=== Bounkiling Department ===
- Bona
- Bounkiling
- Diacounda
- Diambati
- Diaroumé
- Djinany
- Faoune
- Inor
- Kandion Mangana
- Madina Wandifa
- Ndiamacouta
- Ndiamalathiel
- Tankon

=== Goudomp Department ===
- Baghère
- Diattacounda
- Diouboudou
- Djibanar
- Goudomp
- Kaour
- Karantaba
- Kolibantang
- Mangaroungou Santo
- Niagha
- Samine
- Simbandi Balante
- Simbandi Brassou
- Tanaff
- Yarang Balante

=== Sédhiou Department ===
- Bambaly
- Bémet Bidjini
- Boghall
- Diannah Ba
- Diannah Malary
- Diendé
- Djibabouya
- Djiredji
- Koussy
- Marsassoum
- Oudoucar
- Sakar
- Sama Kanta Peulh
- Sansamba
- Sédhiou

== Tambacounda Region ==
=== Bakel Department ===
- Bakel
- Ballou
- Bélé
- Diawara
- Gabou
- Gathiary
- Kidira
- Madina Foulbé
- Moudéry
- Sadatou
- Sinthiou Fissa
- Toumboura

=== Goudiry Department ===
- Bala
- Bani Israël
- Boutoucoufara
- Boynguel Bamba
- Dianké Makha
- Dougué
- Goumbayél
- Goudiry
- Koar
- Komoti
- Kothiary
- Koulor
- Koussan
- Sinthiou Bocar Ali
- Sinthiou Mamadou Boubou

=== Koumpentoum Department ===
- Bamba Thialène
- Kahène
- Koumpentoum
- Kouthia Gaydi
- Kouthiaba Wolof
- Malem Niani
- Méréto
- Ndame
- Niani Toucouleur
- Pass Koto
- Payar
- Sinthiou Malème

=== Tambacounda Department ===
- Dialacoto
- Koussanar
- Makacolibantang
- Missirah
- Ndoga Babacar
- Néttéboulou
- Tambacounda

== Thiès Region ==
=== M'bour Department ===
- Diass
- Fissel
- Joal-Fadiouth
- M'Bour
- Malicounda
- Ndiaganiao
- Ngaparou
- Nguékhokh
- Nguéniène
- Popenguine-Ndayane
- Saly
- Sandiara
- Séssène
- Sindia
- Somone
- Thiadiaye

=== Thiès Department ===
- Diender
- Fandène
- Kayar
- Keur Moussa
- Khombole
- Ndiéyène Sirah
- Ngoudiane
- Notto
- Pout
- Tassette
- Thiénaba
- Thiès Est
- Thiès Nord
- Thiès Ouest
- Touba Toul
- Yaboyabo

=== Tivaouane Department ===
- Chérif Lo
- Darou Khoudoss
- Koul
- Mbayène
- Mboro
- Meckhe
- Méouane
- Mérina Dakhar
- Mont Rolland
- Ngandiouf
- Niakhene
- Notto Gouye Diama
- Pambal
- Pékèsse
- Pire Goureye
- Taïba Ndiaye
- Thilmakha
- Tivaouane

== Ziguinchor Region ==
=== Bignona Department ===
- Balinghore
- Bignona
- Boutoupa-Camaracounda
- Diégoune
- Diouloulou
- Djibidione
- Djinaky
- Kafountine
- Kartiack
- Kataba 1
- Mangagoulack
- Niamone
- Oulampane
- Ouonck
- Sindian
- Suelle
- Tenghory
- Thionck Essyl

=== Oussouye Department ===
- Diembéring
- Enampore
- Mlomp
- Oukout
- Oussouye
- Santhiaba Manjacque

=== Ziguinchor Department ===
- Adéane
- Coubalan
- Niaguis
- Nyassia
- Ziguinchor

== See also ==
- Rural communities of Senegal
