= Ogo =

Ogo or OGO may refer to:

== Places ==
- Ogo, Senegal (disambiguation)
  - Ogo, Diourbel
  - Ogo, Louga
  - Ogo (arrondissement), Matam, Matam
- Ogo Mountains, Somaliland, Somalia
- Ōgo, Gunma, Japan; a town in Seta, Gunma
  - Ōgo Station, Maebashi, Gunma, Japan; a train station
- Abengourou Airport (IATA airport code OGO), Abengourou, Ivory Coast

== People ==
- Ogo, historical variant spelling of Hugh (given name)
- Oeyo aka Ogō (1573–1626), Japanese widow of the Shogun
- Misael H. Ogo (born 1984), North Mariana Islands politician
- Suzuka Ogo (born 1993), Japanese actress
- Yūya Ogō (born 1996), Japanese baseball player
- Ogo Adegboye (born 1987), Nigerian basketball player

=== Fictional characters ===
- Ogo, a character in Robot and Monster
- Ogo, a character from Gogs

== Plants ==
- Ogonori, a form of edible seaweed
- Ogo (Gracilaria parvispora), a red algae
- Ogo, a pitcher plant cultivar; see List of Nepenthes cultivars

== Other uses ==
- Khana language (ISO 639 language code ogo)
- Outdoor Gravity Orb, a form of zorbing
- Ogo (handheld device)
- Orbiting Geophysical Observatory, a series of satellites
- OpenGroupware.org
- Open Government, a government agency of the U.S. state of Washington; see List of Washington state agencies
