= Ogo, Senegal =

Ogo, Senegal may refer to:

- Ogo (arrondissement), an arrondissement of Matam, Senegal
- Ogo, Diourbel, a village in Diourbel Region, Senegal
- Ogo, Louga, a village in Louga Region, Senegal

== See also ==
- Ogo (disambiguation)
