= Malem Niani =

- Town and commune
- Location in Senegal
- Coordinates: 13°56′N 14°18′W
- Country: Senegal
- Region: Tambacounda
- Department: Koumpentoum

Area
  - Town and commune: 2.409 km^{2} (0.930 sq mi)

Population (2023 census)
  - Town and commune: 4,455
  - Density: 1,849/km^{2} (4,790/sq mi)
- Time zone: UTC+0 (GMT)

Malem Niany is a small town and urban commune in the Tambacounda Region of central Senegal. In 2013 it had a population of some 2,000

== Transport ==
It lies alongside the N1 road between Koumpentoum and Tambacounda and is also served by a station on the national railway network.

== See also ==
- Railway stations in Senegal
