= Kidira =

- Town and commune
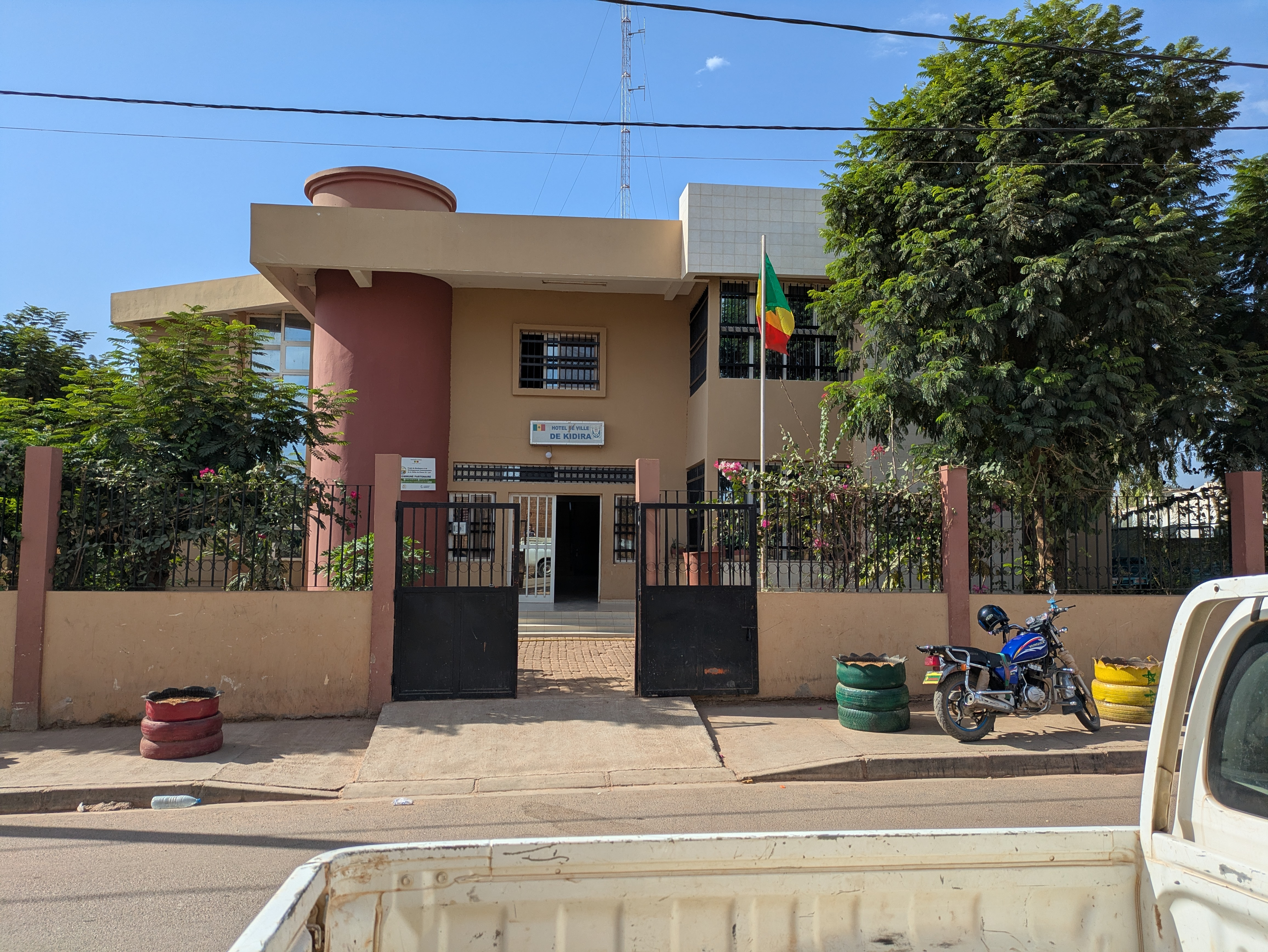
- The hotel de ville

- Location within Senegal
- Coordinates: 14°25′N 12°15′W
- Country: Senegal
- Region: Tambacounda
- Department: Bakel

Area
  - Town and commune: 4.545 km^{2} (1.755 sq mi)

Population (2023 census)
  - Town and commune: 13,551
  - Density: 2,982/km^{2} (7,722/sq mi)
- Time zone: UTC+0 (GMT)

Kidira is a town and urban commune in Tambacounda Region of eastern Senegal, lying near the Malian border. Its population in 2023 was 13,551.

== Geography ==
Kidira is located in eastern Senegal on the Falémé River, which forms part of the border with Mali. Two bridges, a road bridge and a railway bridge, connect the town with Diboli, across the border in Mali. Kidira is located about 600 km east of the capital, Dakar. It is one of three towns in the Bakel Department, along with Bakel and Diawara.

== Climate ==
Temperatures in Kidira can reach 40 °C between March and June due to the Harmattan, dry winds that blow from the east. The southwest monsoon then brings the rainy season in August and September. During the winter months, temperatures are more moderate, averaging around 23 °C. The strong easterly winds contribute significantly to soil erosion in the region.

== Transport ==
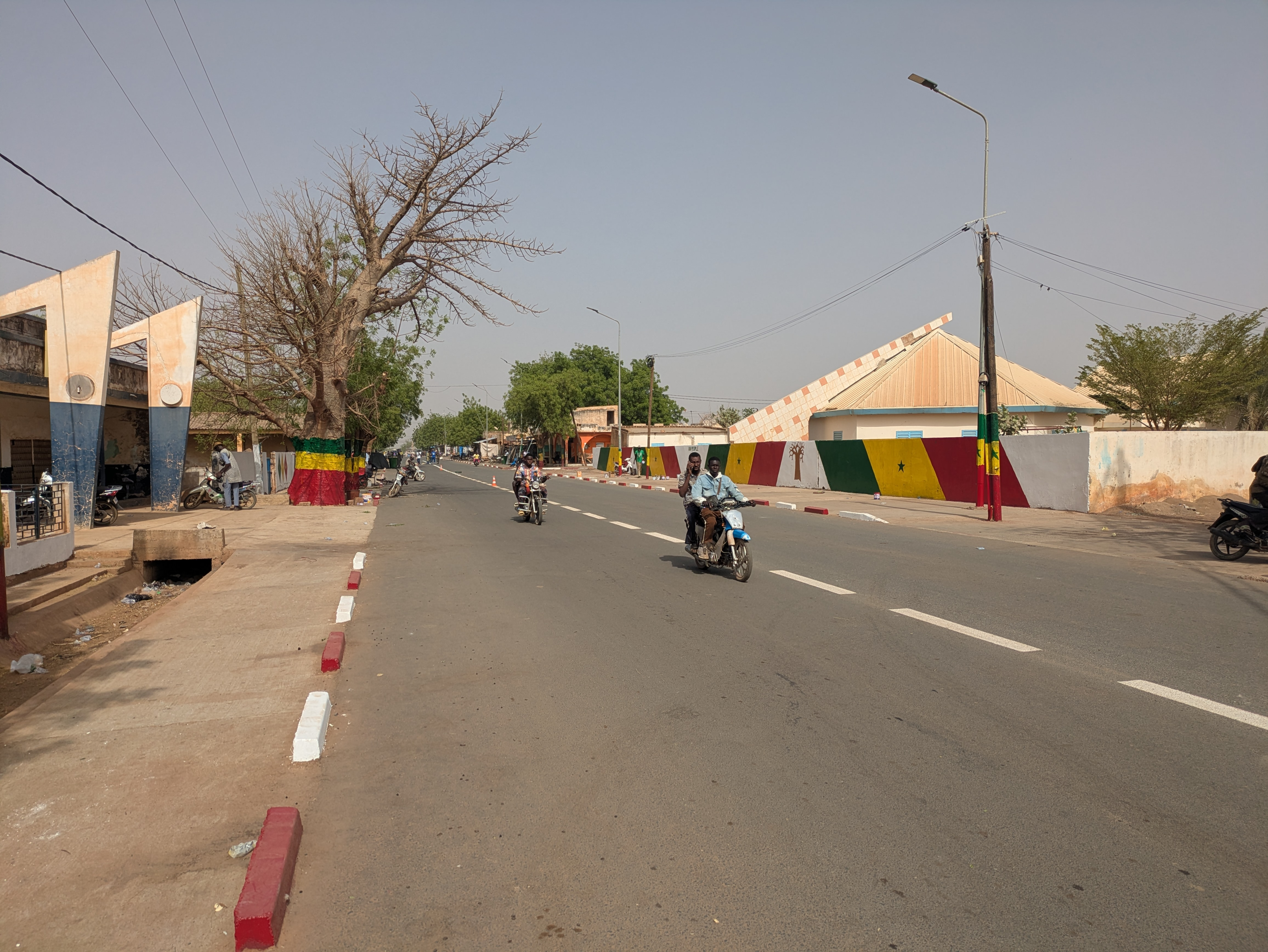
The N2 highway in Kidira

Falémé River at Kidira

Average monthly flow (m^{3}/s) at the Kidira hydrometric station over the period 1904-1984

It is an important transport hub and lies on the N1 and N2 roads, the Dakar – Bamako railway and the Falémé River.

== See also ==
- Railway stations in Senegal
