= List of Senegalese regions by Human Development Index =

This is a list of Regions of Senegal (pre-2008 borders) by Human Development Index as of 2022.

Rank	Region	HDI (2023)
Medium human development
1	Dakar	0.625
2	Ziguinchor	0.606
3	Thiès	0.560
Low human development
–	Senegal (average)	0.530
4	Fatick	0.533
5	Saint-Louis (with Matam)	0.482
6	Kaolack	0.468
7	Kolda	0.467
8	Tambacounda (with Kédougou)	0.450
9	Louga	0.466
10	Diourbel	0.437

== See also ==
- List of countries by Human Development Index
