= Ross Béthio =

- Town and commune
- Location in Senegal
- Coordinates: 16°16′N 16°08′W
- Country: Senegal
- Region: Saint-Louis Region
- Department: Dagana

Area
  - Town and commune: 3.07 km^{2} (1.19 sq mi)

Population (2023 census)
  - Town and commune: 16,225
  - Density: 5,290/km^{2} (13,700/sq mi)
- Time zone: UTC+0 (GMT)

Ross Béthio is a town of commune status in the Dagana Department in Saint-Louis Region of Senegal. The population in 2023 was 16,225.

The town lies on the N2 road connecting it to Saint-Louis and Dakar to the west and Richard Toll to the east.

The local economy is based on the growing of rice on land irrigated by water from the River Senegal and the subsequent manufacture of energy from the rice husks by biomass gasification.
