= Merinaghen =

Merinaghen, Senegal
- Town
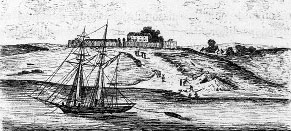
- The Fort at Merinaghen, engraving c. 1890

- Location within Senegal
- Coordinates: 15°58′0″N 15°57′0″W
- Country: Senegal
- Region: Saint-Louis Region
- Time zone: UTC+0 (GMT)

Merinaghen (also Merinaghem or Merinaguene) is a locality in Northwest Senegal. A fort was built there in 1822 to facilitate trade along the Sénégal River, and a village survives to this day.
