= Diawara, Senegal =

Diawara
- Town and commune
- Location in Senegal
- Coordinates: 15°2′N 12°33′W
- Country: Senegal
- Region: Tambacounda
- Department: Bakel

Area
  - Town and commune: 3.666 km^{2} (1.415 sq mi)

Population (2023 census)
  - Town and commune: 12,147
  - Density: 3,313/km^{2} (8,582/sq mi)
- Time zone: UTC+0 (GMT)

Diawara is a town and urban commune in Tambacounda Region of eastern Senegal, lying in the Senegal river valley near the Malian border. Its population in 2023 was 12,147.

Diawara is twinned with the French commune of Longvic on the Côte d'Or.

== See also ==
- Railway stations in Senegal
