= Mbar, Senegal =

Mbar
- Town and commune
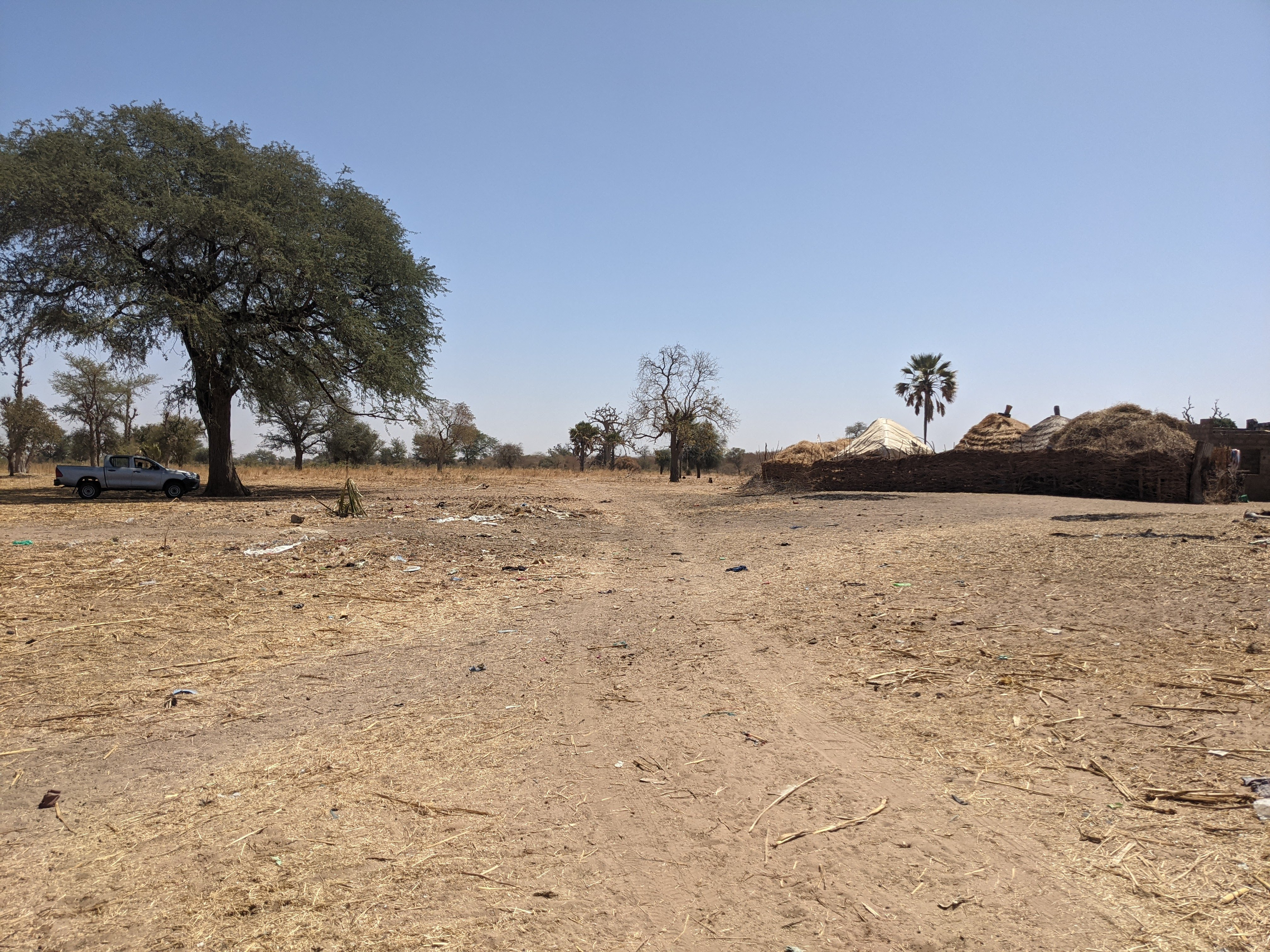
- A hamlet in Mbar Commune

- Location in Senegal
- Coordinates: 14.537°N 15.758°W
- Country: Senegal
- Region: Fatick Region
- Department: Gossas
- Arrondissement: Colobane

Area
  - Town and commune: 376 km^{2} (145 sq mi)

Population (2023 census)
  - Town and commune: 36,318
  - Density: 96.6/km^{2} (250/sq mi)
- Time zone: UTC+0 (GMT)

Mbar is a town and commune located in the Fatick Region of Senegal.
