= Diofior =

- Town and commune
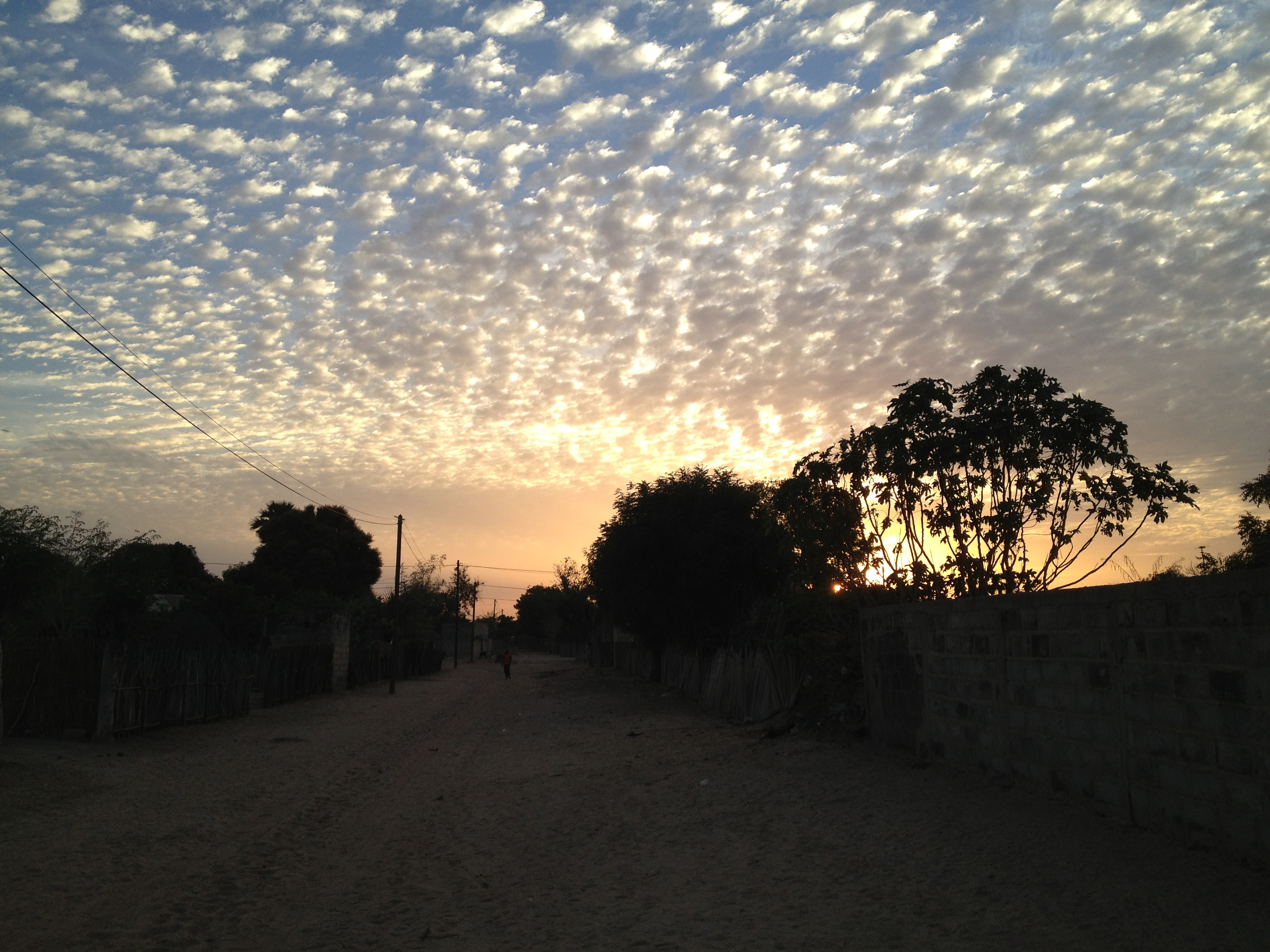
- Night view of the town of Diofior

- Location within Senegal
- Coordinates: 14.18866°N 16.66103°W
- Country: Senegal
- Region: Fatick Region
- Department: Fatick Department

Area
  - Town and commune: 5.917 km^{2} (2.285 sq mi)

Population (2023 census)
  - Town and commune: 12,795
  - Density: 2,162/km^{2} (5,601/sq mi)

Diofior (or Dioffior) is a town and urban commune in Fatick Department in Senegal.
