= Mpal, Senegal =

- Town and commune
- Location within Senegal
- Coordinates: 15°55′N 16°16′W
- Country: Senegal
- Region: Saint-Louis Region
- Department: Saint-Louis

Area
  - Town and commune: 2.679 km^{2} (1.034 sq mi)
- Elevation: 20 m (66 ft)

Population (2023 census)
  - Town and commune: 11,025
  - Density: 4,115/km^{2} (10,660/sq mi)
- Time zone: UTC+0 (GMT)

Mpal is a town and urban commune in Saint-Louis Region in north-western Senegal. It lies on a branch railway of the Senegal Railway system.

== See also ==
- Railway stations in Senegal
