= Ndiaffate =

- Town and commune
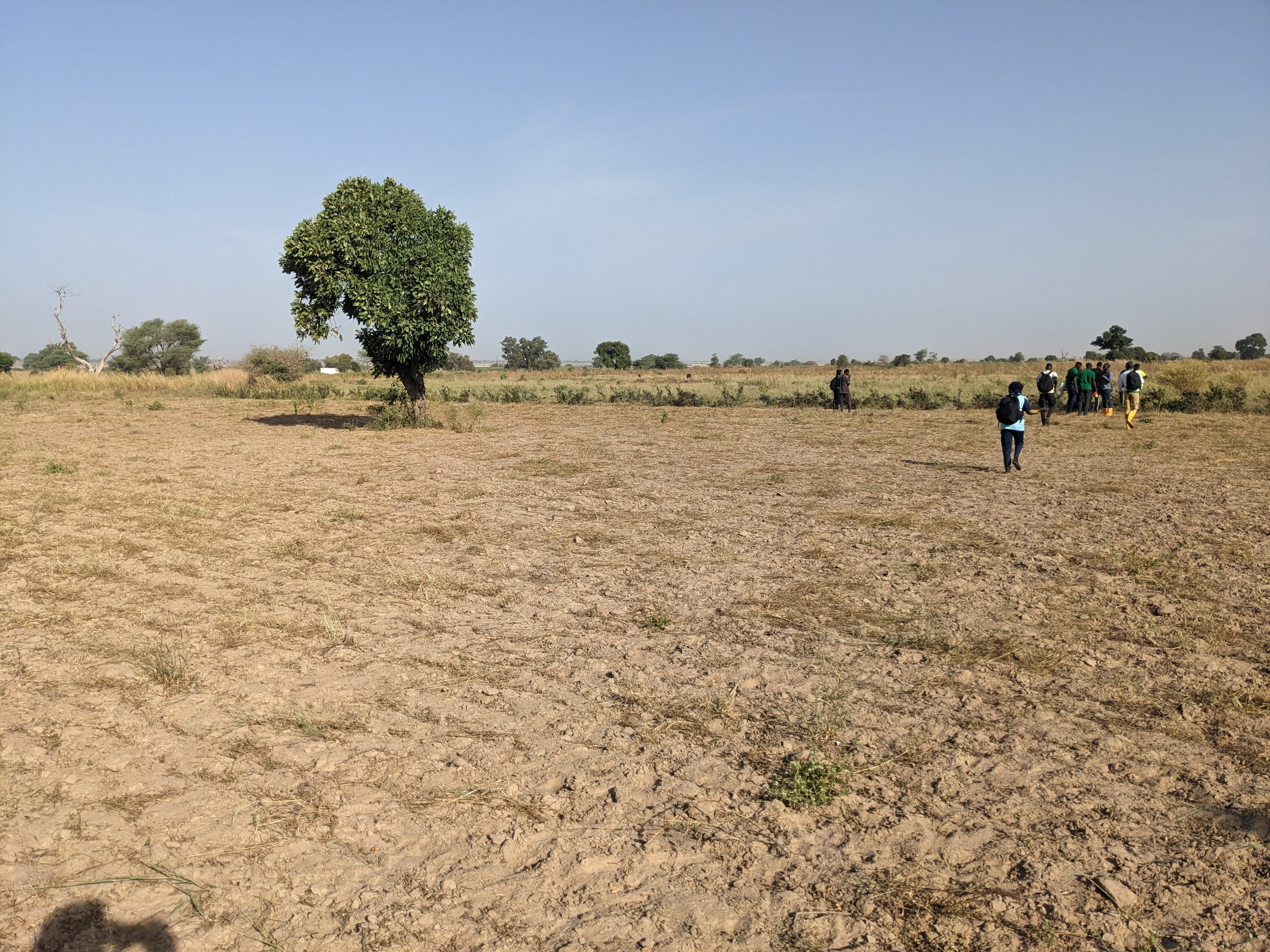
- Agricultural landscape near Ndiaffate

- Location within Senegal
- Coordinates: 14.0804°N 16.1699°W
- Country: Senegal
- Region: Kaolack Region
- Department: Kaolack
- Arrondissement: Ndiedieng

Area
  - Town and commune: 322.8 km^{2} (124.6 sq mi)

Population (2023 census)
  - Town and commune: 49,493
  - Density: 153.3/km^{2} (397.1/sq mi)

Ndiaffate is a town and commune in the Department of Kaolack, central Senegal.
