= Hôtel de ville =

In French, a hôtel de ville (pronounced [otɛl də vil]) is a town hall or city hall.

Hôtel de ville may also refer to:

== Buildings ==
Belgium

- Hôtel de Ville, Brussels
- Hôtel de Ville, Liège

Canada

- Hôtel de Ville, Montréal
- Hôtel de Ville, Québec City

France

Luxembourg

- Hôtel de Ville, Luxembourg City

== Transit stations ==
France

- Hôtel de Ville tram stop, Bordeaux
- Hôtel de Ville–Louis Pradel station, Lyon Metro
- Hôtel de Ville station, Paris Metro
