= M'bour department =

Coordinates: 14°27′09″N 17°08′15″W

M'bour
- Department
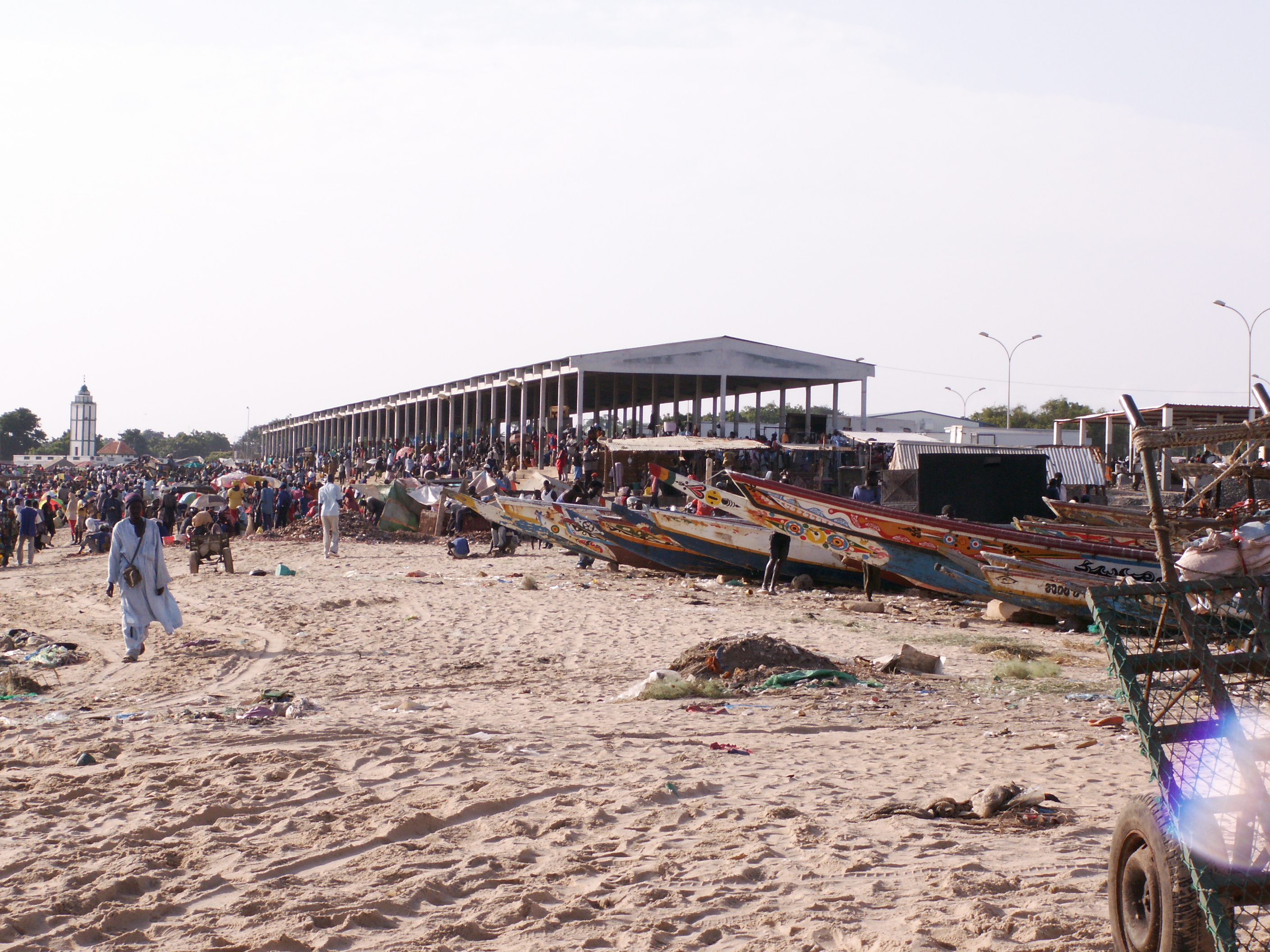

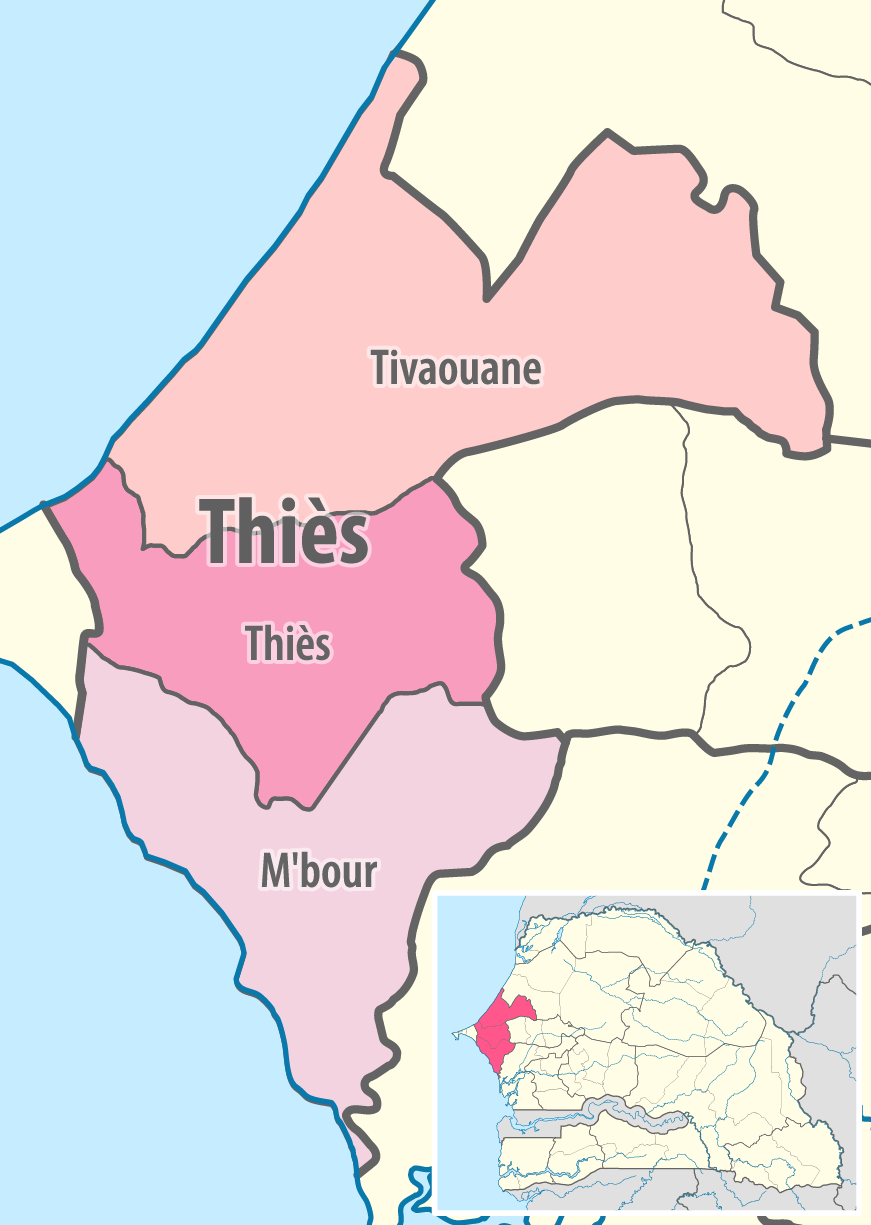
- Location in the Thiès region
- Country: Senegal
- Region: Thiès region
- Capital: M'bour

Area
  - Total: 1,607 km^{2} (620 sq mi)

Population (2023 census)
  - Total: 937,189
  - Density: 583.2/km^{2} (1,510/sq mi)
- Time zone: UTC+0 (GMT)

M'bour department is one of the 46 departments of Senegal, one of three in the Thiès region. Its capital is M'Bour.

The department has 8 urban communes; Joal-Fadiouth, Mbour, Nguékhokh, Thiadiaye, Saly Portudal, Ngaparou, Somone and Popenguine.

In 2018, the Senegalese-American musician Akon announced his plan for the construction of Akon City, a planned urban city in the department. After a brief phase of construction in 2023, the plan was abandoned, only resulting in a partially built welcome centre.

== Rural districts ==
The rural districts (communautés rurales) are:

- Arrondissement of Fissel:
  - Fissel
  - Ndiaganiao
- Arrondissement of Séssène:
  - Séssène
  - Nguéniène
- Arrondissement de Sindia:
  - Sindia
  - Malicounda
  - Diass

== Historic sites ==
- Residence at Popenguine and the Cap de Naze
- Tumuli of the forest of Bandia
- Church and Sanctuary of Popenguine
- Fadiouth Island, Cemetery Island and Granaries on stilts
- Fort of the Comptoir of Saly Portudal
- Thiémassas prehistoric site
- Little Seminary of Ngazobil
- Senghor family house at Joal
- Ndianda church
- Sangomar, place of the Sereer cult, at Palmarin
- Fangool and cannon at Mbalamson
- Sereer Tumulus of Mbafaye at Godaguène Fissel
