= Bessir =

- Interactive map of Bessir
- Country: Senegal
- Time zone: UTC+0 (GMT)

Bessir is a settlement in Senegal.
