= Sadio =

Sadio is a West African masculine given name and surname. Notable people with the name include:

== Given names ==
- Sadio Ba (born 1973), Belgian football player and manager
- Sadio Camara (1979–2026), Malian military officer and politician
- Sadio Demba (born 1965), Senegalese football manager
- Sadio Diallo (born 1990), Guinean footballer
- Sadio Doucouré (born 1992), French-Malian basketball player
- Sadio Doumbia (born 1990), French tennis player
- Sadio Gassama (born 1954), Malian brigadier general
- Sadio Kanouté (born 1996), Malian footballer
- Sadio Mané (born 1992), Senegalese footballer
- Sadio Sankharé (born 1981), French footballer
- Sadio Sow (born 1976), Senegalese footballer
- Sadio Lamine Sow (born 1952), Malian politician
- Sadio Tounkara (born 1992), Malian footballer

== Surnames ==
- Claude Sadio (born 1943), Senegalese basketball player
- Diao Sadio (born 1990), Senegalese footballer
- Lamine Sadio (born 2007), Senegalese footballer

== See also ==
- Marie-Sadio Rosche (born 1987), Senegalese basketball player
- Mali Sadio, a legend involving a hippopotamus in Mali
