= Ndiayene Bagana =

- Location in Senegal
- Coordinates: 14°5′N 15°37′W
- Country: Senegal
- Region: Kaolack Region

Ndiayene Bagana is a small town in western-central Senegal. It is located in the Kaolack Region.

Nearby towns and villages include Gama (1.9 nm), Moukhoume (1.9 nm), Kebe Lanim (1.0 nm), Guissam (1.0 nm), Kebe Keur Babou (1.0 nm), Ali Gane (1.0 nm), Keur Deuri (1.0 nm) and Keur Tierno Tala (1.0 nm).
