= Koumpentoum department =

Coordinates: 13°59′N 14°34′W

Koumpentoum
- Department
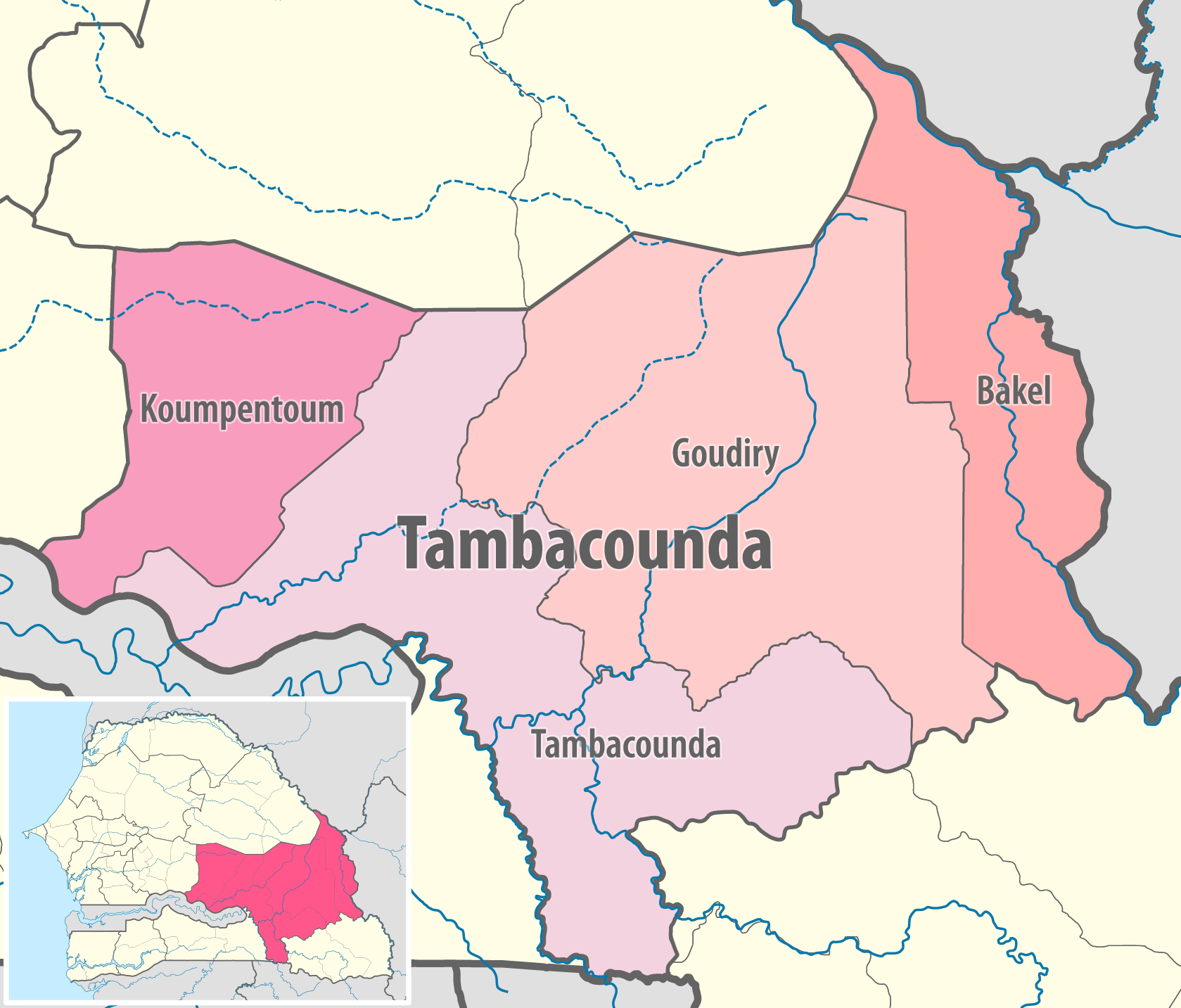
- Country: Senegal
- Region: Tambacounda
- Capital: Koumpentoum

Population (2023 census)
  - Total: 199,457
- Time zone: UTC±00:00 (GMT)

Koumpentoum department is one of the 46 departments of Senegal, located here, one of the four in the Tambacounda Region of east Senegal. It was created in 2008.

The department has two urban communes; Koumpentoum and Malem Niani.

The rest of the department is divided into two arrondissements. In turn, rhey divided into the following rural districts (communautés rurales):

- Bamba Thialène Arrondissement:
  - Ndame
  - Kahène
  - Bamba Thialène
- Kouthiaba Wolof Arrondissement:
  - Kouthia Gaydi
  - Kouthiaba Wolof
  - Pass Koto
  - Payar
