= Aly Oury =

Coordinates: 15°58′N 13°22′W

- Town
- Interactive map of Aly Oury
- Country: Senegal
- Region: Matam
- Department: Matam
- Elevation: 7 m (23 ft)

Population (2002)
  - Total: 1,651
- Time zone: UTC+0 (GMT)

Aly Oury is a small town in Senegal on the left bank of the Senegal River 39 km downstream from Matam in the Daande Maayo area. It had a population of 2,347 people in 2010 and a population of 1,651 according to the 2002 census.

== Administration ==
Aly Oury is part of the rural community of Bokidiawé in the district of Ogo in the heart of Matam department.

== Demography ==
Aly Oury has over 2,500 inhabitants. These are mostly Haalpulaar'en (over 99%) with a minority of Wolof. The population is young and predominantly female. They are exclusively Muslim. Like most villages in the Fouta, Aly Oury is an area of high emigration with the main destinations being: Dakar region, Casamance natural region, West and Central Africa, Western Europe, and the United States.

== Geography ==
The closest towns to Aly Oury are Dondou and Diowol Worgo to the north, Nguiguilone and Sadel to the South.

Due to its geographical position, Aly Oury a Sahelian climate characterized by:

- hot dry continental trade winds or harmattans
- low and erratic rainfall with a rainy season from July to September and a dry season from October to June
- high temperatures

However, the specific hydrological and soil conditions in Aly Oury make it a natural location for irrigated crops.

== Economy ==
Irrigated agriculture, which accounts for nearly 90% of the labour force, remains by far the major socio-economic activity with rice as a lever for local agricultural development. Since the 1970s the village has operated irrigated areas developed by the SAED. The town benefited during the first phase of the Project for Agricultural Development of Matam (PRODAM) through a development of 200 hectares. However, the high cost of inputs, the lack of storage facilities, transport problems, and the isolation of the area severely limited agricultural production despite the enormous potential available to the town.

Inland fishing activity remains firmly rooted in tradition. However, the scarcity of fish and outdated means of production have led to a worrying decline in catches in recent years. This situation has led many fishermen to convert to other income-generating activities.

The extensive grazing activities is, considering the austere nature of the environment, the main production system. Supply of animal feed during the period from March to July is, in this semi-desert area, the main constraint to livestock development. Conflicts between farmers and herders are rare and cattle theft almost non-existent. Revenue from the sale of livestock remains, for many families, a substantial source of income.

The trade that has developed is diverse and is led by the Wolof minority who settled there. However, a few indigenous people, mostly women, are investing more this niche.

== Education ==
As with most of the villages of Fouta, Islamic education is securely anchored. There is also a French school which opened in 1961. Access for girls to school is improving more and more but early marriages are a real obstacle to their continuance. Aly Oury has two elementary schools. In addition, the village has a madrasa - Islamic school education - with very significant numbers of students. Finally, functional literacy is very present with women as the main target.

== Health ==
The practice of female genital mutilation, the lack of a health staff as well as non-compliance with prenatal visits during pregnancy because of the lack of maternity care for deliveries pose a major risk to the mother and the newborn. This explains the high rate of maternal and child mortality seen in the town. Also malaria, the main reason for consultation, is rampant among pregnant women and children less than five years old. Finally it should be noted the increase in diarrheal diseases due to the inaccessibility of drinking water for the majority of the population. In recent years, EJA could barely finance the health nurse.

== Associative activity ==
The lack of support and advice structures and poor access to microcredit and factors of production are the main constraints on the Group for Advancement of Women (GPF) created in 1981. Despite these numerous constraints, Aly Oury has enormous potential, the most important being undoubtedly the willingness of youth to significantly improve the living conditions of the population. This desire came to fruition in 1978 with the creation of the League of Youth of Aly Oury (EJA) which was officially recognized in 1987. However, the League has not fully met expectations in terms of development, lack of committed partners and consequent lack of financial resources. However, it has participated in many cultural and sporting activities making Aly Oury a reference point in the "Daande Maayo" area.
