= Podor department =

Coordinates: 16°38′56″N 14°57′39″W

Podor
- Department
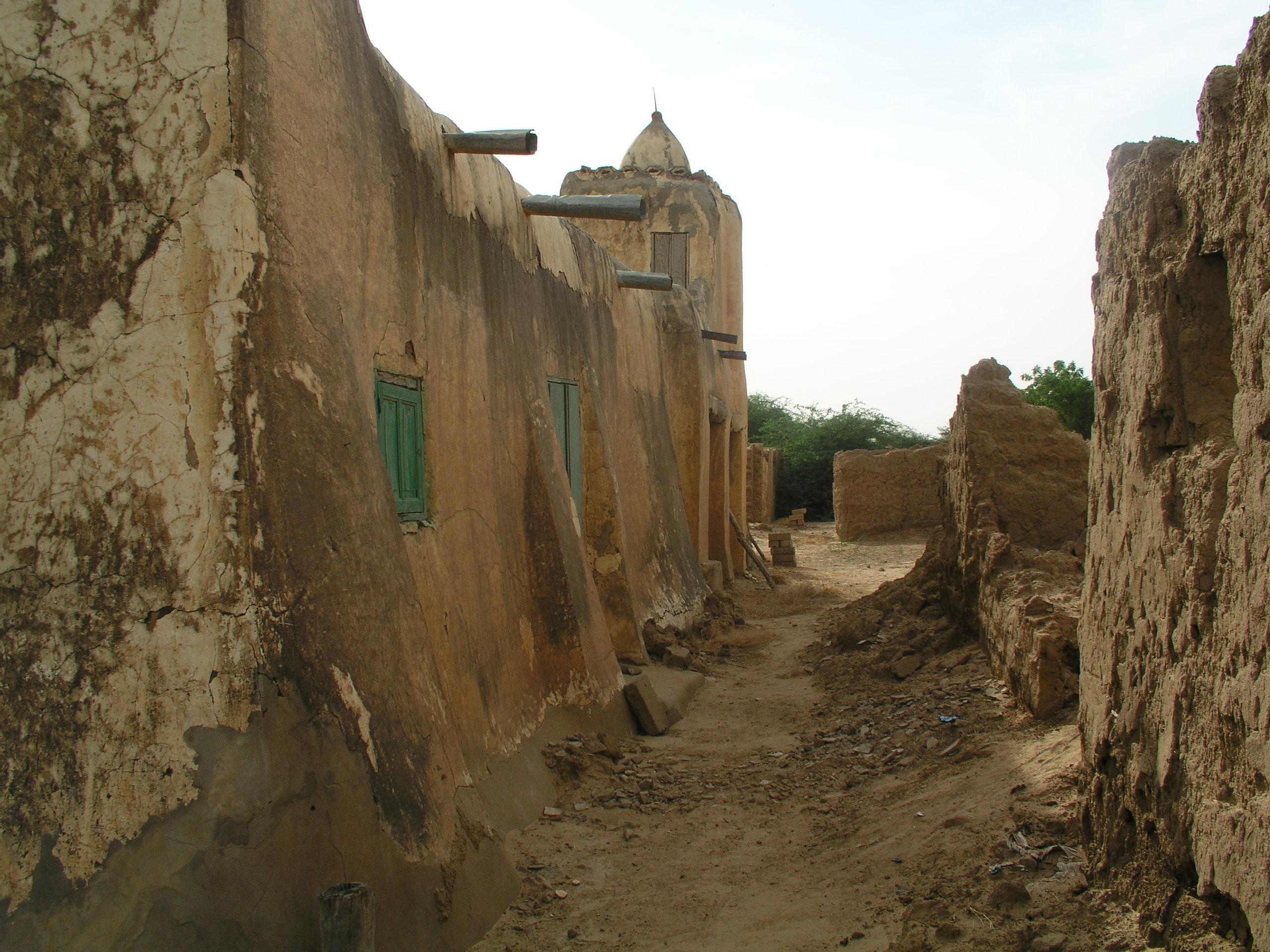
- Village street and mosque in Podor

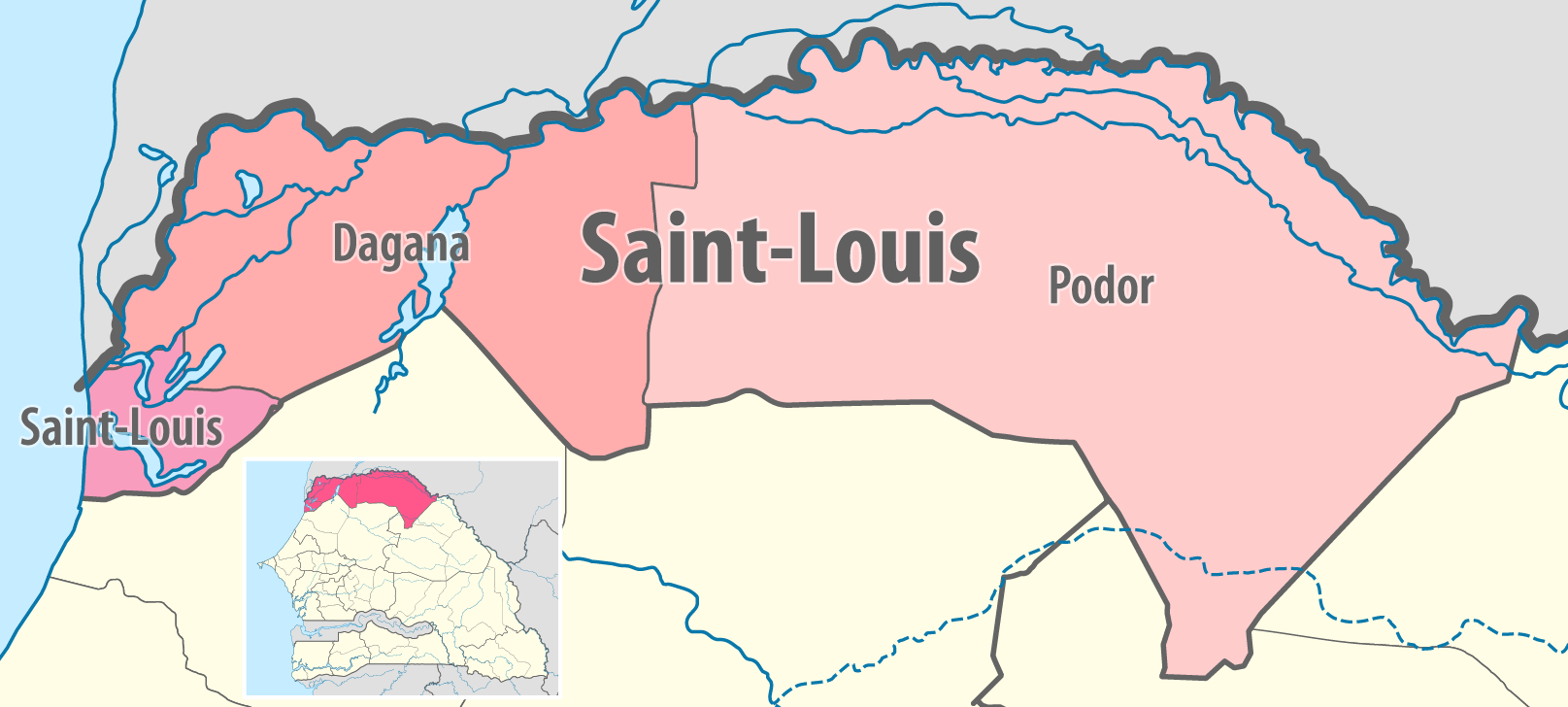
- Location in the Saint-Louis region
- Country: Senegal
- Region: Saint-Louis region
- Capital: Podor

Area
  - Total: 12,947 km^{2} (4,999 sq mi)

Population (2023 census)
  - Total: 487,220
  - Density: 37.632/km^{2} (97.466/sq mi)
- Time zone: UTC+0 (GMT)

Podor department is one of the 46 departments of Senegal and one of the three in the Saint-Louis region in the far north-west of the country.

Communes in the department are:

- Golléré
- Ndiandane
- Ndioum
- Podor
- Mboumba
- Guédé Chantier
- Démette
- Galoya Toucouleur
- Aéré Lao
- Pété
- Walaldé
- Bodé Lao

Rural districts (communautés rurales) comprise:

- Arrondissement of Cas-Cas
  - Méry
  - Doumga Lao
  - Madina Diathbé
- Arrondissement of Gamadji Saré
  - Gamadji Saré
  - Dodel
  - Guédé Village
- Arrondissement of Saldé
  - Mbolo Birane
  - Boké Dialloubé
- Arrondissement of Thillé Boubacar
  - Fanaye
  - Ndiayène Peindao

== Historic sites ==
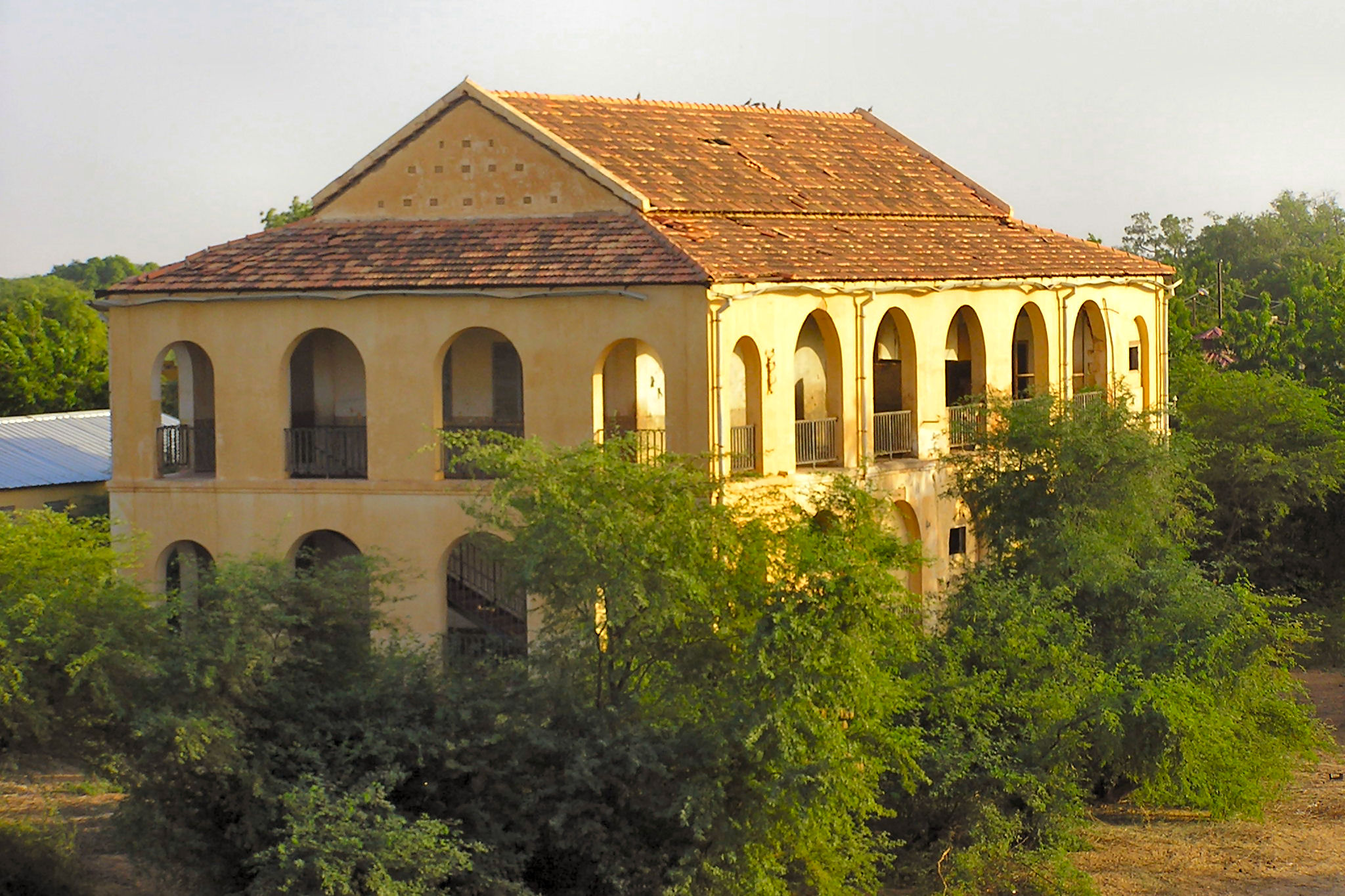
Podor Fort

- The Fort at Podor
- Maison Foy at the corner of the quay in Podor
- The quays and quay buildings of Podor
- The mosque at Alwar
- The Almamy cemetery at Mboumba
- The old mosque at Mboumba
- The mosque and mausoleum of Ouro Madiou
- The mosque of Diama Alwaly
- The old village of Walaldé
- The old village of Siouré
- The old village of Kaskas
- The mosque of Guédé Ouro
- The old village of Tioubalel
