= Balandine (Sénégal) =

Coordinates: 13°01′N 16°18′W

- Interactive map of Balandine
- Country: Senegal
- Time zone: UTC+0 (GMT)

Balandine is a settlement in Senegal located southeast of Djinoungué, and northwest of Thindieng on the Baila river in west Africa.
