= Koumpentoum =

- Town and commune
- Location in Senegal
- Coordinates: 13°59′N 14°34′W
- Country: Senegal
- Region: Tambacounda
- Department: Koumpentoum

Area
  - Town and commune: 7.393 km^{2} (2.854 sq mi)

Population (2023 census)
  - Town and commune: 15,723
  - Density: 2,127/km^{2} (5,508/sq mi)
- Time zone: UTC+0 (GMT)

Koumpentoum is a town and urban commune in the Tambacounda Region of central Senegal. In 2023 it had a population of 15,723 Koumpentoum was for centuries the capital of the Kingdom of Niani.

== Transport ==
It is served by a station on the national railway network.

== See also ==
- Railway stations in Senegal
