= Lol Lol Peul =

Coordinates: 15°07′N 15°16′W

- Village
- Lol Lol Peul
- Interactive map of Lol Lol Peul
- Country: Senegal
- Region: Louga
- Town: Louga

Lol Lol Peul is a Senegalese village located in the town of Louga, Louga Region.
