= Aïnoumal =

- Location in Senegal
- Coordinates: 13°58′N 15°8′W
- Country: Senegal
- Region: Kaolack Region

Aïnoumal is a small town in southern-central Senegal. It is located in the Kaolack Region.
