= Bapate =

Coordinates: 14.9778°N 16.8944°W

- Interactive map of Bapate
- Country: Senegal
- Time zone: UTC+0 (GMT)

Bapate is a settlement in Senegal.
