= Bakel, Senegal =

- Town and commune
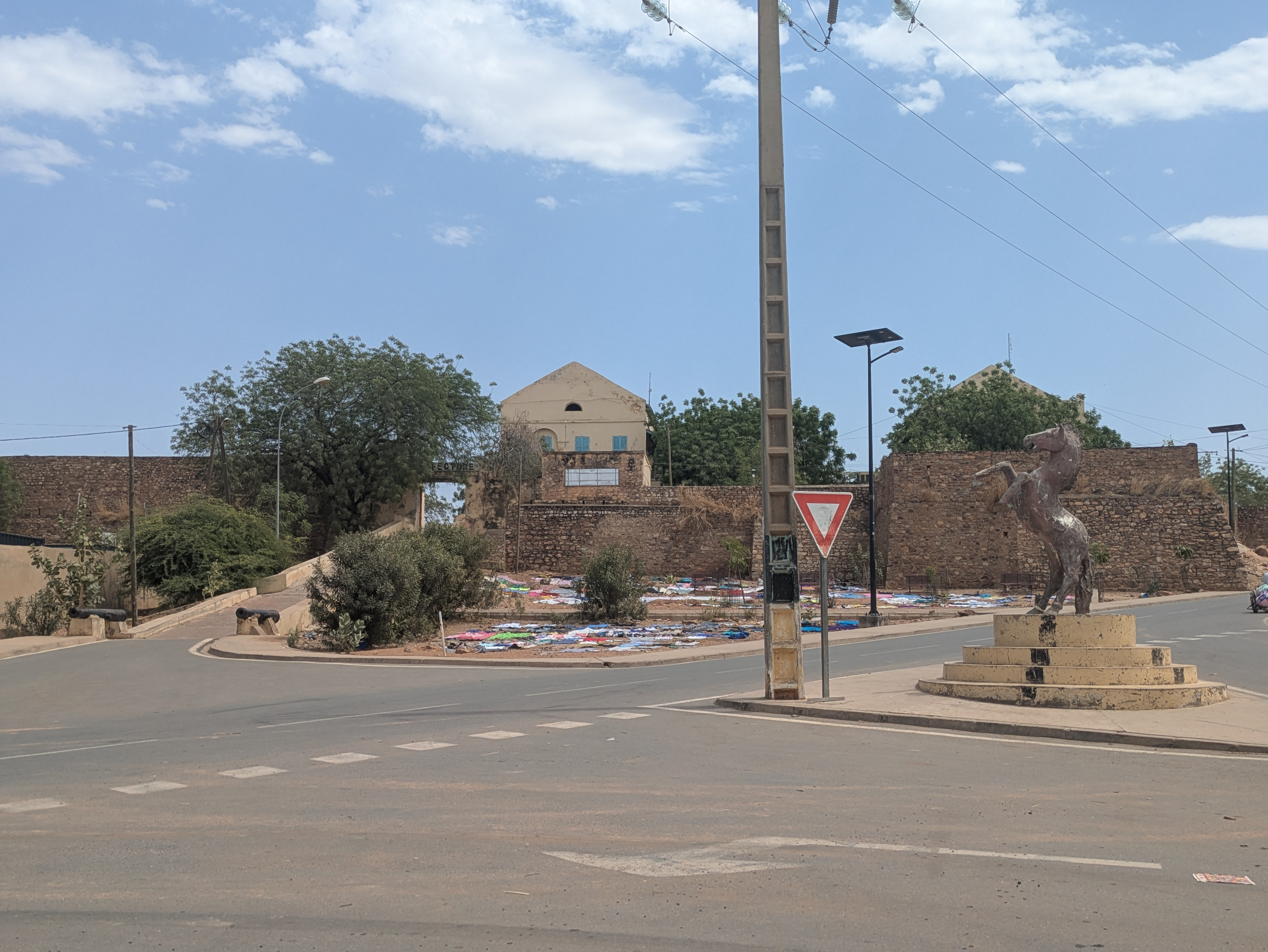
- The Prefecture of Bakel, Fort Faidherbe, and Place de l'Independance

- Location within Senegal
- Coordinates: 14°54′15″N 12°27′30″W
- Country: Senegal
- Region: Tambacounda
- Department: Bakel

Area
  - Town and commune: 5.858 km^{2} (2.262 sq mi)
- Elevation: 23 m (75 ft)

Population (2023 census)
  - Town and commune: 18,939
  - Density: 3,233/km^{2} (8,373/sq mi)
- Time zone: UTC+0 (GMT)

Bakel is a town and urban commune, with a population of 18,939, located in the eastern part of Senegal, West Africa. The town is located on the left bank of the Sénégal River, 65 kilometers (40 mi) from the Malian border and linked by canoe ferry to the village of Gouraye in Mauritania.

Bakel is one of the four eponymous departmental capitals in the region of Tambacounda, the other three being Tambacounda, Goudiry and Koumpentoum. Bakel is known for its French fort (Fort Bakel), which René Caillié visited in 1819. It was also the area where the Mauritanian crisis occurred, a dispute over grazing rights that led to a war between Senegal and Mauritania in 1989. As a result of this conflict, many people around the area moved abroad or emigrated to Senegal.

== People and culture ==
The majority of the population belong to the Soninke-speaking ethnic group, a dialect of the larger Mande Languages language family. There is also a substantial Pulaar (Fula) speaking minority as well as a significant amount of Bambara and Wolof (or Oulof) speakers, while most people learn some French in school. A large permanent market serves the department's inhabitants along with a weekly "Lumo" (similar to a flea market). Most inhabitants are subsistence farmers and herders, while the people in town are employed in informal businesses that range from carpentry, masonry and transportation of goods to selling fruit and produce on the street. Due to its location in the Sahel, the area is semi-arid with little vegetation outside of the rainy season. Various hills surround the town, which are known locally as "little mountains."

Bakel served as fodder for Bakel City Gang, a song by French rapper Booba whose father is from the town.

== History ==
The area that would become Bakel was first settled by a marabout named Abdoulaye Wane from Fouta Toro, along with his students, known as talibes.

At the beginning of the 17th century, members of the Ndiaye family fleeing succession disputes in the Jolof Empire moved to the area, then part of the Kingdom of Galam, also called Gajaaga, (see: Royaume de Galam), eventually integrating into the local Soninke population. Gajaaga and the neighboring Fula state of Bundu would compete for control over Bakel for the next century, as it was already an important trade depot.

The French began to penetrate the region in the 18th century, purchasing slaves from the Gajaaga monarchs to export from Saint Louis at the mouth of the river.

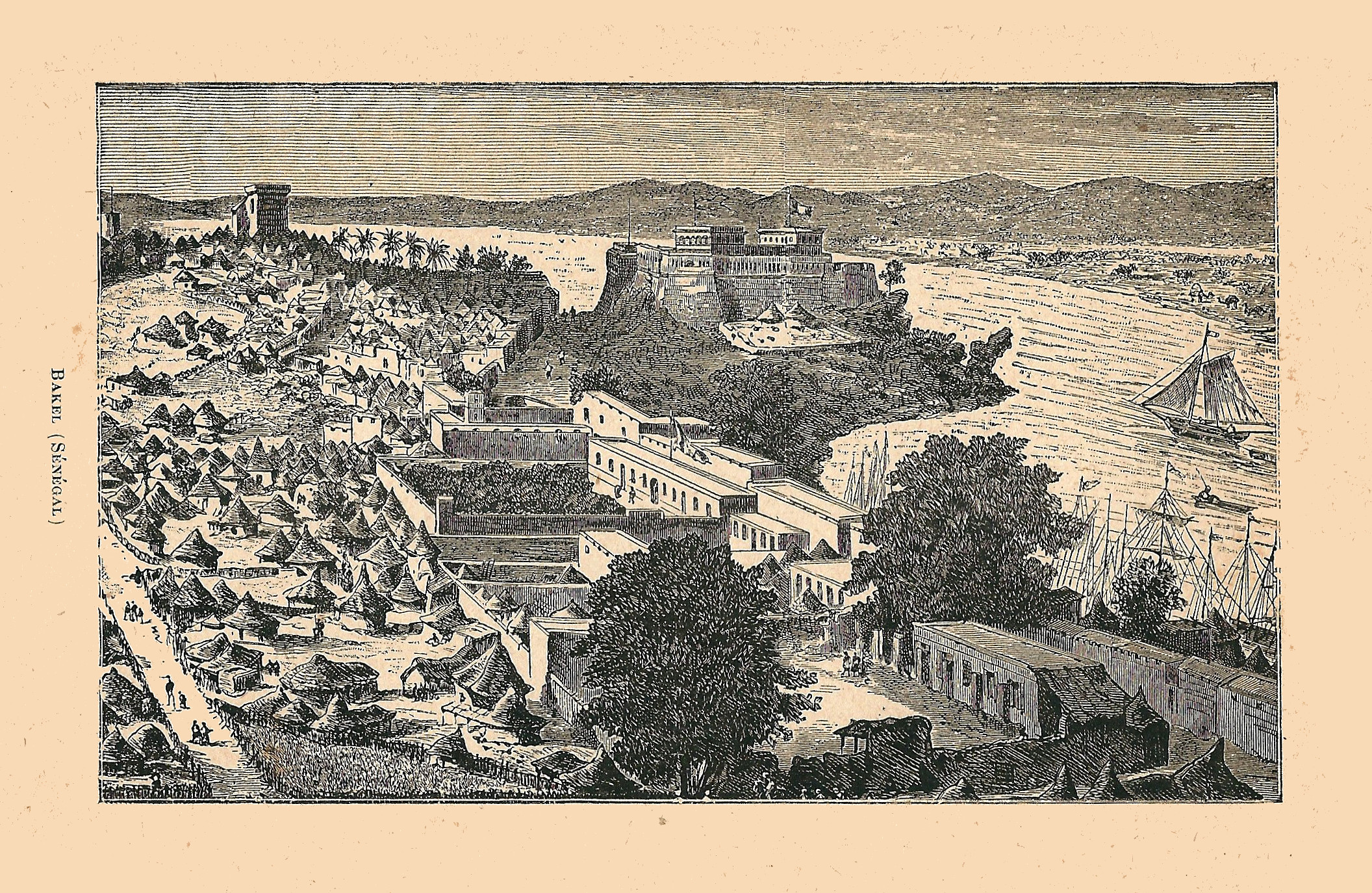
Bakel in 1892

In 1818, after the restoration of France's West Africa territories (which at the time consisted only in Saint-Louis and Gorée) in the 1815 Treaty of Paris, Auguste Jacques Nicolas Peureux de Mélay led a small flotilla up the Senegal. Blocked from going past Bakel by the seasonal drop in water level, they chose the spot to build a fort. The fort was established to counter growing British penetration of the West African market, attracting trade in gum arabic, gold, leather, and ivory. It also served to establish closer relations with the powerful, gold-rich Kingdom of Bundu further south. The fort became a base for promoting French influence, playing local leaders off of each other. Liberalization of trade after 1848 intensified the competition between native chiefs and groups vying for access to markets and imported goods.

In the 1850s, the Bakel garrison was strengthened as Omar Saidou Tall's jihad gained strength in the region and presented over-matched local tribes with a way to undermine French power. In 1855, the fort was officially annexed, following pressure from Saint Louisian merchants. In 1858, upper Gajaaga, between Bakel and the Faleme River, was annexed to the French colony.

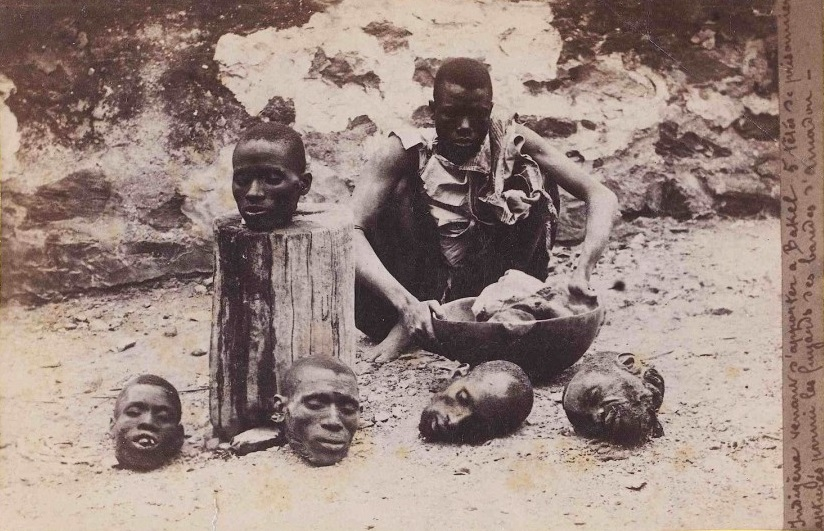
Heads of men executed in 1891

In 1886 the town was besieged briefly by the forces of Mahmadu Lamine. In 1891, in the aftermath of the fall of Nioro du Sahel to French forces, the colonial garrison of Bakel launched a massacre of former Toucouleur Empire soldiers, forcing many local inhabitants to participate.

Sénégal River at Bakel
(before construction of Manantali Dam)

Average monthly flow (m^{3}/s) at the Bakel hydrometric station over the period 1904-1984

Bakel is also the site of a study of annual flow volumes of the Senegal River from 1904 to 1990 which showed a dramatic reduction in the river's volume especially in the past twenty years.

== Climate ==
Bakel has a hot semi-arid climate (BSh) according to the Köppen climate classification.

Climate data for Bakel (1991–2020)
Month	Jan	Feb	Mar	Apr	May	Jun	Jul	Aug	Sep	Oct	Nov	Dec	Year
Mean daily maximum °C (°F)	34.1 (93.4)	37.0 (98.6)	40.4 (104.7)	43.0 (109.4)	43.4 (110.1)	40.7 (105.3)	36.1 (97.0)	34.3 (93.7)	34.8 (94.6)	38.2 (100.8)	38.2 (100.8)	35.0 (95.0)	37.9 (100.2)
Mean daily minimum °C (°F)	17.9 (64.2)	20.0 (68.0)	22.5 (72.5)	25.4 (77.7)	28.0 (82.4)	27.3 (81.1)	24.7 (76.5)	23.8 (74.8)	23.2 (73.8)	23.5 (74.3)	20.2 (68.4)	18.5 (65.3)	22.9 (73.2)
Record low °C (°F)	7.6 (45.7)	9.1 (48.4)	13.0 (55.4)	15.8 (60.4)	17.6 (63.7)	15.0 (59.0)	14.6 (58.3)	15.6 (60.1)	14.4 (57.9)	13.9 (57.0)	10.0 (50.0)	9.5 (49.1)	7.6 (45.7)
Average precipitation mm (inches)	0.7 (0.03)	1.0 (0.04)	0.7 (0.03)	0.1 (0.00)	6.9 (0.27)	51.1 (2.01)	137.9 (5.43)	199.0 (7.83)	153.6 (6.05)	34.9 (1.37)	0.7 (0.03)	0.0 (0.0)	586.6 (23.09)
Average precipitation days (≥ 1.0 mm)	0.2	0.0	0.1	0.1	1.1	4.3	8.6	11.0	9.4	2.7	0.1	0.0	37.6
Source: NOAA

== Gallery ==
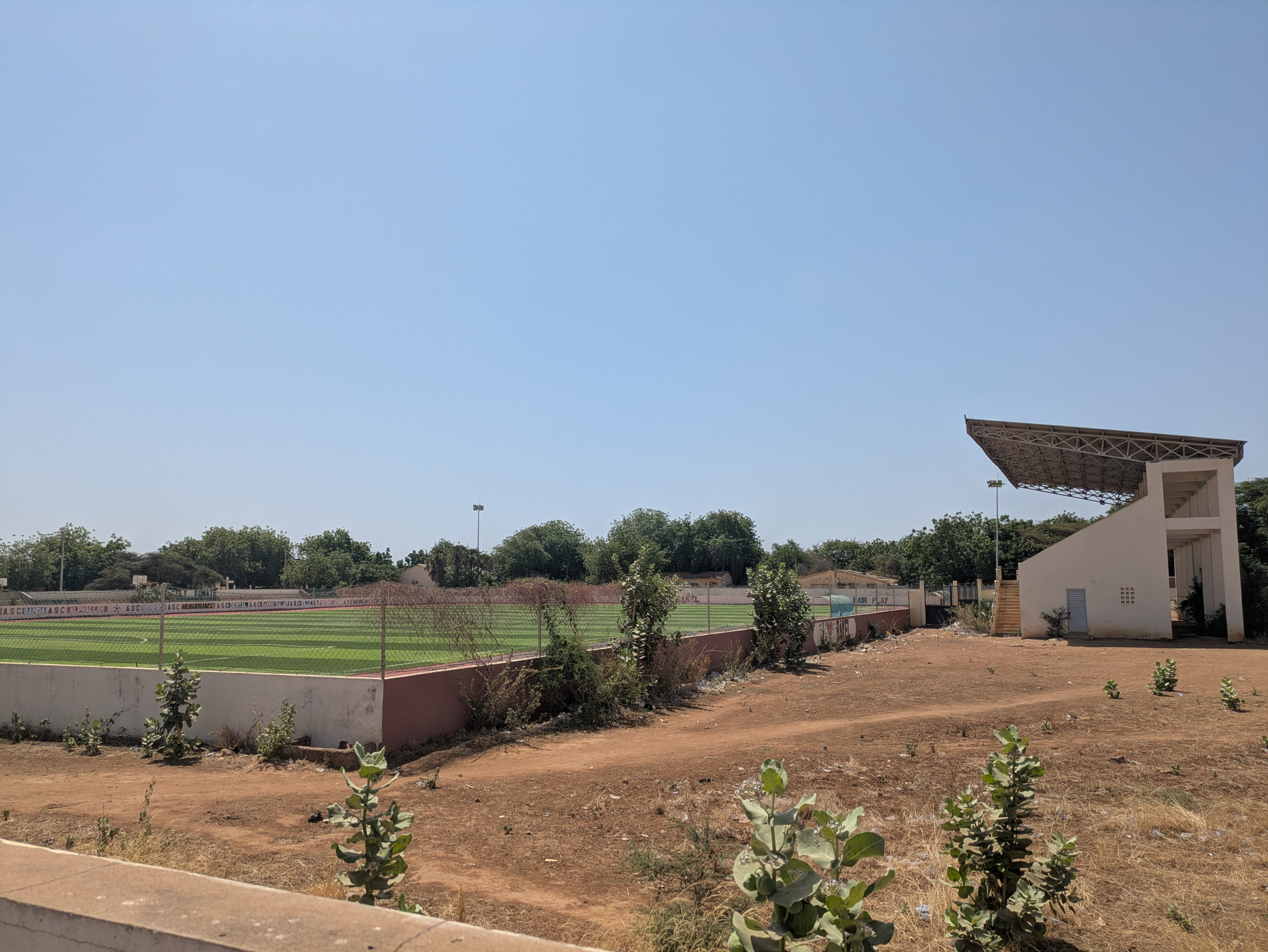
The municipal stadium

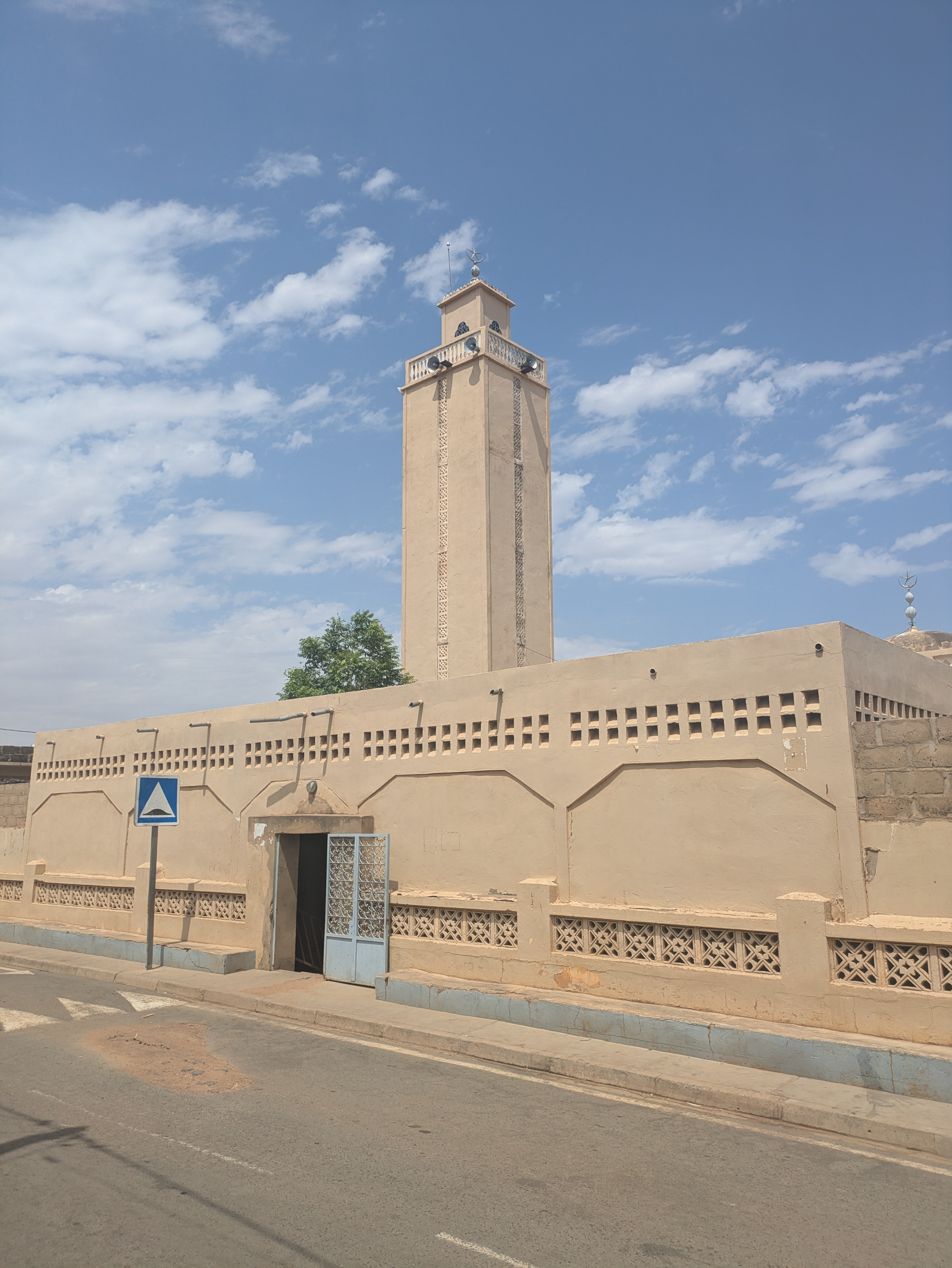
The Great Mosque

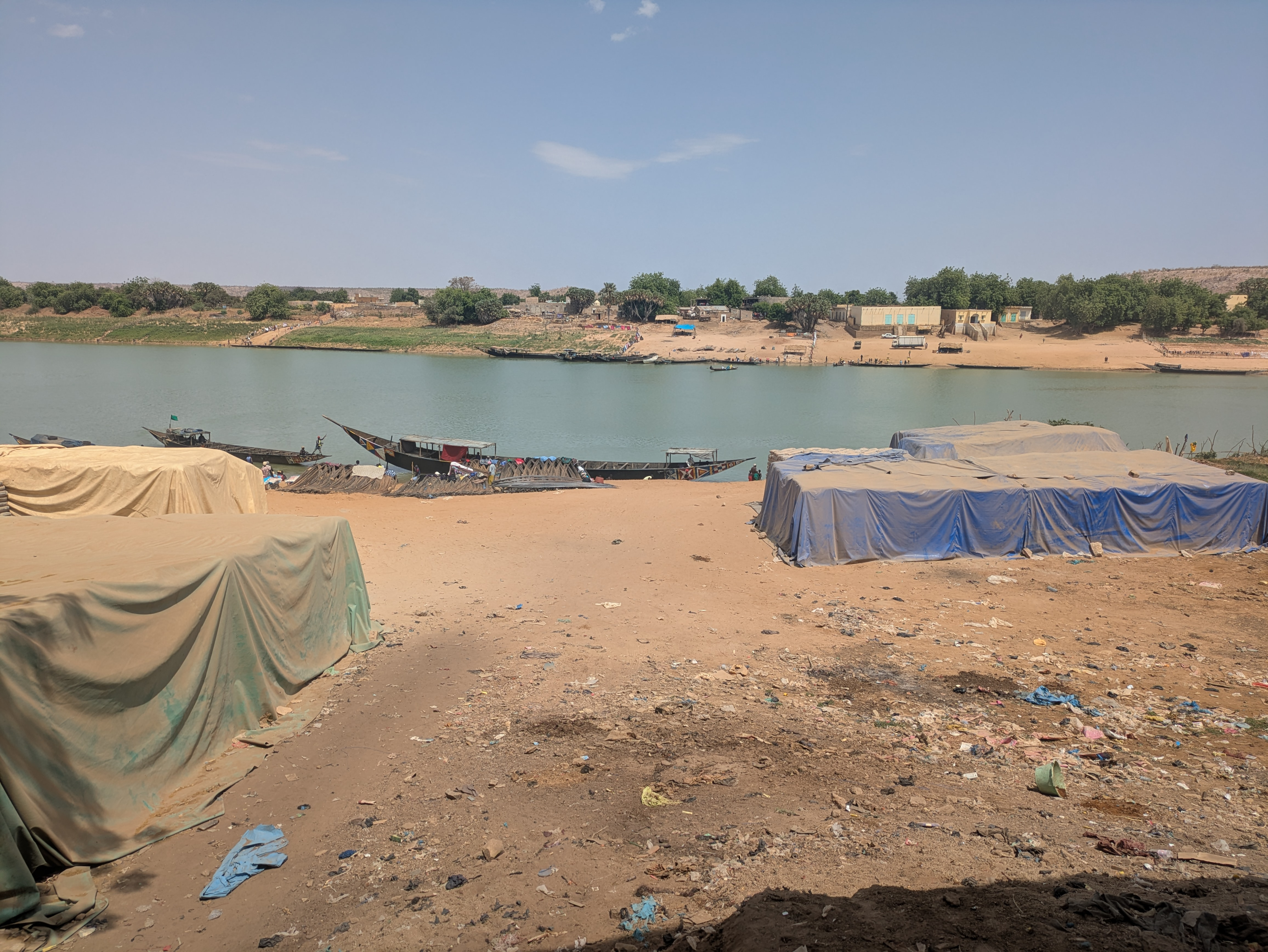
The Senegal River waterfront

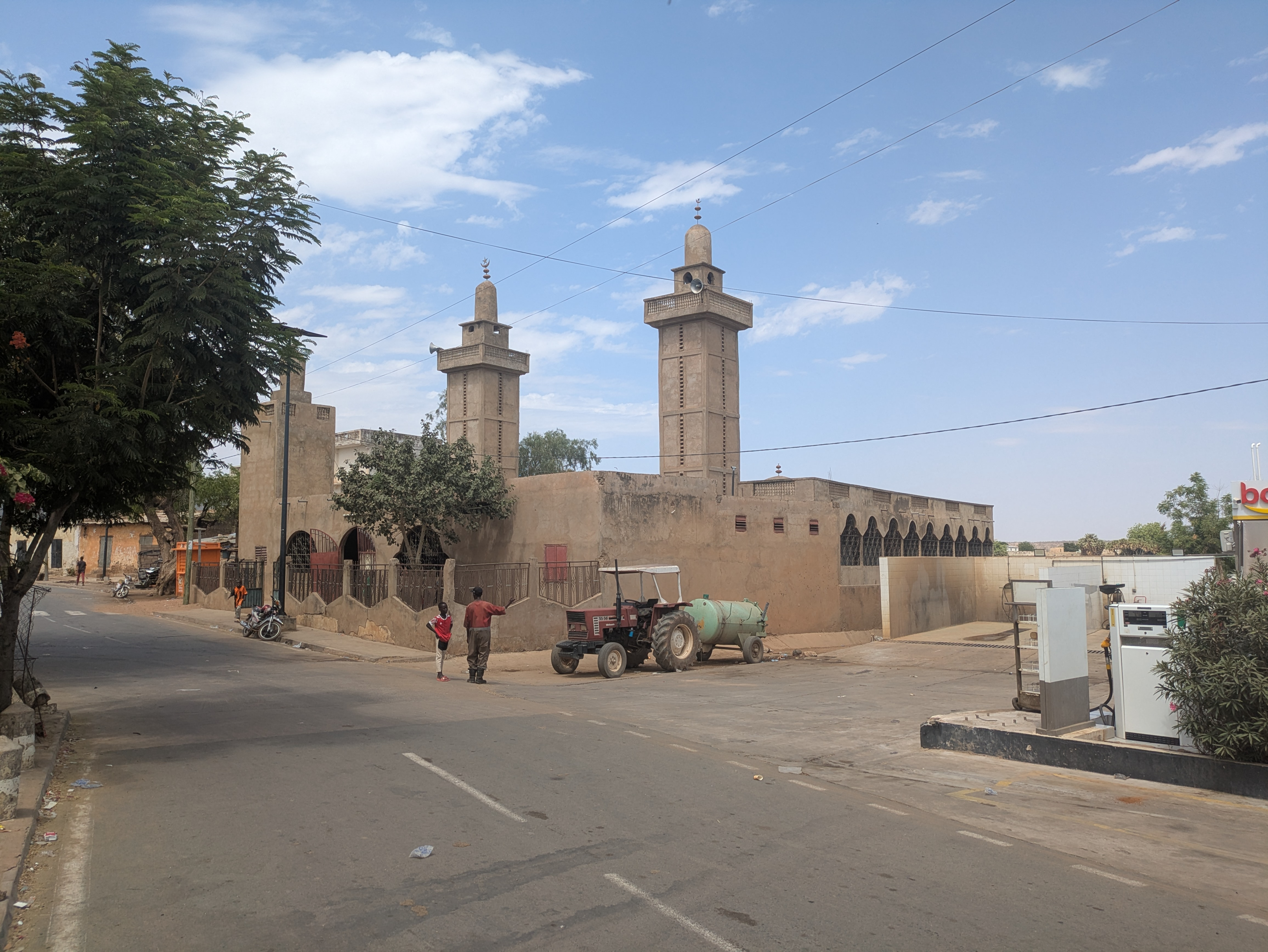
The Ndiayga Mosque, the oldest mosque in Bakel

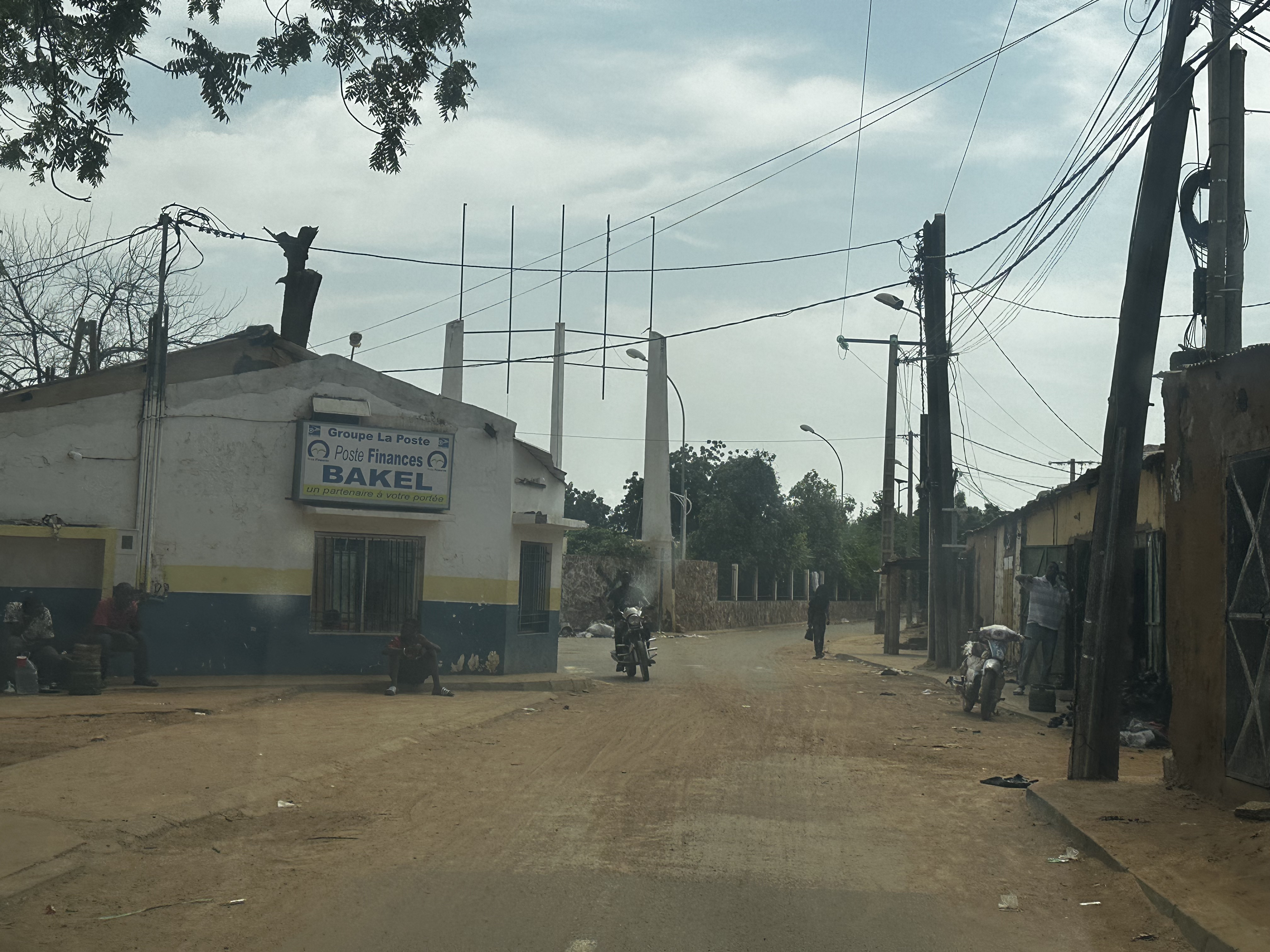
Street scene in Bakel
