= Barkédji =

Coordinates: 15°16′41.9″N 14°52′0.2″W

- Interactive map of Barkédji
- Country: Senegal
- Time zone: UTC+0 (GMT)

Barkédji is a settlement in Senegal.
