= Ali Gane =

- Location in Senegal
- Coordinates: 14°4′N 15°37′W
- Country: Senegal
- Region: Kaolack Region

Ali Gane is a small town in western-central Senegal. It is located in the Kaolack Region.

Nearby towns and villages include Gama (2.2 nm), Moukhoume (2.2 nm), Ndiayene Bagana (1.0 nm), Guissam (1.4 nm), Kebe Keur Babou (1.4 nm), Medina Diognik (1.4 nm) and Loumene (1.4 nm).
