= Boukitingho =

- Country: Senegal
- Time zone: UTC+0 (GMT)

Boukitingho is a settlement in Senegal.
