= Pout, Senegal =

Pout
- Town and commune
- Location in Senegal
- Coordinates: 14°46′26″N 17°3′37″W
- Country: Senegal
- Region: Thiès Region
- Department: Thiès Department

Area
  - Town and commune: 7.109 km^{2} (2.745 sq mi)

Population (2023 census)
  - Town and commune: 29,874
  - Density: 4,202/km^{2} (10,880/sq mi)
- Time zone: UTC+0 (GMT)

Pout is a town with commune status in Thiès Department in Thiès Region of Senegal. Its population in 2023 was 29,874. It stands on the side of the N2 road, giving easy access to the large towns of Dakar and Saint-Louis.

The town, in an area traditionally peopled by Sereer, has developed rapidly as a result of industrialisation. It was made a commune de ville in 1990.

Surrounded by forest, it is also a vegetable and fruit growing area where mangos, mandarins and oranges are produced. The industrial activity includes agricultural machine fabrication, salt and cement production and the export offruit and vegetables.
