= Ndioum =

- Town and commune
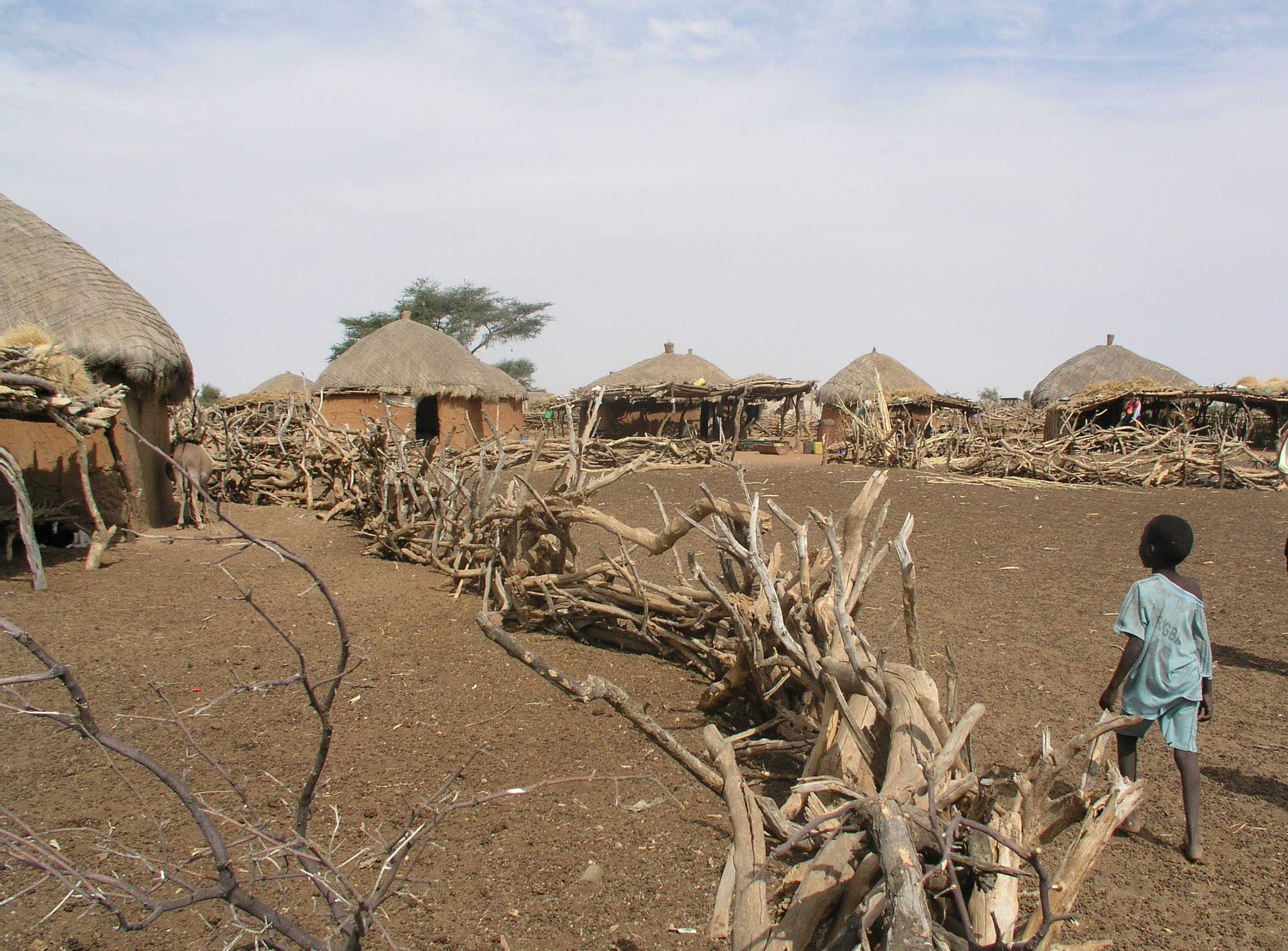

- Location in Senegal
- Coordinates: 16°31′N 14°39′W
- Country: Senegal
- Region: Saint-Louis Region
- Department: Podor Department

Area
  - Town and commune: 5.283 km^{2} (2.040 sq mi)

Population (2023 census)
  - Town and commune: 20,270
  - Density: 3,837/km^{2} (9,937/sq mi)
- Time zone: UTC+0 (GMT)

Ndioum is a town and urban commune in the Saint-Louis Region of Senegal. It is located in the Podor Department. The population in 2023 was 20,270, an increase from the 14,341 counted in 2013.

The town received commune status in 1990. It is located on the national road N2.
