= Gama, Senegal =

Gama
- Location in Senegal
- Coordinates: 14°5′N 15°39′W
- Country: Senegal
- Region: Kaolack Region

Gama is a small town in western-central Senegal. It is located in the Kaolack Region.

Nearby towns and villages include Gordilene (1.0 nm), Ali Gane (2.2 nm), Keur Deuri (2.2 nm), Keur Tierno Tala (2.2 nm), Ndiayene Bagana (1.9 nm), Kebe Lanim(2.2 nm), Dimbe Korki (1.4 nm), Keur Modou (1.4 nm), Nianguene (2.0 nm), Medina Diognik (2.2 nm).
