= Kayar, Senegal =

Coastal city in Senegal

Kayar
- City
- Location within Senegal
- Coordinates: 14.91967°N 17.11942°W
- Country: Senegal
- Region: Thiès Region
- Department: Thiès Department

Population (2023 census)
  - Total: 33,273

Kayar is one of the coastal cities of Senegal. Located in the Thiès region, it is located 36 miles north of Dakar, the capital city of Senegal.

== Population ==
Year	Population
1976	3,574
1988	7,307
2002	16,252
2013	23,585
2023	33,273

According to the 2023 census, the population of Kayar numbers around 33,273. From 2002 to 2013, the city experienced a 3.46% growth per annum, and from 2013 to 2023 a 3.59% growth per annum.

== Local economy ==
The economy of Kayar depends on the Atlantic Ocean as it's one of the major fishing centers in Senegal. Kayar has the third largest fishing center in the country, but it is the most systemized in terms of self-regulation. There are associations for the long-liners, purse seiners, and traders that organize the fishing industry and ensure that the needs of each group are met without exploiting other groups. Purse seiners are allowed one fishing session per day. The rest of the fishermen have a daily maximum of about 100lbs (45 kg). If they exceed the limit, they are taxed, and the money goes toward replacing broken pirogues or assisting the less fortunate fishermen and their families.

Though self-regulation is exceedingly important, the bulk of the fish in the coastal waters have been fished by illegal vessels. Much more effort and danger are required to yield less and less profit. Without the ability to support the community exclusively through fishing, the illegal fishing trade has increased the need for the development of farming in the area and has also increased the amount of illegal migration to Europe.

== Migration ==
In 2006 Kayar was one of the main departure points for West Africans trying to reach the Canary Islands of Spain, on the very fishing vessels that have sustained those living in Kayar for decades. The number of migrants in 2006 alone reached 30,000. Of those 30,000 people, over 6,000 died. Through sea and air patrols, the number of migrants ceased to the point where the route from Kayar to the Canary Islands is now defunct.

== More information ==
A documentary by French filmmaker Thomas Grand called Kayar, A Childhood Caught in the Nets (Kayar, L'Enfance Prise aux Filets) follows the story of a young man named Adama. The film is in Wolof with French subtitles and explores life in Kayar.
