= Meckhe =

- Town and commune
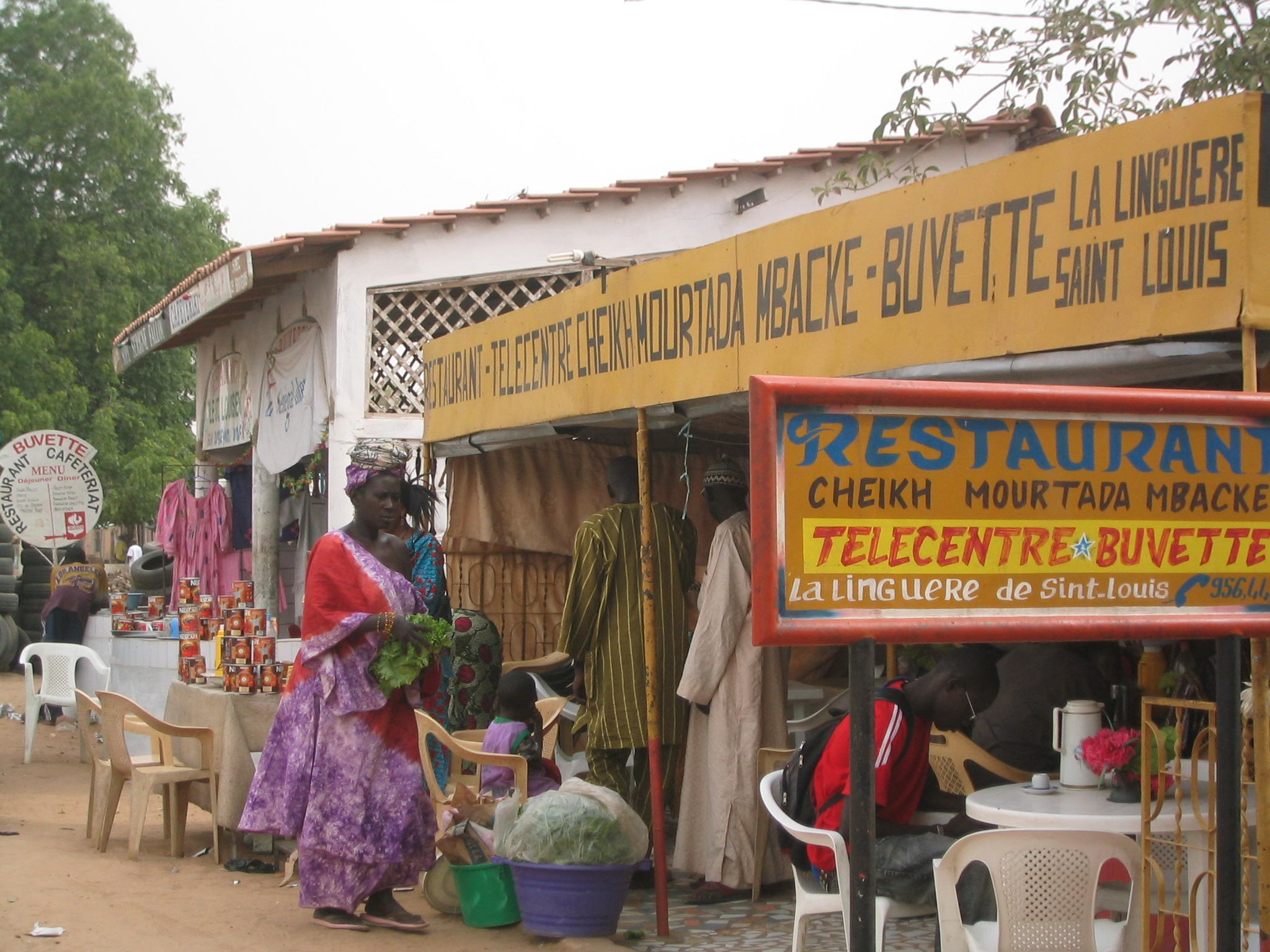

- Location within Senegal
- Coordinates: 15°07′N 16°38′W
- Country: Senegal
- Region: Thiès Region
- Department: Tivaouane

Area
  - Town and commune: 6.342 km^{2} (2.449 sq mi)

Population (2023 census)
  - Town and commune: 27,566
  - Density: 4,347/km^{2} (11,260/sq mi)
- Time zone: UTC+0 (GMT)

Meckhe is a town and urban commune in Senegal, which is located in the north-west of the country, between Dakar and Saint-Louis. It lies in the department of Tivaouane within the region of Thiès. It had a population of 27,566 in 2023.

Economical activity is centered on agriculture, handicrafts, commerce and cattle breeding.

It is a sister city with Saint-Dié-des-Vosges, France.

== History ==
In 1868 Lat Jor and his ally Shaikh Amadou Ba defeated the French in the battle of Mekhe on July 8th, 1869.
