= Bambey =

- Town and commune
- Location in Senegal
- Coordinates: 14.69299°N 16.45209°W
- Country: Senegal
- Region: Diourbel Region
- Department: Bambey

Area
  - Town and commune: 10.27 km^{2} (3.97 sq mi)

Population (2023 census)
  - Town and commune: 37,374
  - Density: 3,639/km^{2} (9,425/sq mi)
- Time zone: UTC+0 (GMT)

Bambey is a town and urban commune located in the Diourbel Region of Senegal. It will host the Petanque events at the 2026 Summer Youth Olympics.

== Transport ==
The town lies on the N3 road connecting it to Dakar and is also served by a mainline station on the Dakar-Niger Railway.

== Climate ==
Climate data for Bambey (1991–2020)
Month	Jan	Feb	Mar	Apr	May	Jun	Jul	Aug	Sep	Oct	Nov	Dec	Year
Mean daily maximum °C (°F)	33.5 (92.3)	35.3 (95.5)	37.4 (99.3)	38.2 (100.8)	38.2 (100.8)	37.0 (98.6)	34.6 (94.3)	33.2 (91.8)	33.5 (92.3)	36.2 (97.2)	36.8 (98.2)	34.4 (93.9)	35.7 (96.3)
Mean daily minimum °C (°F)	16.8 (62.2)	18.1 (64.6)	18.9 (66.0)	19.6 (67.3)	21.1 (70.0)	23.4 (74.1)	24.3 (75.7)	24.2 (75.6)	23.9 (75.0)	23.2 (73.8)	19.8 (67.6)	17.9 (64.2)	20.9 (69.6)
Average precipitation mm (inches)	0.0 (0.0)	0.8 (0.03)	0.2 (0.01)	0.0 (0.0)	0.2 (0.01)	21.3 (0.84)	107.5 (4.23)	208.9 (8.22)	156.6 (6.17)	27.3 (1.07)	0.5 (0.02)	0.1 (0.00)	523.4 (20.61)
Average precipitation days (≥ 1.0 mm)	0.0	0.1	0.1	0.0	0.1	1.4	6.5	12.0	10.2	2.9	0.1	0.1	33.5
Source: NOAA
