= Khombole =

- Town and commune
- Location within Senegal
- Coordinates: 14°46′N 16°41′W
- Country: Senegal
- Region: Thiès Region
- Department: Thiès Department

Area
  - Town and commune: 6.467 km^{2} (2.497 sq mi)

Population (2023 census)
  - Town and commune: 20,321
  - Density: 3,142/km^{2} (8,138/sq mi)
- Time zone: UTC+0 (GMT)

Khombole is a town and urban commune in the Thiès Region of Senegal. It is located in the Thiès Department. The population in 2023 was 20,321, an increase from the 15,598 counted in 2013.

Pape Mandialbere Mboup was elected mayor in 2014.

== Notable residents ==
- Ousmane Socé Diop, veterinarian and politician
- Seydou Nourou Ba, ambassador
- Ousmane Mbaye, politician
