= Gossas =

- Town and commune
- Location within Senegal
- Coordinates: 14°30′N 16°04′W
- Country: Senegal
- Region: Fatick Region
- Department: Gossas

Area
  - Town and commune: 5.601 km^{2} (2.163 sq mi)
- Elevation: 21 m (69 ft)

Population (2023 census)
  - Town and commune: 15,630
  - Density: 2,791/km^{2} (7,228/sq mi)
- Time zone: UTC+0 (GMT)

Gossas is a town and urban commune in Fatick Region in western Senegal, about 90 km from the capital Dakar.

== Transport ==
The town is served by a station on the Dakar-Niger Railway.

== See also ==
- Transport in Senegal
- Railway stations in Senegal
