= Thiadiaye =

- Town and commune
- Location within Senegal
- Coordinates: 14°25′N 16°42′W
- Country: Senegal
- Region: Thiès Region
- Department: M'bour Department

Area
  - Town and commune: 6.162 km^{2} (2.379 sq mi)

Population (2023 census)
  - Town and commune: 20,168
  - Density: 3,273/km^{2} (8,477/sq mi)
- Time zone: UTC+0 (GMT)

Thiadiaye is a town and urban commune in the Thiès Region of western Senegal. It is located in the M'bour Department. The population in 2023 was 20,168, an increase from the 14,975 counted in 2013.

The town received commune status in 1996. It is located on the national route N1, between M'bour and Fatick.
