= Nguékhokh =

- Town and commune
- Location within Senegal
- Coordinates: 14°30′46″N 17°03′00″W
- Country: Senegal
- Region: Thiès Region
- Department: M'bour Department

Area
  - Town and commune: 12.23 km^{2} (4.72 sq mi)

Population (2023 census)
  - Town and commune: 47,964
  - Density: 3,922/km^{2} (10,160/sq mi)
- Time zone: UTC+0 (GMT)

Nguékhokh is a town and urban commune in the Thiès Region of western Senegal. It is located in the M'bour Department. The population in 2023 was 47,964 an increase from the 27,033 counted in 2013.

The town received commune status in 1996. It is situated on the national route N1, between M'bour and Rufisque. A wine production facility opened here in 2015, sparking some controversy.
