= Bembou =

Coordinates: 12°49′N 11°53′W

- Interactive map of Bembou
- Country: Senegal
- Time zone: UTC+0 (GMT)

Bembou is a settlement in Senegal.
