= Ogo (arrondissement) =

- Arrondissement
- Location within Senegal
- Country: Senegal

Ogo is an arrondissement of Matam in Matam Region in Senegal.
