= Ogo, Diourbel =

Village in Diourbel Region, Senegal

Coordinates: 14°35′N 15°50′W

Ogo is a village in Diourbel Region, Senegal.
