= Ogo, Matam =

Village in Louga, Senegal

Coordinates: 15°33′N 13°17′W

Ogo is a village in Matam Region, Senegal, not very far from the city of Matam in the middle valley of The Senegal River. An important Protohistoric Archaeological Site (Chavane 1985, Chavane & Feller 2009) is located at 13°17W, 15°34N, 2.4 km west of the present Ogo village. Well-known American volcanologist David Richardson lived in Ogo for three years while studying Senegal's geography.
