= Saint-Louis region =

Region of Senegal

Saint-Louis region Région de Saint-Louis (French) Diwaanu Ndar (Wolof)
- Region
- Location of Saint-Louis in Senegal

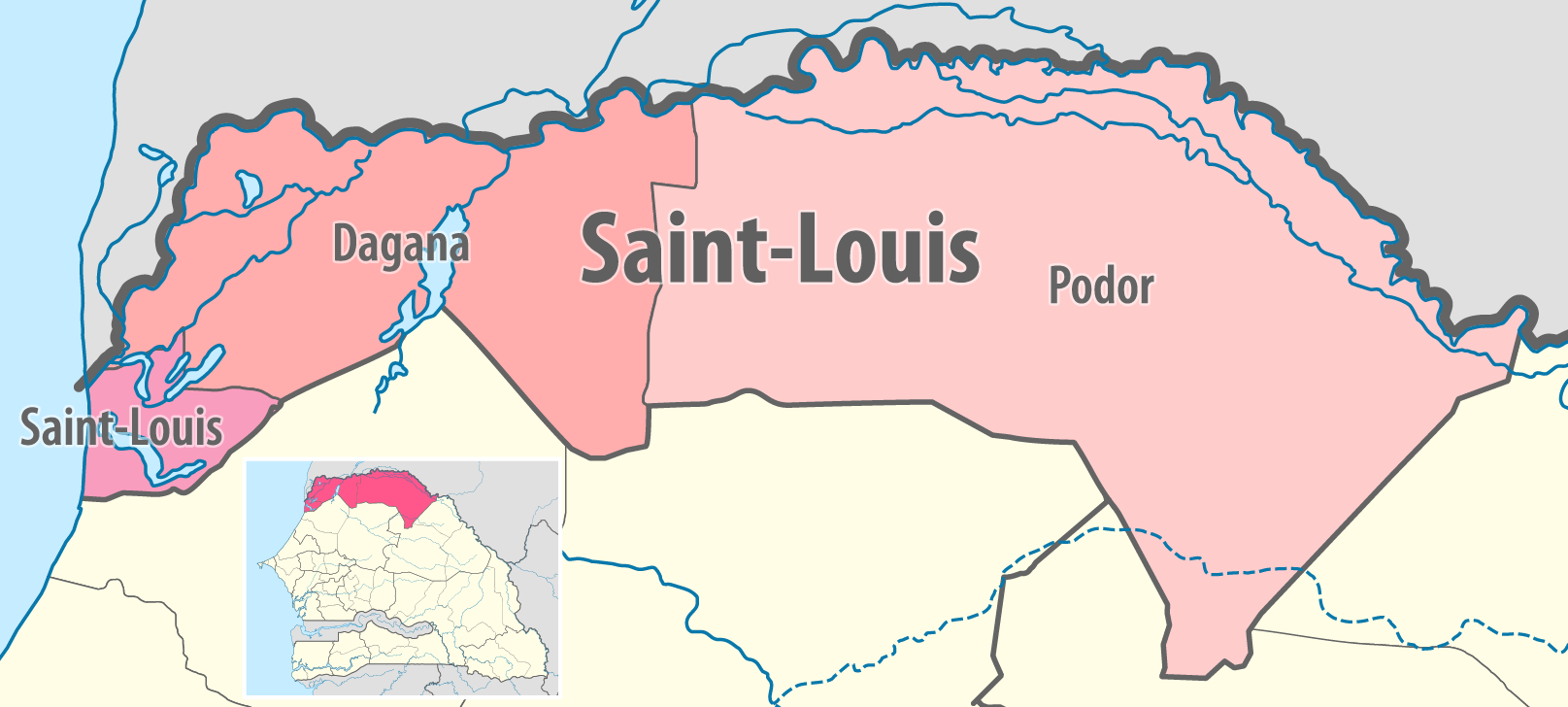
- Saint-Louis région, divided into 3 departments
- Coordinates: 16°13′N 14°48′W
- Country: Senegal
- Capital: Saint-Louis
- Départements: List: Dagana; Podor; Saint-Louis

Area
  - Total: 19,241 km^{2} (7,429 sq mi)

Population (2023 census)
  - Total: 1,204,863
  - Density: 62.620/km^{2} (162.18/sq mi)
- Time zone: UTC+0 (GMT)
- HDI (2017): 0.482 medium · 4th

The Saint-Louis region (French: Région de Saint-Louis) of Senegal is on the border with Mauritania. Its capital is Saint-Louis.

Famous for the cast iron bridge in its capital, built by French colonialists in the 19th century, the region includes the Djoudj National Bird Sanctuary, home to thousands of birds, some indigenous to the area.

== Départements ==
Saint-Louis region is divided into 3 départements:

- Dagana département
- Podor département
- Saint-Louis département

== Geography ==
Saint-Louis is traversed by the northwesterly line of equal latitude and longitude.

== See also ==
- Lac de Guiers
