= Tambacounda region =

Region of Senegal

Tambacounda region Région de Tambacounda (French) Diiwaanu Tambaakundaa (Wolof)
- Region
- Location of Tambacounda in Senegal

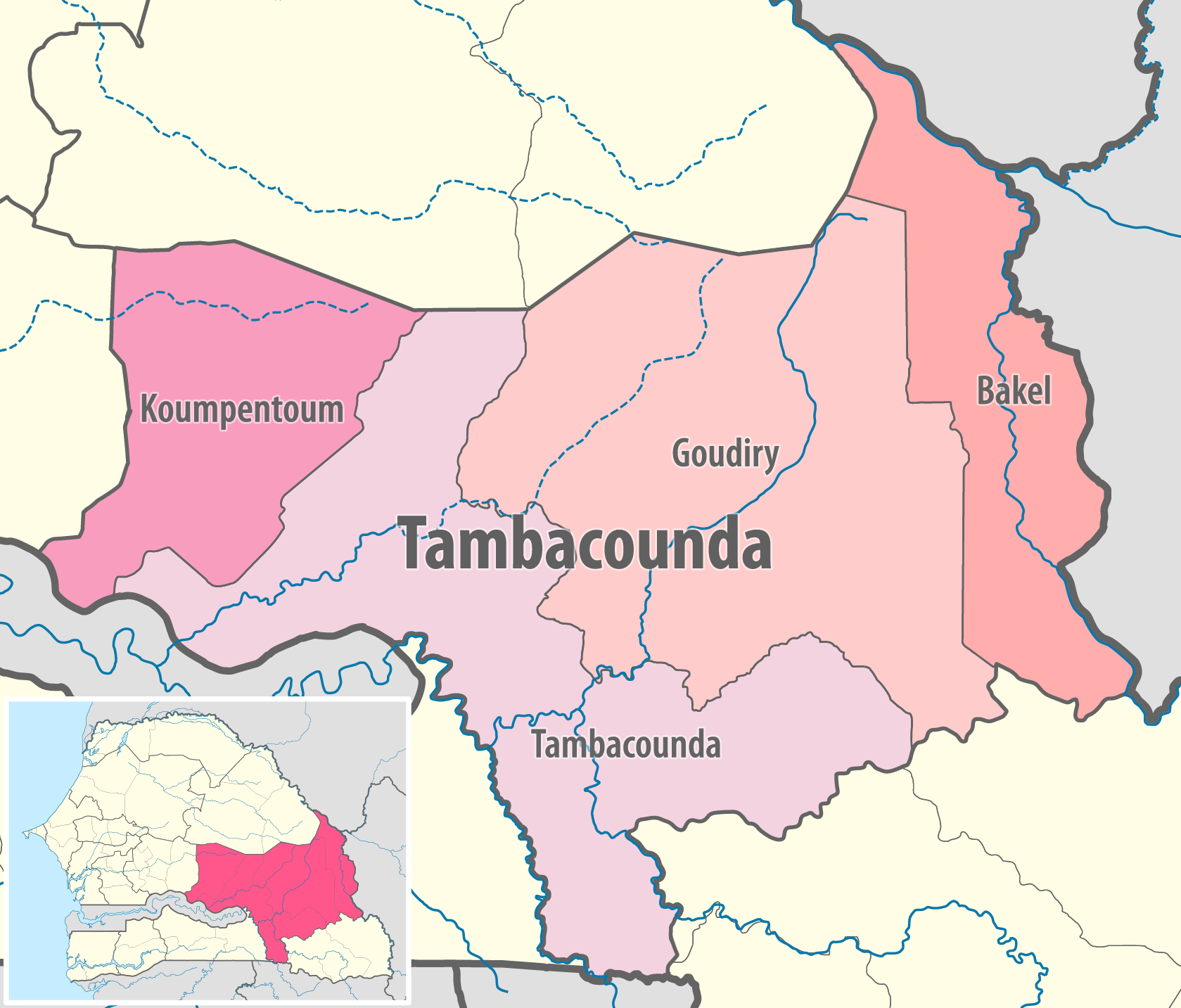
- Tambacounda région, divided into 4 départements
- Coordinates: 13°18′N 12°49′W
- Country: Senegal
- Capital: Tambacounda
- Départements: List: Bakel; Goudiry; Koumpentoum; Tambacounda

Area
  - Total: 42,364 km^{2} (16,357 sq mi)

Population (2023 census)
  - Total: 988,193
  - Density: 23.326/km^{2} (60.415/sq mi)
- Time zone: UTC+0 (GMT)

Tambacounda, formerly known as Sénégal Oriental, is a region of Senegal. It used to be part of the Mali Empire before the borders were created to separate Mali from Senegal. Tambacounda is physically the largest of Senegal's 14 regions, but is sparsely populated and its economy lags behind the rest of the country. The department of Kédougou was separated from Tambacounda in 2008, and became a separate region.

== Departments ==
Tambacounda region is divided into 4 departments:

- Bakel département
- Goudiry département
- Koumpentoum département
- Tambacounda département

== Geography ==
Tambacounda is traversed by the northwesterly line of equal latitude and longitude.

== Culture ==
Tambacounda is famous for its rich djembe and dance culture and heritage. Some of the greatest djembe masters from Segu, Mali came to Tambacounda in the mid 1900s, bringing with them their history, knowledge, and secrets of the djembe. Its official language is French, but Wolof is more widely spoken in Sénégal.

Much knowledge of djembe history was transmitted directly to djembe master Abdoulaye Diakité by his master teacher Suncaru Jara. Jara's teacher was Chebleni Traore whose teacher, Numuni Traore, was the first djembe master to bring the djembe out of Bamana secrecy, igniting its diaspora.

The diaspora of the djembe also occurred because there were too many djembe masters in Tambacounda at that time, pressuring some to move on to different towns or countries. Diakité significantly influenced the djembe's diaspora, first by touring worldwide with the National Ballet of Senegal for 18 years as their lead soloist, in addition to his later work in the 1990s running the Tambacounda West African Drum and Dance Camp in the Bay Area.

In light of its rich cultural heritage and location, Tambacounda is today known as a djembe "proving ground", since one never knows who might be passing through. This has kept the local djembe players on their toes, by playing according to tradition. Even in the face of globalization, djembe performances have remained predominantly traditional in Tambacounda.

In 2019, Italian artist Giovanni Hänninen launched a project called People of Tamba, consisting of 200 portraits taken across the Tambacounda region in Senegal exhibited at Also Known as Africa (AKAA) art and design fair, 8-11 November 2019. Inspired by German photographer August Sander's seminal work, People of the 20th Century, People of Tamba was conceived as dignified portrait of the society of Tambacounda, the largest city in the most remote and rural region of Senegal, and the point of departure for the majority of Senegalese migration, with the aim to counter negative and number-based reporting about migration in western media by bringing individuals and their personal stories to the fore.

== Notable people ==
- Moutarou Baldé
- Abdoulaye Bathily
- Clément Cailleau
- Abdou Karim Camara
- Seydou Cissokho
- Karim Coulibaly
- Mohamed Coulibaly (footballer, born 1988)
- Abdoulaye Diakité
- Sidiki Kaba
- Aïda Mbaye
- Mame Bassine Niang
- Nafi Toure

== Economy ==
The economy of Tambacounda is based primarily on agriculture, with cash crops including cotton and peanuts. Mining plays a role in the southern part of the region around the city of Kedougou. The region is also home to the Niokolo-Koba National Park, the largest reserve in western Africa, which supports another leg of Tambacounda's economy, tourism.
