= Transport in Senegal =

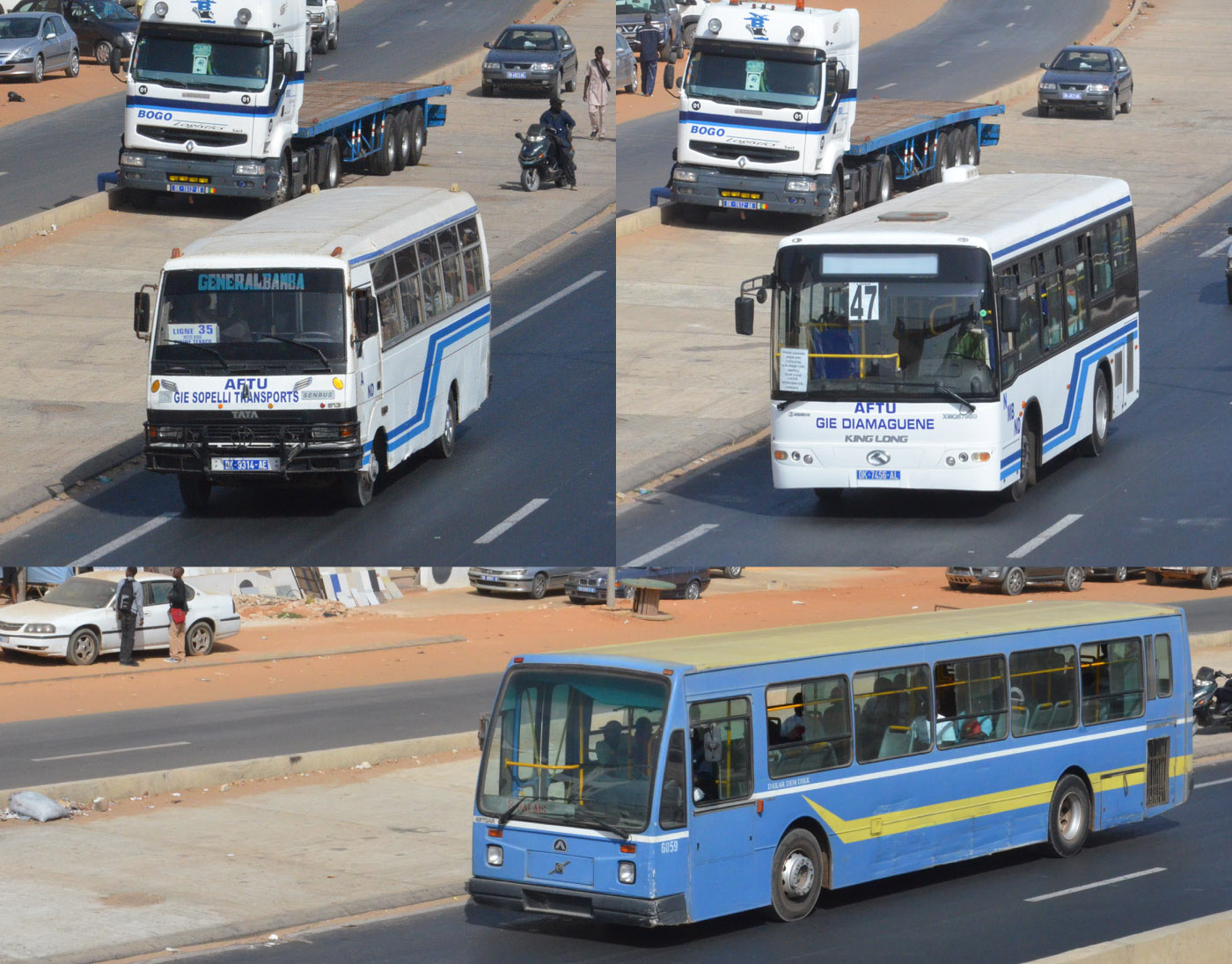
Various buses in Dakar

Senegal is a coastal country where maritime transport is possible. Also a developing country, its infrastructure is growing and is covered by air, rail road and water.

== Roads ==
The system of roads in Senegal is extensive by West African standards, with paved roads reaching each corner of the country and all major towns.

=== International highways ===
Dakar is the endpoint of three routes in the Trans-African Highway network. These are as follows:

- The Cairo–Dakar Highway, which crosses the edge of the Sahara.
- The Trans-Sahelian Highway, which links the countries of the Sahel, also called the Trans-Sahelian Highway.
- The Trans–West African Coastal Highway, running along the West African coast.

Senegal's road network links closely with those of the Gambia, since the shortest route between south-western districts on the one hand and west-central and north-western districts on the other is through the Gambia.

=== Motorways ===
The country currently has two autoroutes: Autoroute A1 and Autoroute A2. A third autoroute, Autoroute A3, is currently being planned.

Autoroute A1 runs from Dakar to M'Bour via Blaise Diagne International Airport. The A1 was built via a public-private partnership between French civil engineering firm Eiffage (which has a majority ownership in its toll road portion), and the Senegalese government.

Autoroute A2 runs from Dakar to Touba, via Thiès.

The planned Autoroute A3 will run from Dakar to Saint-Louis, and will span about 200 kilometres (120 mi) in length.

=== National roads ===
The most important roads in Senegal are prefixed "N" and numbered from 1 to 7:

- N1: Dakar – Mbour - Fatick - Kaolack – Tambacounda – Kidira – (Mali)
- N2: Pout – Thiès – Louga - St-Louis – Richard Toll – Ouro Sogui – Kidira - (Mali)
- N3: Thiès – Diourbel – Touba – Linguère – Ouro Sogui
- N4: Kaolack – (Trans-Gambia Highway) – Bignona – Ziguinchor – (Guinea-Bissau)
- N5: Bignona – Diouloulou – (Gambia) - Sokone - Kaolack
- N6: Tambacounda – Vélingara - Kolda – Ziguinchor – (Guinea-Bissau)
- N7: Ouro Sogui - Tambacounda – Niokolo-Koba – Kédougou – Guinea

=== Regional roads ===
- R20, R21, R22
- R30, R31, R32
- R60, R61
- R70

=== Major incidents ===
- Kaffrine bus crash (2023)

== Railways ==
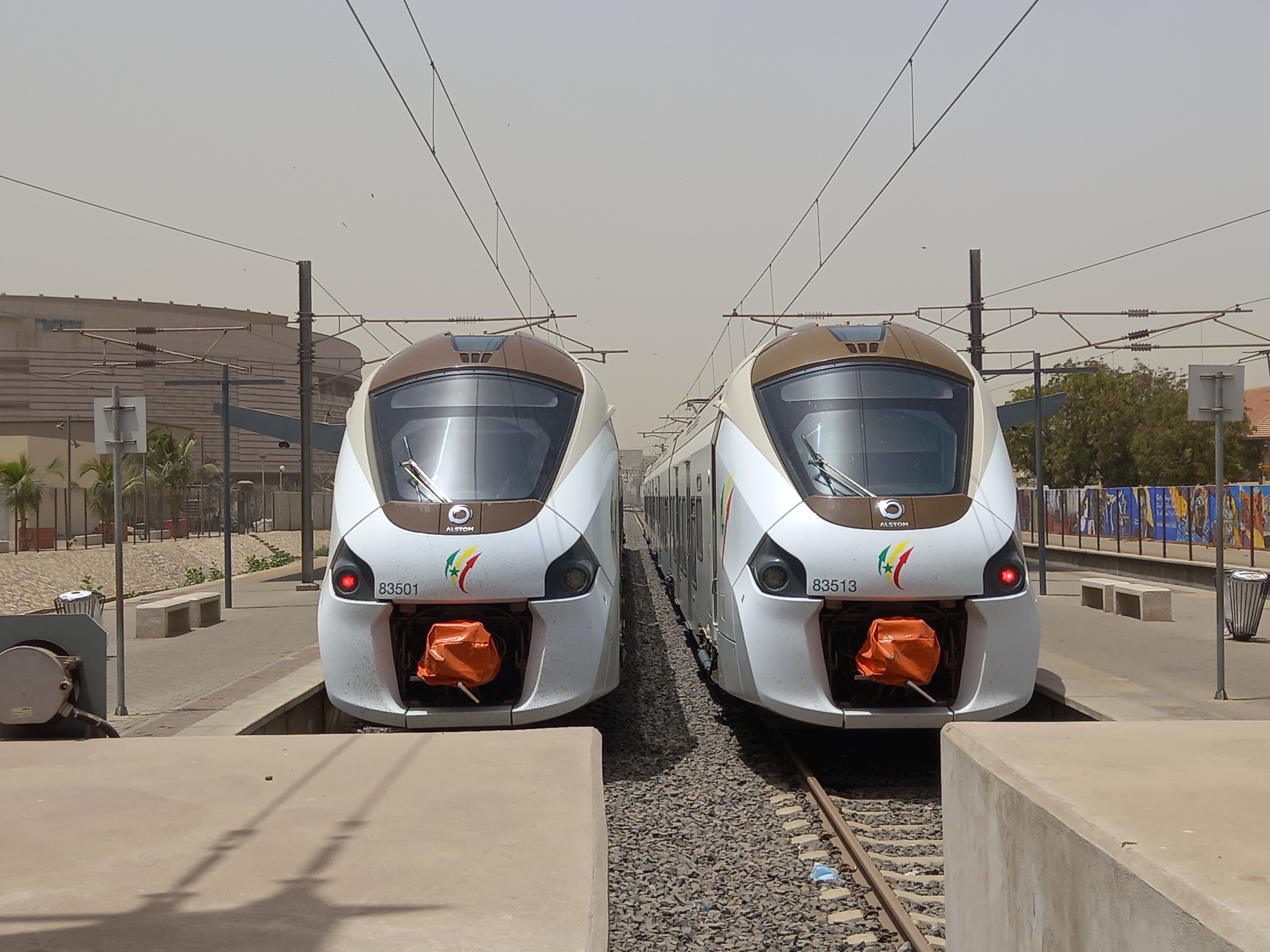
A pair of Train Express Regional Dakar-AIBD trains

According to the CIA World Factbook, Senegal had a total of 906 kilometres (563 mi) of railways as of 2017, of which 713 kilometres (443 mi) was operational, and all of which were 1,000 mm (3 ft 3 3/8 in) gauge. Since then, the first phase of the Train Express Regional Dakar-AIBD (TER Dakar) has begun operations in December 2021, adding 36 kilometres (22 mi) to Senegal's railway network. There are plans to add another 19 kilometres (12 mi) to the TER Dakar, to connect it to Blaise Diagne International Airport. Unlike the rest of Senegal's network, the TER Dakar uses standard gauge.

Other rail lines in Senegal include the partially-operational Dakar–Saint-Louis railway, which is used for freight, and the Dakar–Niger Railway. The Petit train de banlieue provided commuter rail service until 2016, and has since been replaced with the TER Dakar.

=== Maps ===
- UN Map

== Land transport ==
There were an estimated 4,271 kilometres (2,654 mi) of paved roads and 10,305 kilometres (6,403 mi) of unpaved roads as of 1996.

Dakar has a bus rapid transit (BRT) network: Sunu BRT, which currently has two routes in operation, with two more planned.

Taxis (black-yellow or blue-yellow in color) are cheap, numerous and available in all parts Dakar. It is customary to negotiate the fare since most meters installed in the taxis are broken or missing. For travel outside Dakar, public transportation is available but often unreliable and uncomfortable.

=== Car rapide ===
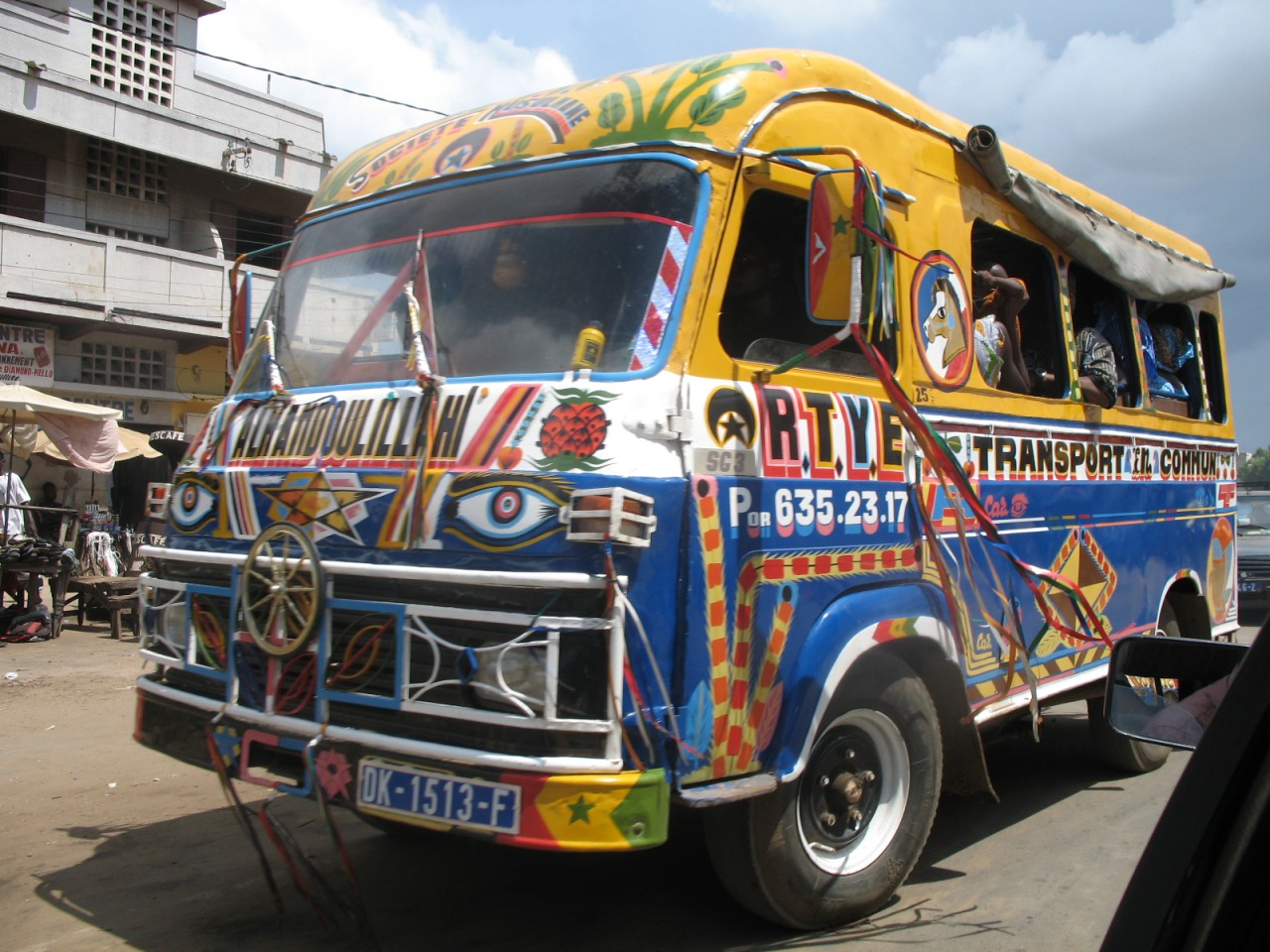
A car rapide

The car rapide (lit. 'fast car' in French) was a common method of land transport in urban Senegal. Their use began in 1976 when Saviem Super Galions—manufactured by Renault—were shipped to Senegal. Painted blue and yellow, they were colorful and often included imagery and slogans of Sufism, and eyes on the front. They were often packed with riders and prone to crashing. In 2016, the Senegalese government announced their plan to fund larger buses in Dakar and abandon the car rapides. A car rapide is exhibited at the Musée de l'Homme.

== Waterways ==
897 kilometres (557 mi) total; 785 kilometres (488 mi) on the Senegal River, and 112 kilometres (70 mi) on the Saloum River.

== Ports and harbours ==
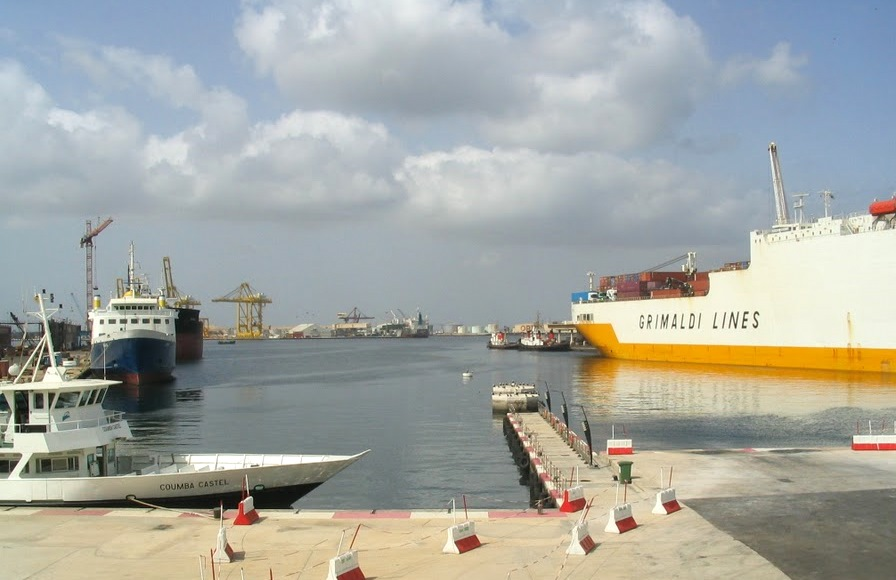
A port in Dakar

- Dakar - railhead
- Kaolack, Matam, Podor, Richard Toll, Saint-Louis, Ziguinchor

Dakar has one of the largest deep-water seaports along the West African coast. Its deep-draft structure and 640-foot-wide (200 m) access channel allows round-the-clock access to the port. Its current infrastructure includes tanker vessel loading and unloading terminals, a container terminal with a storage capacity of 3000 20-foot-equivalent units, a cereals and fishing port, a dedicated phosphate terminal and a privately run ship repair facility. The port's location at the extreme western point of Africa, at the crossroad of the major sea-lanes linking Europe to South America, makes it a natural port of call for shipping companies. Total freight traffic averages 10 million metric tons.

Additionally, shipments destined for Dakar must comply with Senegal’s Electronic cargo tracking note (ECTN) regime, commonly issued locally as a Bordereau Électronique de Suivi des Cargaisons (BSC or sometimes BESC). it must be completed and validated in the country’s system and the certificate number shown on the Bill of lading before the vessel departs the Port of Loading. Failure to present a validated BSC/ECTN (or failure to have it referenced correctly on the master bill of lading) can lead to fines, clearance delays, or cargo being held at the Port of Dakar, so shippers and freight forwarders typically obtain the validated certificate well before shipment.

== Airports ==
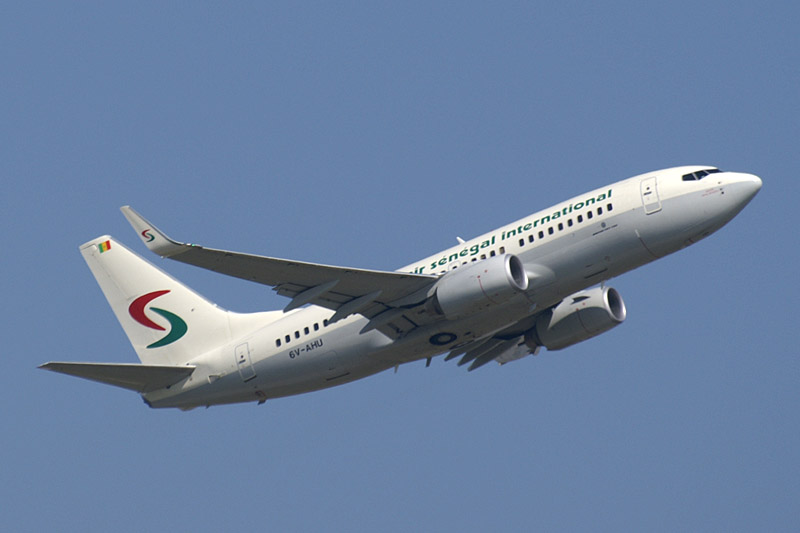
Air Sénégal International is Senegal's flag carrier.

Per the CIA World Factbook, Senegal has 20 airports as of 2025. Blaise Diagne International Airport in Diass became the hub of the sub-region. Dakar is linked to numerous African cities by air, and daily flights go to Europe. Delta Air Lines flies daily to/from Atlanta/Dakar/Johannesburg. South African Airways flies daily to New York City and Washington, D.C. from Johannesburg via Dakar. The Léopold Sédar Senghor International Airport in Dakar is now a cargo hub.

== See also ==
- Senegal
