= Trans-Gambia Highway =

Road in The Gambia and Senegal

Coordinates: 13°30′59″N 15°34′15″W

Location
- Country: Gambia

Highway system
- Transport in the Gambia

The Trans-Gambia Highway is a major highway in The Gambia, running across the centre of the nation in a north–south direction.

Within the Gambia, the highway consists of two main stretches, the North Bank Road and South Bank Road, each corresponding to the parts of the country on either side of the Gambia River. The two roads are connected via the Senegambia bridge between Farafenni and Soma, as well as bridges at Basse Santa Su and Fatoto, at the far eastern end of the country. Prior to the building of these bridge, the crossings were served by a ferry. Aside from a short four-lane section in Kombo, both the North Bank and South Bank roads are paved two lane highways.

The road is also economically important for Senegal, in which it is designated as the N4 road.

== Geography ==
The Gambia is an elongated state forming a country that is almost surrounded by Senegal (but not an enclave, as it also borders the Atlantic Ocean). The Gambia almost separates the Casamance region from the remainder of Senegal, with the only land borders being through dense, uninhabited forest.

=== South Bank Road ===
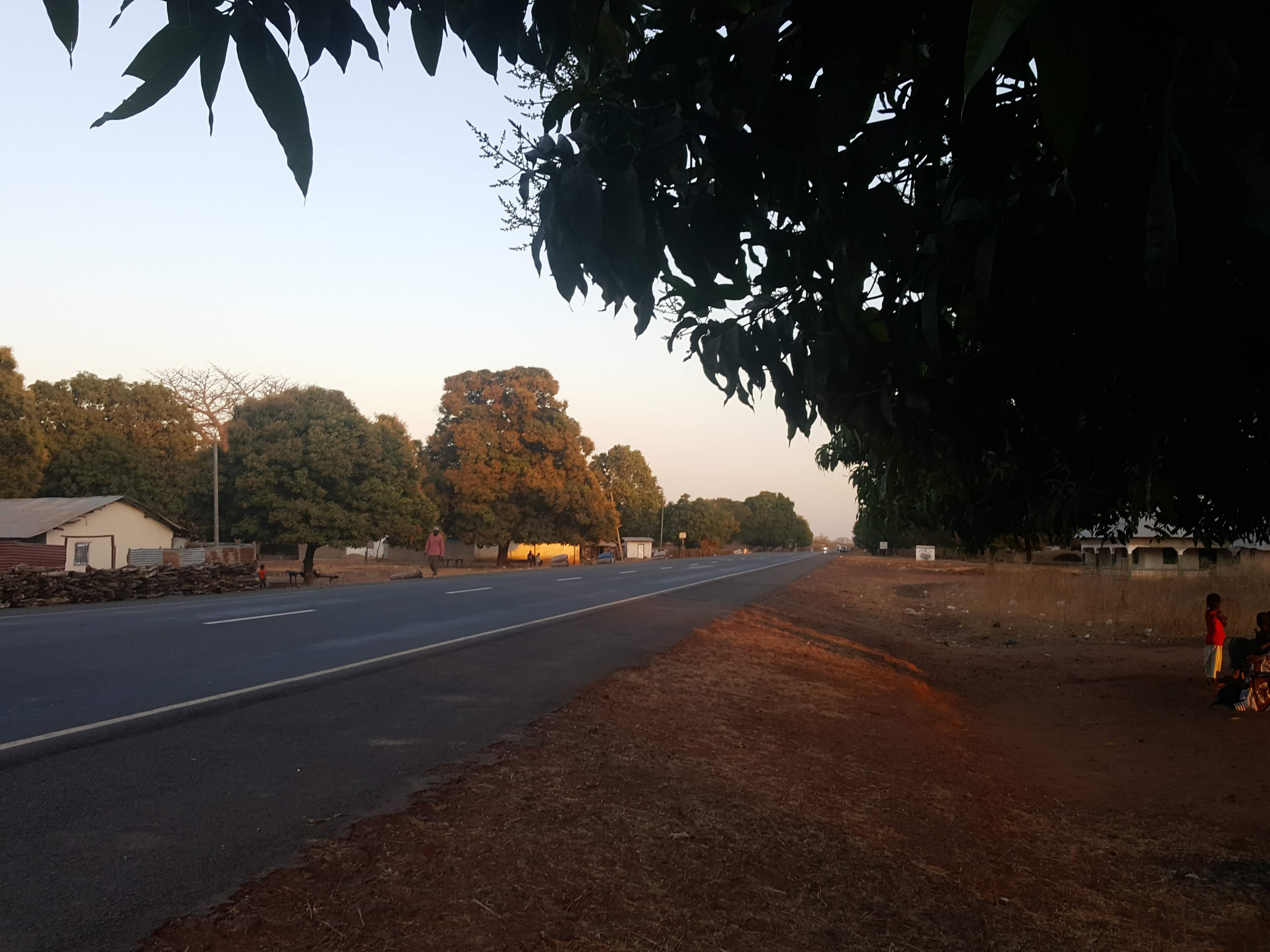
The South Bank Road in the Central River Division

The southern portion of the Trans-Gambia Highway begins in the island capital city, Banjul, before crossing onto the mainland at the Denton Bridge. From here, the route passes through metropolitan Kombo and the principal cities of Kanifing, Serekunda, and Yundum, where it passes near the Banjul International Airport. Leaving the capital, the route proceeds along the full length of the southern half of the country, connecting the major towns of Brikama (36 km), Soma (185 km), Janjanbureh (319 km), Bansang (335 km), and Basse Santa Su (396 km) before terminating at Fatoto (436 km).

At Soma, the highway intersects with an extension of the Trans-Gambia Highway (also known as Senegal Route N4) that provides northward access to the town of Farafenni, on Gambia's northern bank, via the Senegambia Bridge. If taken south into Senegal, N4 provides access to Casamance and Ziguinchor.

=== North Bank Road ===
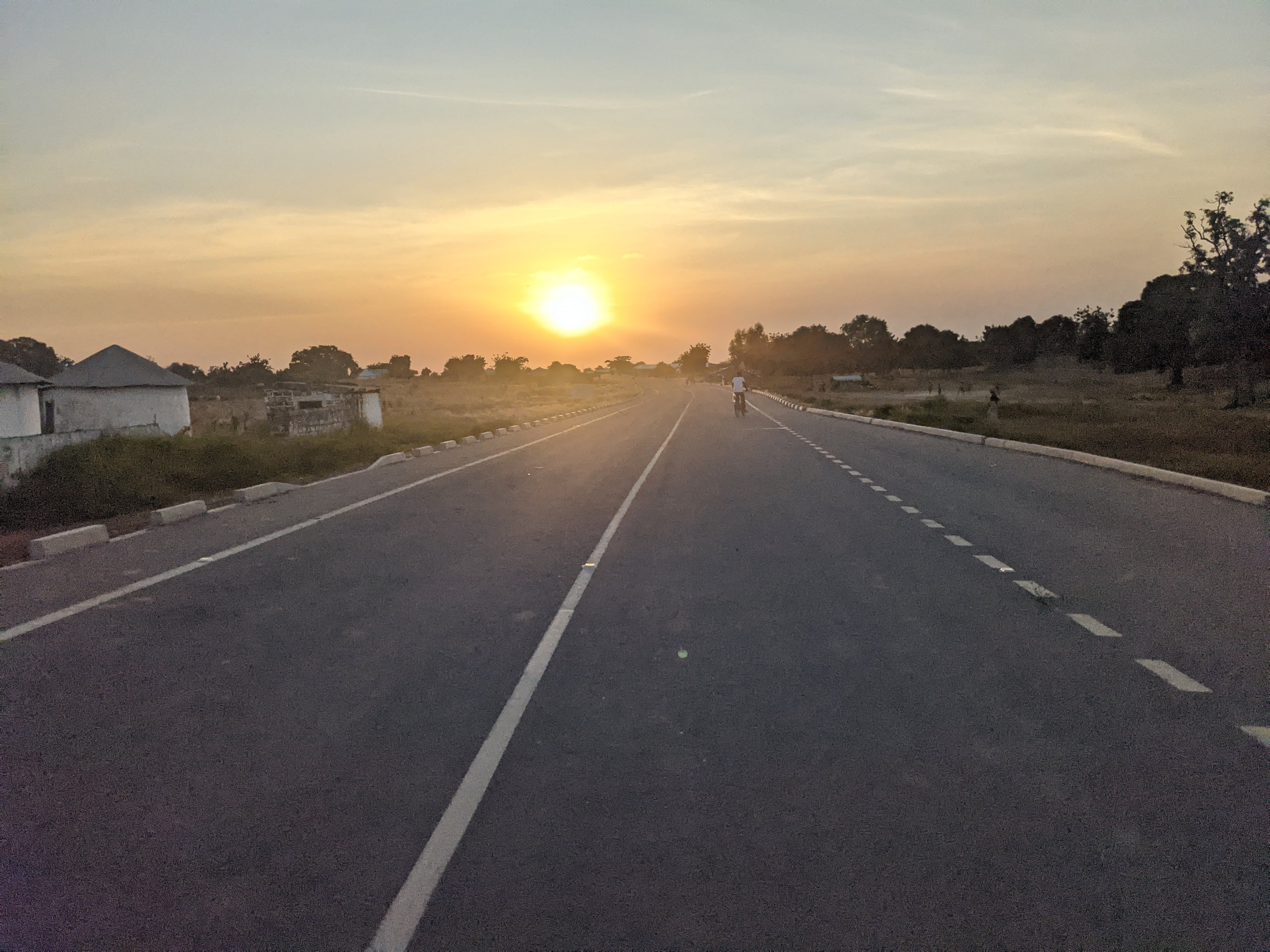
The North Bank Highway in Sutukoba

The northern portion of the highway begins at Barra, at the Banjul–Barra Ferry. Heading eastward, the route traverses the full northern half of the country, passing through the major towns of Farafenni (113 km), Wassu (207 km), Laminkoto (227 km), and Sutukoba (325 km) before reaching the river ferry at Fatoto. A branch road extends south from Yerobawol village on the road to Basse Santa Su, where there is a bridge over the river.

At Farafenni, the highway connects with the extension of the Trans-Gambia Highway (Route N4) that crosses the River Gambia at the Senegambia Bridge, linking the northern half of the Gambia with the town of Soma and points southward in Senegal. Taking N4 northward, meanwhile, leads into Senegal, in the direction of Kaolack and, eventually, Dakar.

=== Senegal ===
The Trans-Gambia Highway provides the most important connection between the two parts of Senegal. As the N4, it runs from Kaolack and Nioro, across Gambia and then into Bignona and Ziguinchor in the Casamance. The actual Gambian section is only 25 km long.

== History ==
With establishment of the Gambia River Development Organization in 1978, plans for a bridge were developed. Despite being repeatedly raised, these plans have not come to fruition.

In August 2005, the Gambia River Authority doubled the prices for the ferry crossing. In response, the Government of Senegal closed the border crossings. The prices were reduced at the beginning of October, but Senegal felt the issue was unresolved and threatened that they would construct a tunnel under Gambia, with the claimed support of China.

The Senegambia Bridge opened in 2019. The bridges at Basse and Fatoto, funded by the Chinese government, opened in October 2021.

== See also ==
- Transport in Gambia
- Transport in Senegal
