= N1 road (Senegal) =

Road in Senegal

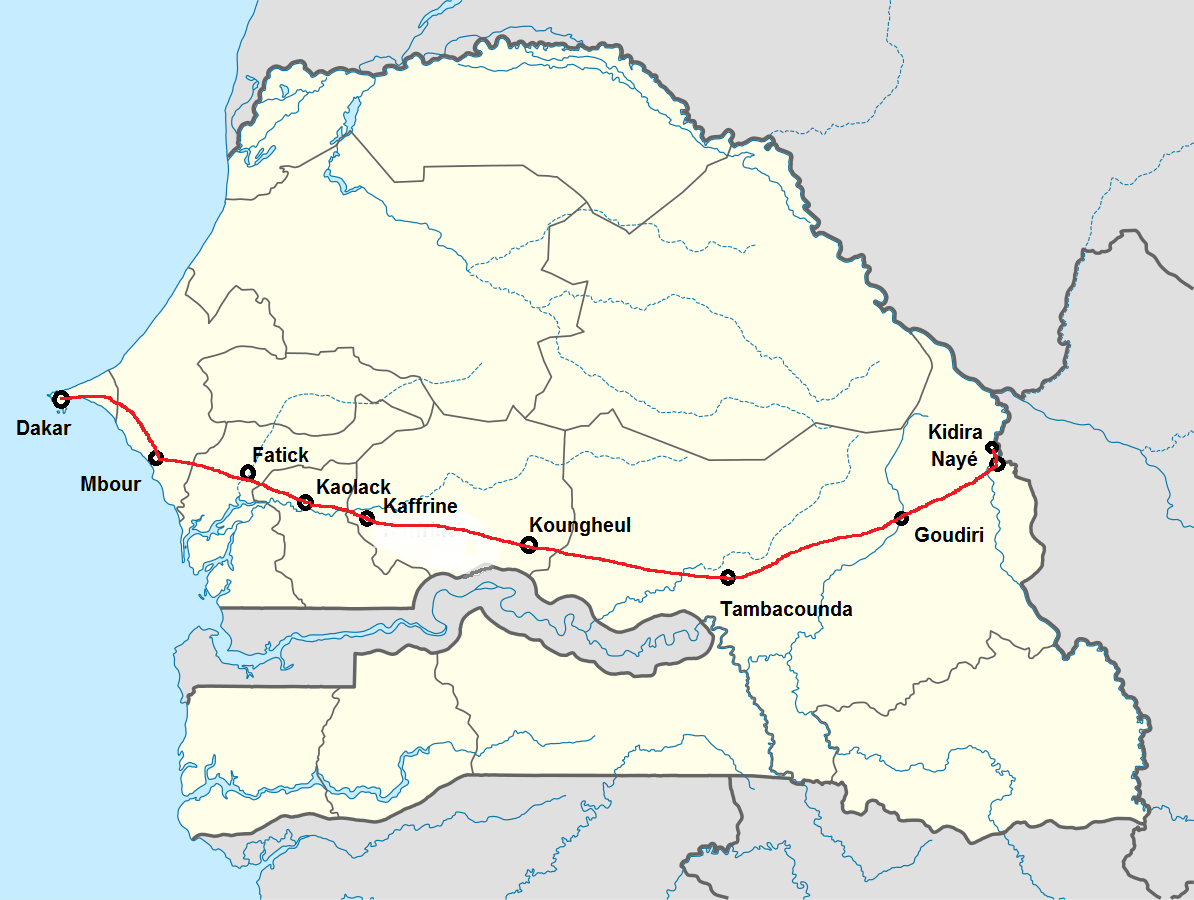

Location
- Country: Senegal

Highway system
- Transport in Senegal

The N1 road is one of the national roads of Senegal. It connects the west and the east of the country by a direct route across the middle from the capital Dakar via Mbour, Fatick, Kaolack, Kaffrine, Koungheul, Tambacounda, Goudiry to Nayé and Kidira on the border with Mali. It connects with the N4 at Kaolack and the N2 at Kidira.

== See also ==
- N2 road
- N3 road
- N4 road
- N5 road
- N6 road
- N7 road
- Transport in Senegal
- List of roads in Senegal
