= N4 road (Senegal) =

Road in Senegal

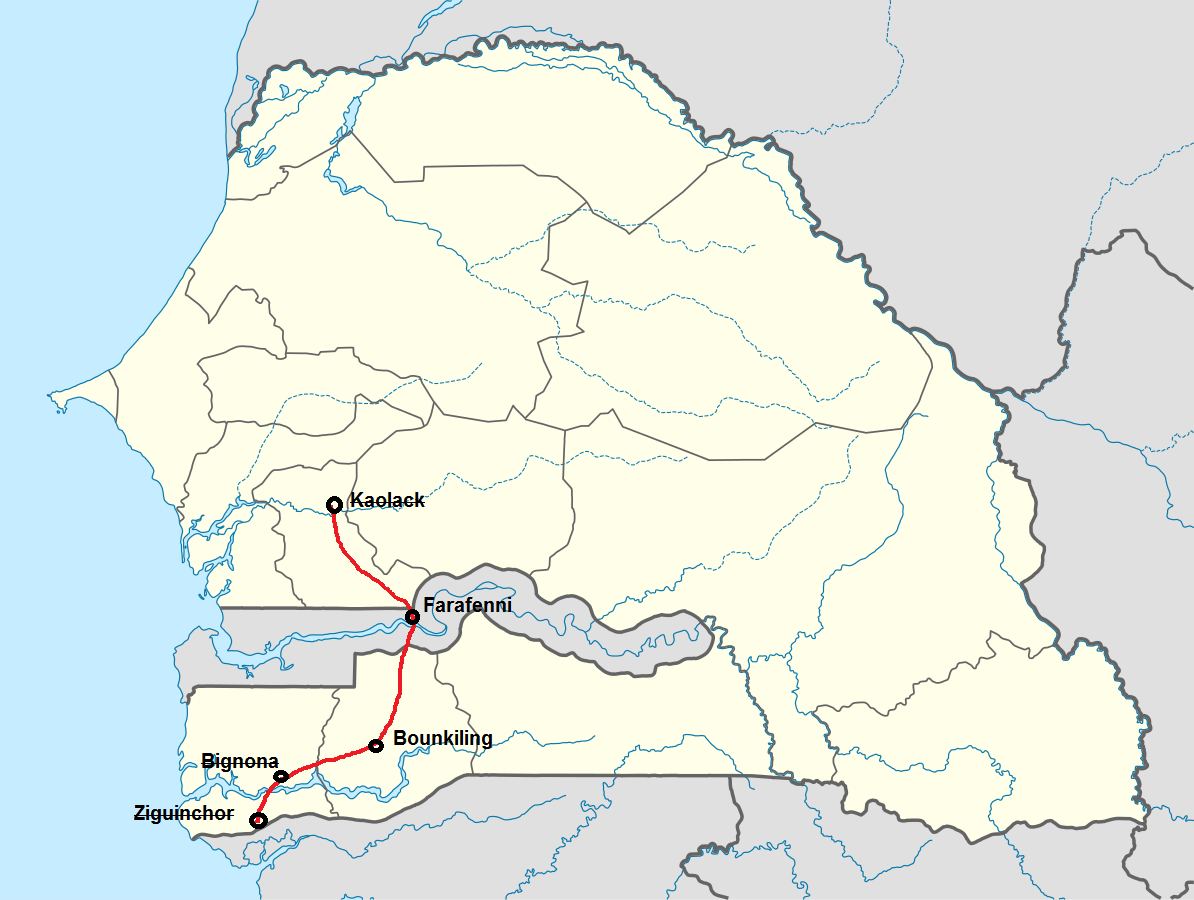

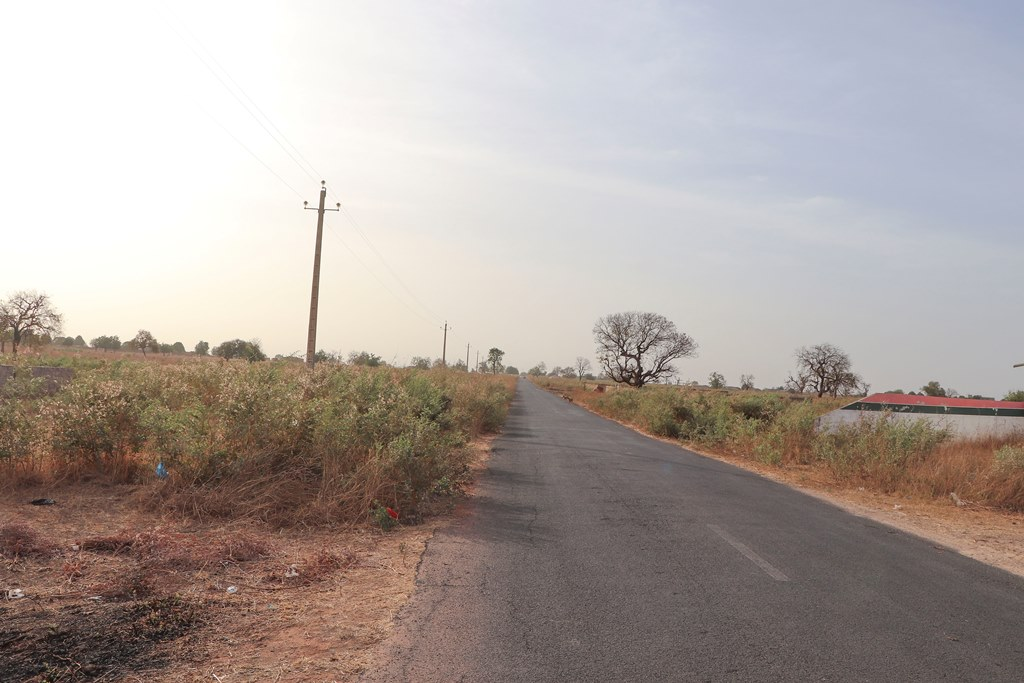

Location
- Country: Senegal

Highway system
- Transport in Senegal

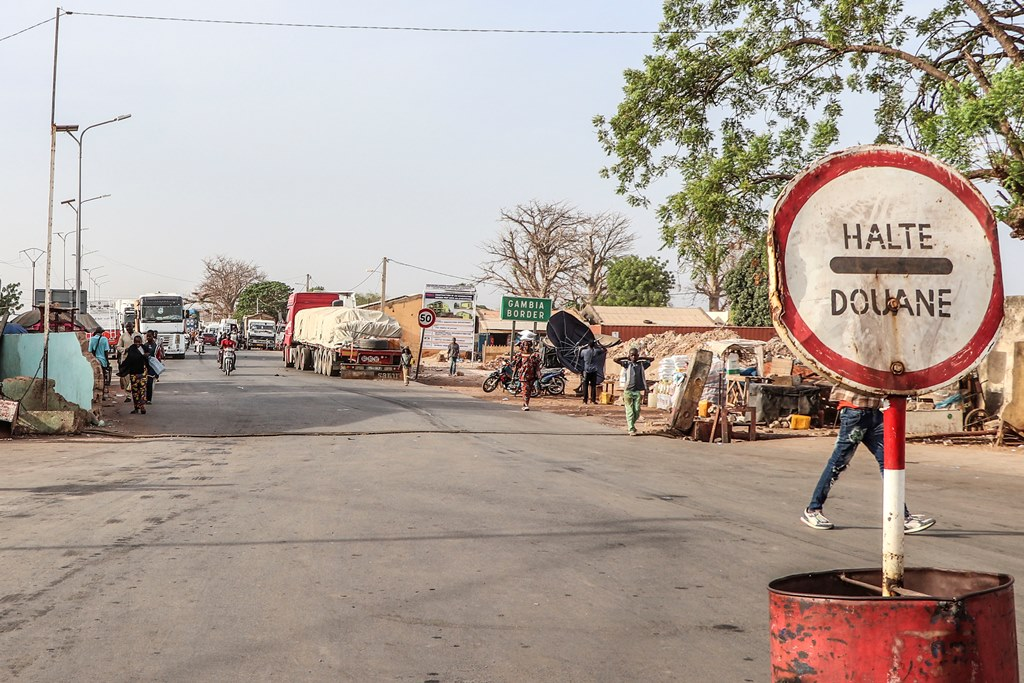
N4 crossing Senegal Gambia border at Farafenni

The N4 road is one of the 7 national roads in Senegal. It connects central-Senegal with Basse Casamance by a route which crosses The Gambia.

The road runs in a southerly direction from Diourbel to Kaolack where it crosses the Saloum River before heading to Bounkiling in Casamance via The Gambia and swinging south-westward to follow the northern bank of the Casamance River to Bignona. Turning southwards the road crosses the Casamance River to end in Ziguinchor. The route is 337 km long including the 25 km transit route in The Gambia.

The road traverses central Gambia as the Trans-Gambia Highway linking Farafenni in the north to Soma in the south, crossing the Gambia River on the Senegambia Bridge.

It connects with the N3 at Djourbel, with the N1 at Kaolack and with the N6 at Ziguinchor.

An alternative route is the N5 via Bignona and Banjul, crossing the Gambia river by ferry at Banjul and rejoining the N4 just south of Kaolack.

== See also ==
- N1 road
- N2 road
- N3 road
- N5 road
- N6 road
- N7 road
- Trans-Gambia Highway
- Transport in Senegal
