= Pakala Forest Park =

Protected area in the Gambia

- IUCN category IV (habitat/species management area)
- Interactive map of Pakala Forest Park
- Location: North Bank Division Gambia
- Nearest city: Farafenni
- Coordinates: 13°34′0″N 15°38′0″W
- Area: 1,161 ha (2,870 acres)es
- Established: 1 January 1954

Pakala Forest Park is a protected area in the Gambia covering 1,161 ha (2,870 acres). It was established in January 1954.

The national park is located at an altitude of 41 meters.
