= Senegambia (disambiguation) =

Senegambia is a region of West Africa, encompassing the modern states of Senegal, The Gambia, and Guinea-Bissau. Senegambia may also refer to:

== Political entities ==
- Senegambia Confederation, a loose confederation of Senegal and The Gambia from 1982–1989
- Senegambia (Dutch West India Company), fortifications of the DWIC in the region from 1617–1678
- Senegambia and Niger, administrative unit of French West Africa from 1902–1904
- Province of Senegambia, British West African colony from 1765–1779

== Bridge ==
- Senegambia bridge, a bridge in the Gambia which crosses the Gambia River

== Other uses ==
- Senegambian stone circles, ancient stone circles in Senegal and The Gambia
- Senegambian languages, branch of Niger–Congo languages in the region
