= N7 road (Senegal) =

Highway in Senegal

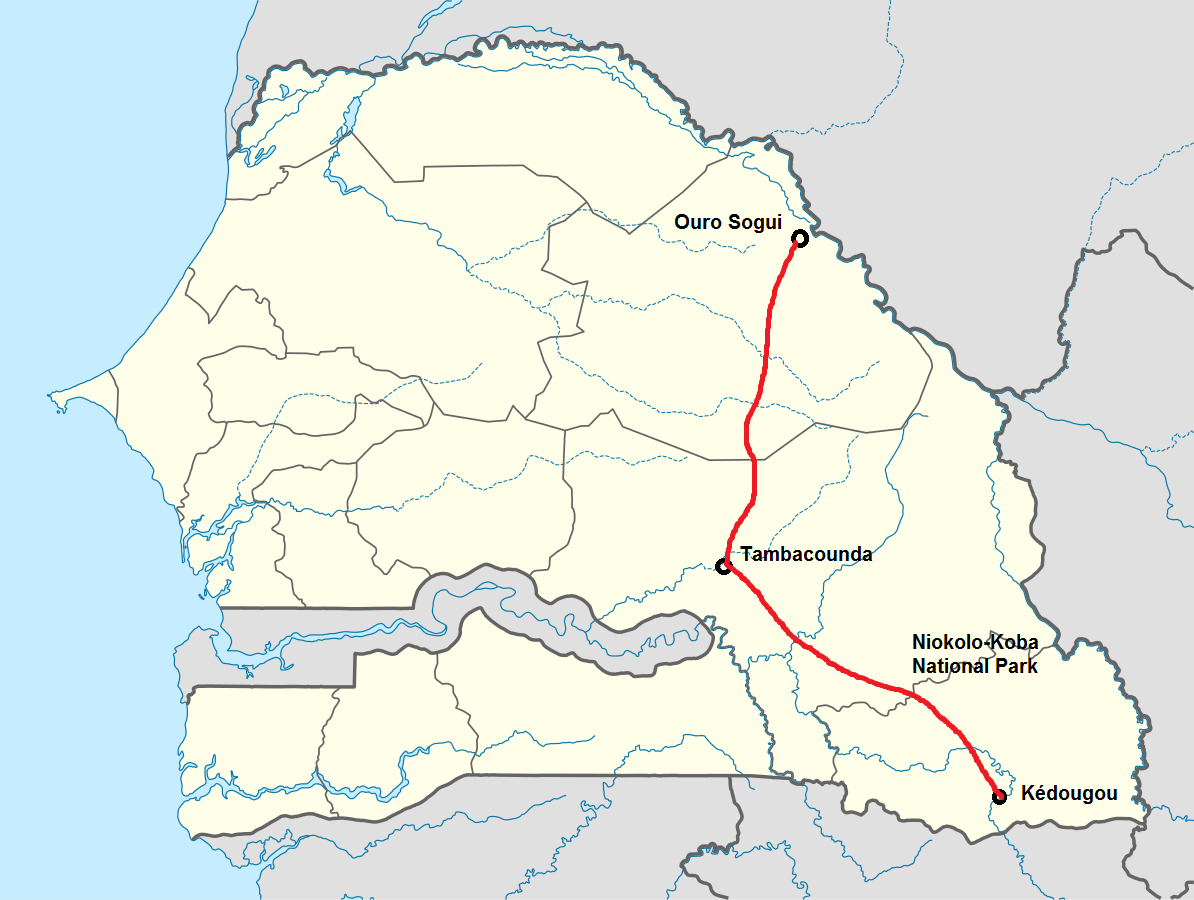

Location
- Country: Senegal

Highway system
- Transport in Senegal

The N7 road is one of the 7 national roads of Senegal. It connects Ouro Sogui in the north-east of Senegal to Kédougou in the south-east by a route which crosses the Niokolo-Koba National Park.

The road runs in a southerly direction from Ouro Sogui to Tambacounda where it crosses the N1 road before heading south-east, via the Niokolo-Koba National Park, to Kédougou on the borders of Mali and Guinea.

== See also ==
- N1 road
- N2 road
- N3 road
- N4 road
- N5 road
- N6 road
- Transport in Senegal
