= N6 road (Senegal) =

Road in Senegal

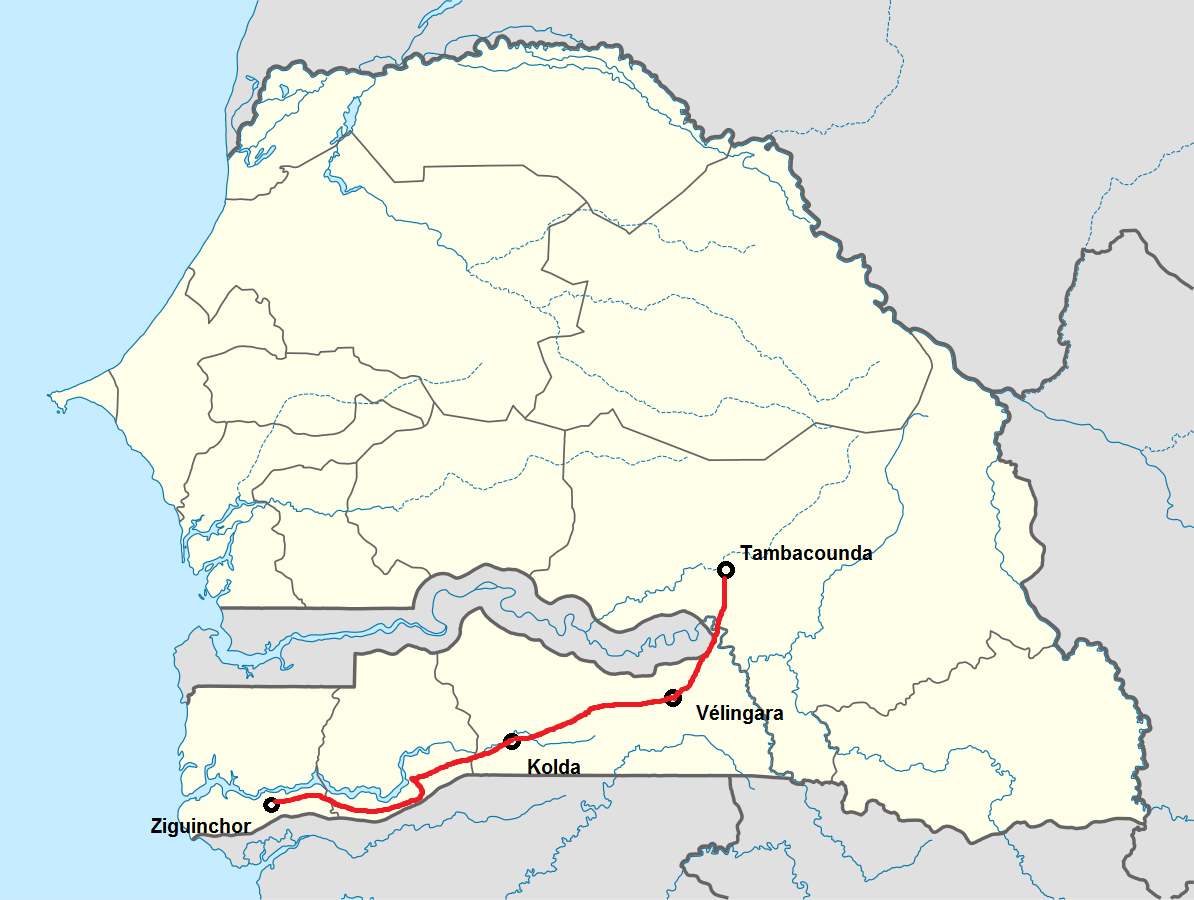

Location
- Country: Senegal

Highway system
- Transport in Senegal

The N6 road is one of the 7 national roads of Senegal. It connects Tambacounda in the centre of Senegal to Ziguinchor in Basse Casamance in the south by a route which avoids traversing the Gambia. It is also known as the Route du Sud.

The road runs in a southerly direction from Tambacounda before swinging westwards to follow the southern bank of the Casamance River via Vélingara and Kolda to Ziguichor, where it connects to the N4 road.

== See also ==
- N1 road
- N2 road
- N3 road
- N4 road
- N5 road
- N7 road
- Transport in Senegal
