= N2 road (Senegal) =

Highway in Senegal

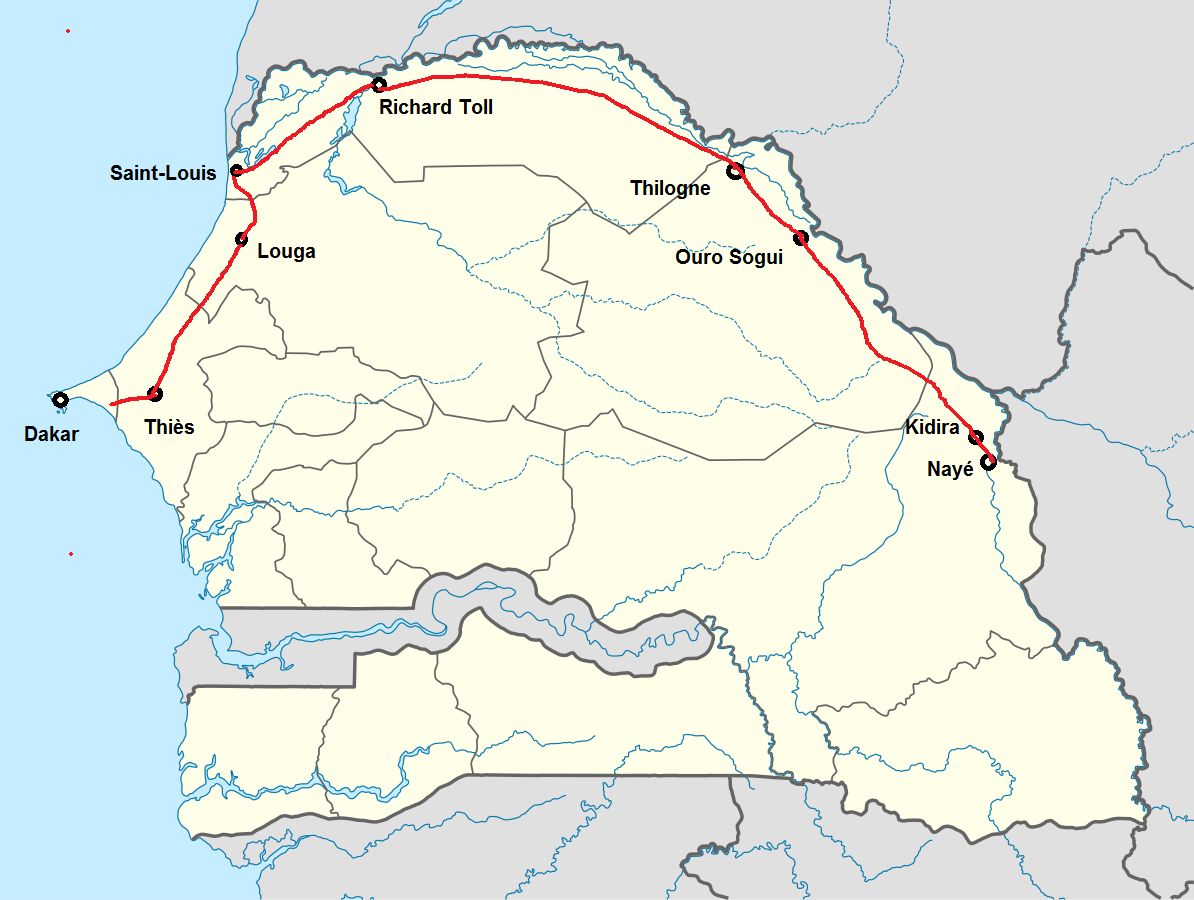

Location
- Country: Senegal

Highway system
- Transport in Senegal

The N2 road is one of the national roads of Senegal. It connects the west and the east of the country in a large arc following the northern frontier from the outskirts of the capital Dakar via Thiès, Louga, Saint-Louis, Richard Toll, Thilogne, Ouro Sogui, Kidira and Nayé on the border with Mali.

== See also ==
- N1 road
- N3 road
- N4 road
- N5 road
- N6 road
- N7 road
- Transport in Senegal
