= Jumba Yaka Forest Park =

- IUCN category IV (habitat/species management area)
- Interactive map of Jumba Yaka Forest Park
- Location: Central River Division Gambia
- Nearest city: Farafenni
- Coordinates: 13°42′6″N 15°26′5″W
- Area: 405 ha (1,000 acres)
- Established: January 1, 1954

Jumba Yaka Forest Park is a forest park in Central River Division in the Gambia. Established on January 1, 1954, it covers 405 hectares.

The estimate terrain elevation above sea level is 47 metres.
