= Belel Forest Park =

- Interactive map of Belel Forest Park
- Location: Central River Division Gambia
- Nearest city: Farafenni
- Coordinates: 13°40′39″N 15°22′34″W
- Area: 449.2 ha (1,110 acres)
- Established: January 1, 1954

Belel Forest Park is a forest park in the Gambia. Established on January 1, 1954, it covers 449.2 hectares.

The average altitude of the terrain above sea level is 28 meters.
