= N5 road (Senegal) =

Road in Senegal

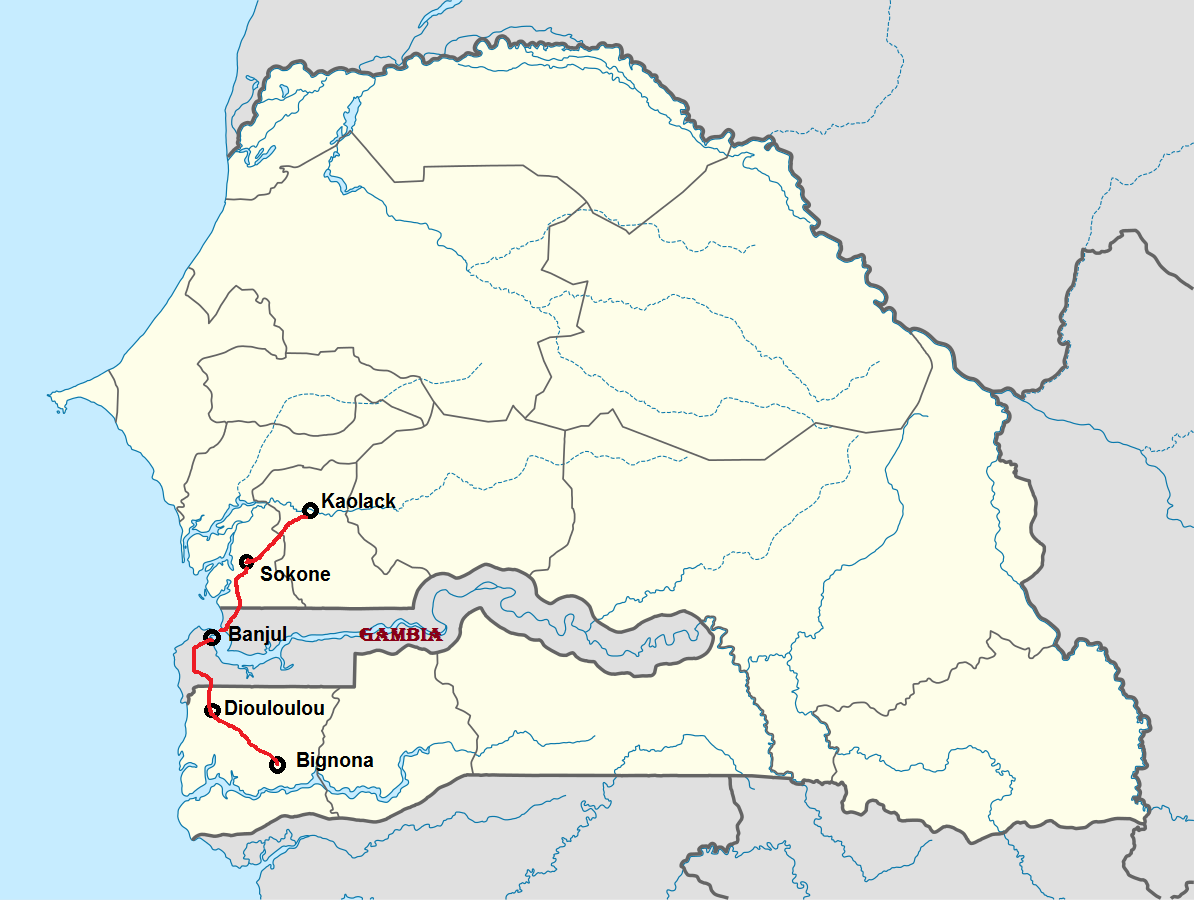

Location
- Country: Senegal

Highway system
- Transport in Senegal

The N5 road is one of the 7 national roads of Senegal. It connects the centre of Senegal to Basse Casamance in the south by a route which traverses the Gambia at the mouth of the River Gambia.

The road runs in a south-westerly direction from its junction with the N4 road at Kaolack via Sokone to the mouth of the River Gambia, where there is a ferry crossing to Banjul. From Banjul the road runs south-eastwards via Diouloulou to reconnect with the N4 at Bignona.

== See also ==
- N1 road
- N2 road
- N3 road
- N4 road
- N6 road
- N7 road
- Transport in Senegal
