= Senegambia bridge =

Senegambia Bridge
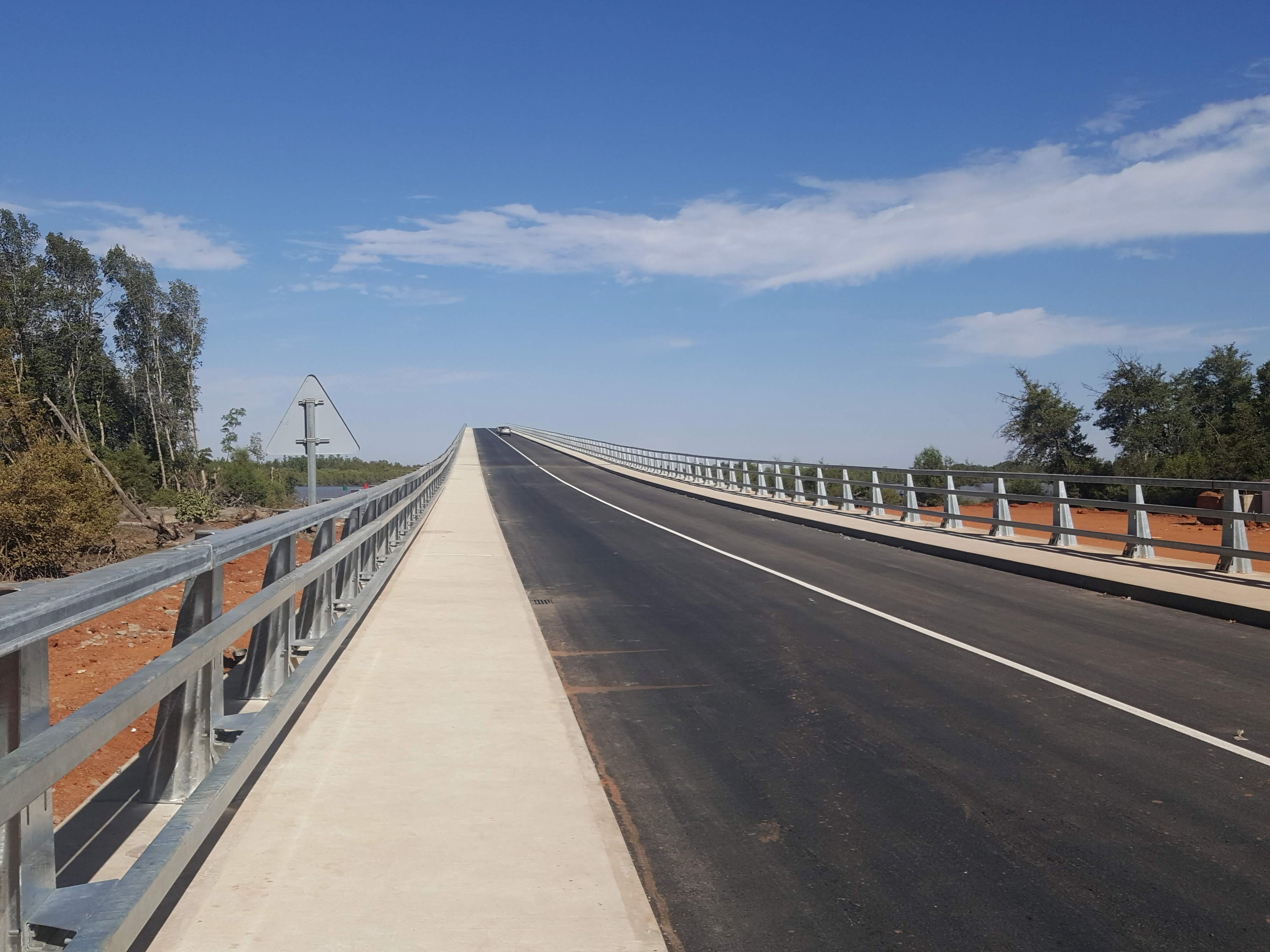
- Coordinates: 13°30′59″N 15°34′21″W
- Carries: Trans-Gambia Highway and Highway N4
- Crosses: Gambia River
- Locale: Bamba Tenda, Gambia and Yelitenda, Gambia
- Other name: Trans-Gambia Bridge
- Maintained by: National Roads Authority

Characteristics
- Total length: 1.9 kilometres (1.2 mi)
- Width: 12 metres (39 ft)
- Longest span: 100 metres (110 yd)

History
- Designer: BCEOM and SCET Tunisie
- Constructed by: Isolux Corsán and the Arezki Group
- Construction cost: US$ 93 million
- Opened: January 21, 2019

Statistics
- Toll: 50 Dalasi for cars

Location
- Interactive map of Senegambia Bridge

The Senegambia bridge, also known as the Trans-Gambia Bridge, is a bridge in The Gambia that carries the Trans-Gambia Highway connecting northern and southern Gambia. It also provides access to the isolated Casamance province from the rest of Senegal. A bridge had been proposed for this location in 1956 but political considerations delayed construction which finally began in 2015. Construction was funded largely by a loan of US$ 65 million from the African Development Bank, with the remaining funding coming from the Gambian government. Construction works were carried out by a joint venture of Spanish company Isolux Corsán and the Senegalese Arezki Group.

The bridge, made from reinforced concrete, opened to light vehicles on 21 January 2019. At 1.9 kilometres (1.2 mi) in length it is one of West Africa's longest bridges and includes a 100-metre-wide (110 yd) central span to facilitate continued use of the river by boats. The Senegambia bridge forms part of the Trans-Gambia Highway and the Trans–West African Coastal Highway.

== Situation ==
The bridge lies approximately 10 kilometres (6 mi) south of Farafenni, a Gambian town on the border with Senegal, and carries the Trans-Gambia Highway across the Gambia River, which runs east-west through The Gambia and splits the country in two. The river also prevents easy movement of people from the main portion of Senegal, which lies north of The Gambia, to its southern province of Casamance which is south of the river. Travellers had previously used a ferry crossing at this location, but it was unreliable and delays of 10–20 days waiting for a ferry were not uncommon. The alternative was a 400-kilometre (250 mi) detour eastwards to the next available crossing of the Gambia River. Development in Casamance had been hindered by the poor access to the rest of the country.

== Planning ==
The bridge was first mooted in 1956 and the French government committed funds for its construction in 1971 but the start of works was delayed by periods of strained tensions between Gambia and Senegal. The project was formerly led by the Organisation pour la Mise en Valeur du Fleuve Gambie (OMVG) which commissioned engineering feasibility studies of the scheme from French firm BCEOM and Tunisian firm SCET Tunisie in the 1990s. These studies were updated by the same companies between 2007 and 2009 and form the basis of the current design which has a 100-year design life.

Funding was finally secured through the African Development Fund (ADF) of the African Development Bank (ADB), which contributed US$ 65 million as lead lender for the project. The remaining funding was approved for the project by the Alliance for Patriotic Reorientation and Construction government of Gambia; who state that no contribution was made by Senegal. Approval to proceed was granted by the government of Gambia in 2011.

== Construction ==
Final design and planning work commenced in 2012 and construction began in 2015. Construction was led by a joint-venture of Spanish company Isolux Corsán and the Senegalese Arezki Group. The construction contract had a value of 51.7 million euros.

The structure is made of reinforced concrete and has a total length of 1.9 kilometres (1.2 mi)—of which the section that crosses the river is 942 metres (1,030 yd) long. It has piled foundations but unexpectedly thick layers of mud (up to 20 metres (66 ft) in depth) on the river banks caused delays in construction. It is one of the longest bridges in West Africa and incorporates a 100-metre-wide (110 yd) central span to allow for passage of boats along the river. The bridge deck is 12 metres (39 ft) wide and carries a 7.5-metre-wide (25 ft) single-carriageway road.

The bridge's official name is a portmanteau of the names of Senegal and Gambia and is intended to reflect the bonds of friendship between the two countries, but it is also known as the Trans-Gambia Bridge. Total project costs were $93 million. A large portion of the workforce were local: 58 % were Gambians and 20 % were from the wider ECOWAS countries.

The bridge's opening ceremony took place on 21 January 2019 and was led by Gambia's President Adama Barrow and Senegal's President Macky Sall who made the first official crossing of the bridge together shortly after 4:30 p.m. local time. Gambian Vice President Fatoumata Tambajang, the minister of works Bai Lamin Jobe and his Senegalese counterpart Abdoulaye Daouda Diallo were also in attendance. Zinguinchor mayor Abdoulaye Baldé and Senegalese national football team coach Aliou Cissé were also present and Senegalese musician Youssou Ndour performed music at the opening ceremony.

The bridge forms part of a link on the proposed Trans–West African Coastal Highway, part of the Trans-African Highway network. This project, spearheaded by the New Partnership for Africa's Development seeks to link Nouakchott in Mauritania with Lagos in Nigeria via a 15-country, 4,560-kilometre (2,830 mi) highway in the hope of boosting trade and co-operation in the region.

== Post-construction ==
It is hoped that the road will improve co-operation between Gambia and Senegal and facilitate trade in minerals, fuels and foodstuffs. It has had a marked effect on journey times; a trip by road from Dakar to Ziguinchor which previously took a day can now be completed within five hours. Local ferry operators and roadside vendors have complained about the loss of revenue following construction of the bridge.

There is a dispute between the Gambia Ferries Service and the National Roads Authority over which government agency is entitled to the revenue from the bridge. The Ministry of Works, Transport and Infrastructure has negotiated a temporary arrangement whereby the revenue is split between the two. The Gambian press has criticised the government for failing to set up a public–private partnership to ensure tolls fund the future maintenance of the structure.

== Gallery ==
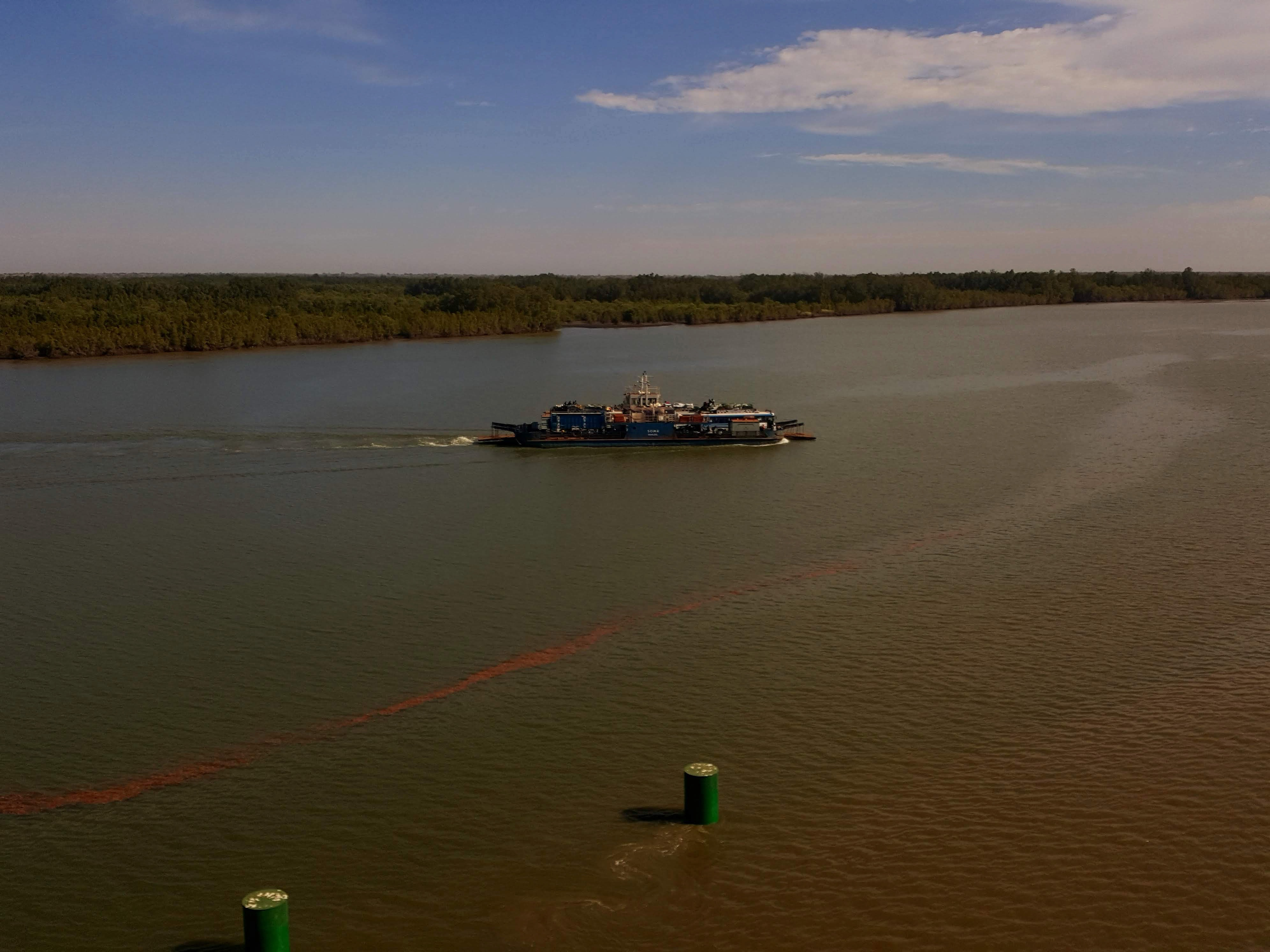
The vehicle ferry to be replaced by the completed bridge

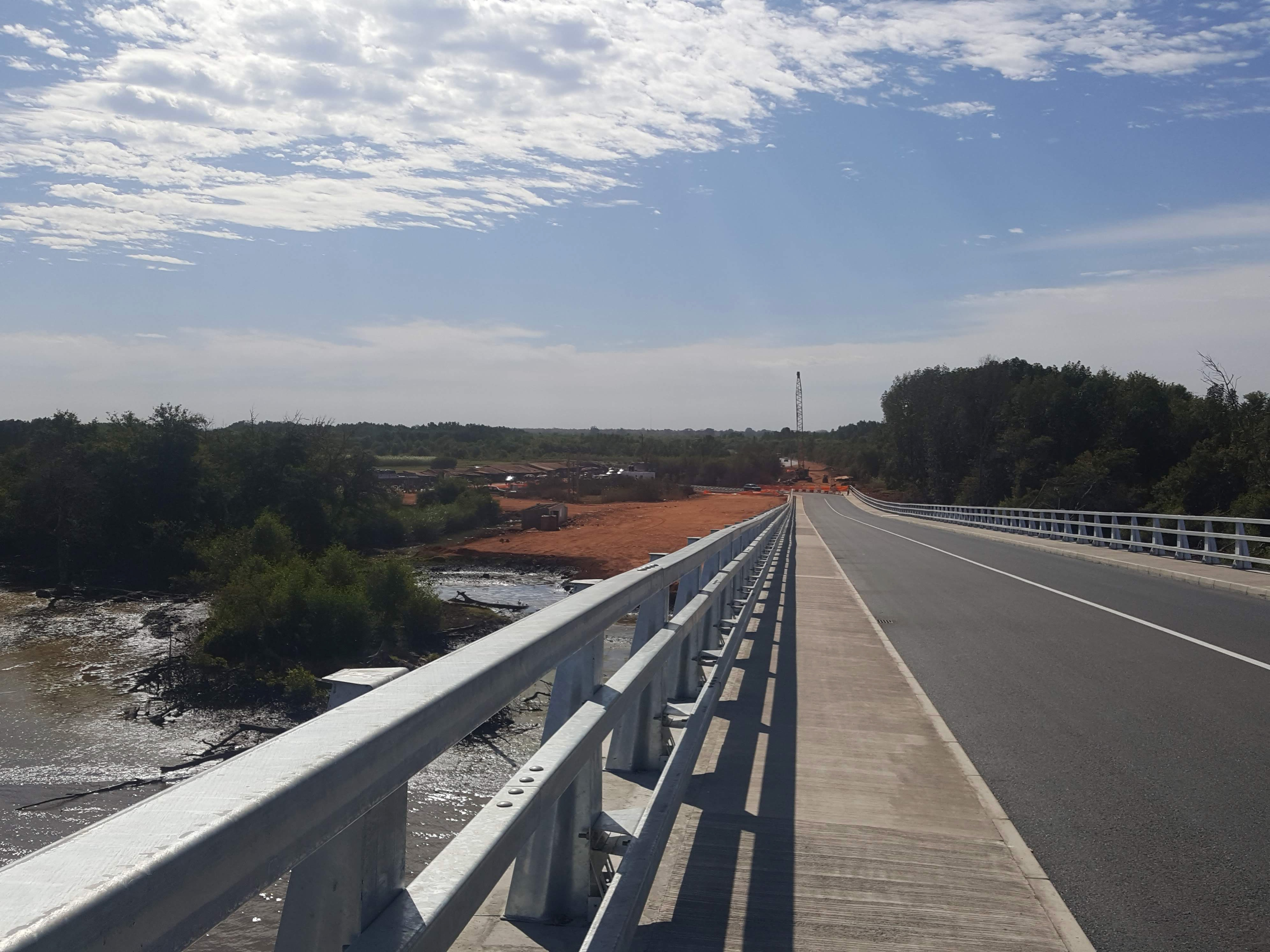
View to the south from the bridge peak, towards Soma

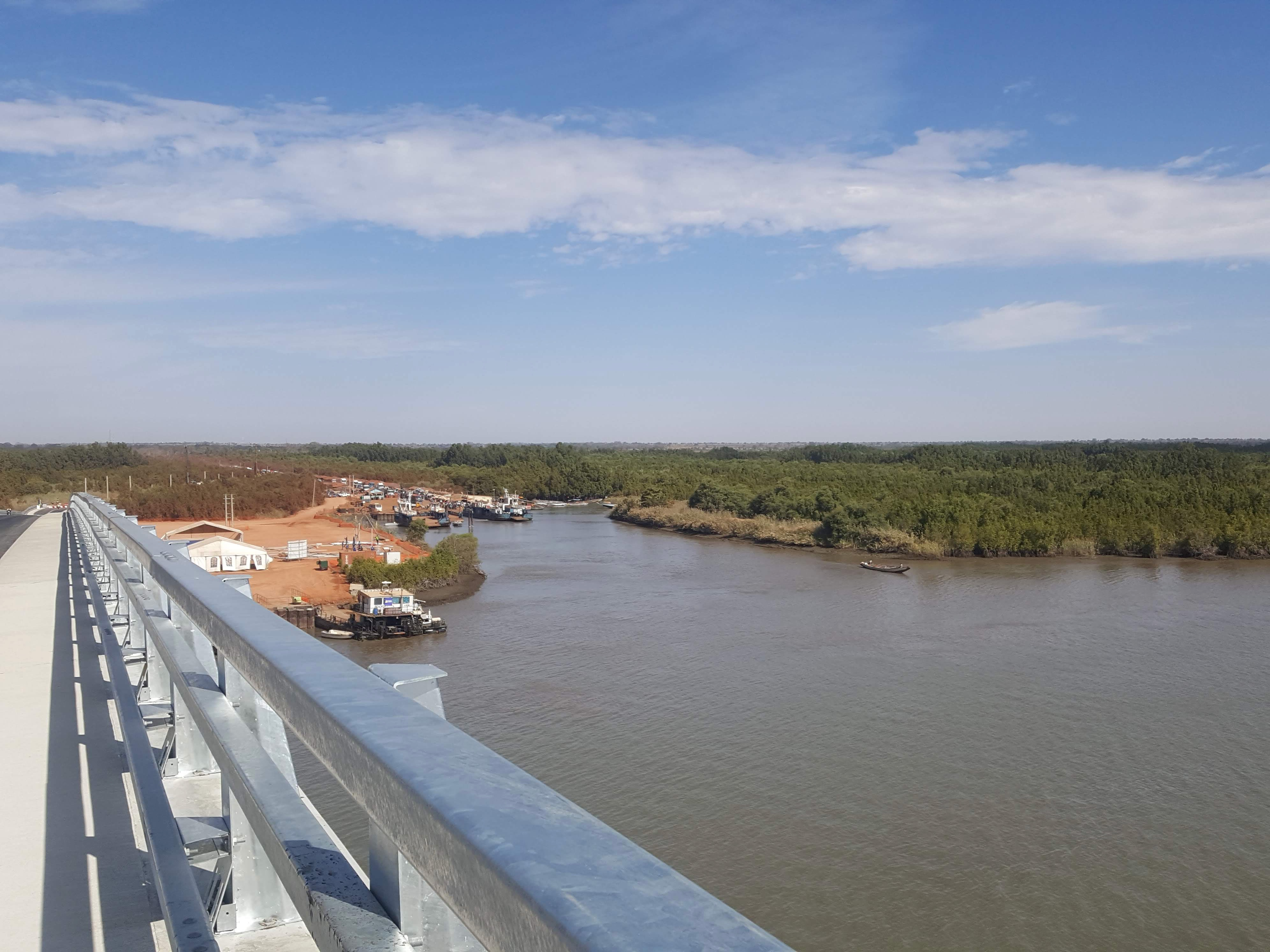
View to the north from the bridge peak, towards Farafenni
