= N3 road (Senegal) =

Road in Senegal

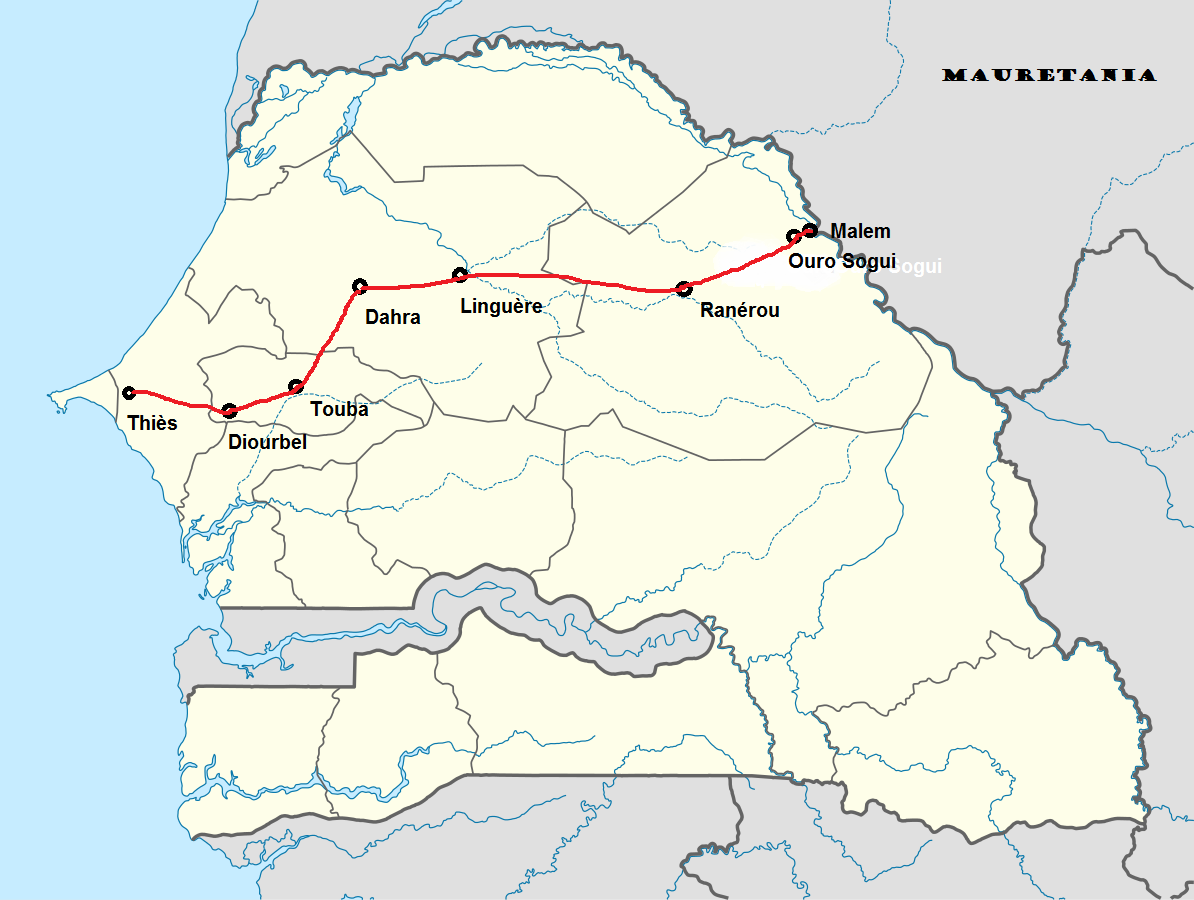

Location
- Country: Senegal

Highway system
- Transport in Senegal

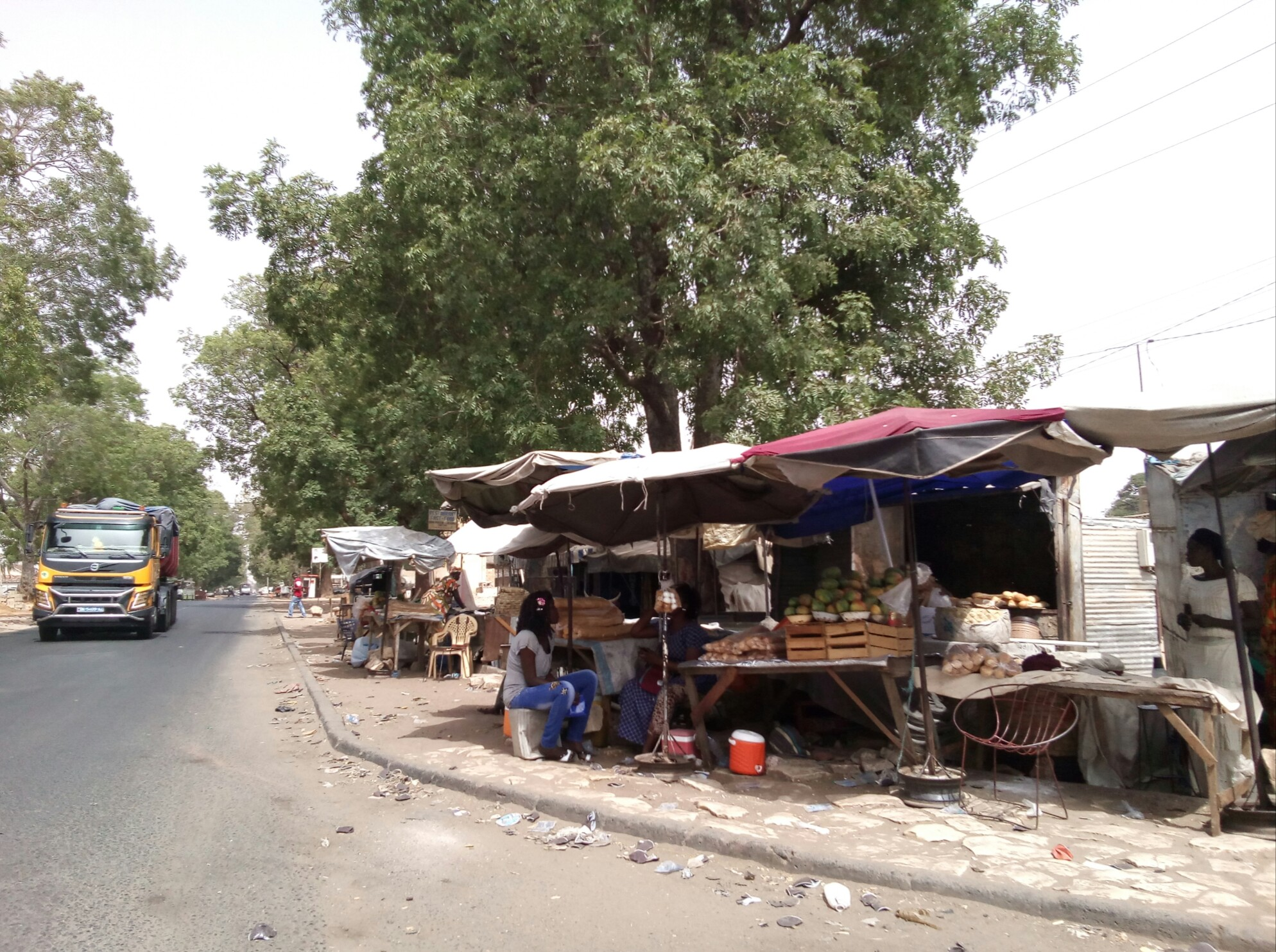
Between Thiès and Touba

The N3 road is one of the national roads of Senegal. It connects the west and the east of the country by a direct route across the middle from Thiès in the west via Bambey, Diourbel, Mbacké, Touba, Dahra, Linguère, and Ranérou to Ouro Sogui and Malem on the eastern border with Mauritania. The N3 connects with the N2 road at both ends (Thiès and Ouro Sogui).

== See also ==
- N1 road
- N2 road
- N4 road
- N5 road
- N6 road
- N7 road
- Transport in Senegal
