= Luis Delso Heras =

Spanish business management professional

Luis Delso Heras (born 1952) is a Spanish business management professional. He served as president of Isolux Corsán (2004–2016), in which capacity he has been alleged to have been involved in the Gürtel case. The company is involved in construction, energy, concessions and industrial services.

== Personal background ==
Delso was born in 1952 in Madrid, Spain. In 1983, he graduated from the Instituto Católico de Administración y Dirección de Empresas (ICADE) (Catholic Institute of Business Administration), where he studied Business Administration.

== Professional background ==
Heras started his professional career as a financial analyst and deputy director in Citibank. Subsequent work included working in the Banking Relations Department for national companies at the First National Bank of Chicago.

Heras has held several different positions following his graduation from ICADE, which include CEO of the Caja Postal de Ahorros; Managing General Director of Banco de Financiación Industrial; Banco de Comercio; and CEO of Transmediterránea.

=== Board memberships ===
Heras has served as a member of the Board of Directors of Telefónica, Limadet, Ghesa, Finan Postal, Unión Fenosa, Colonial and ARFI.
