= Tambacounda =

- City and commune
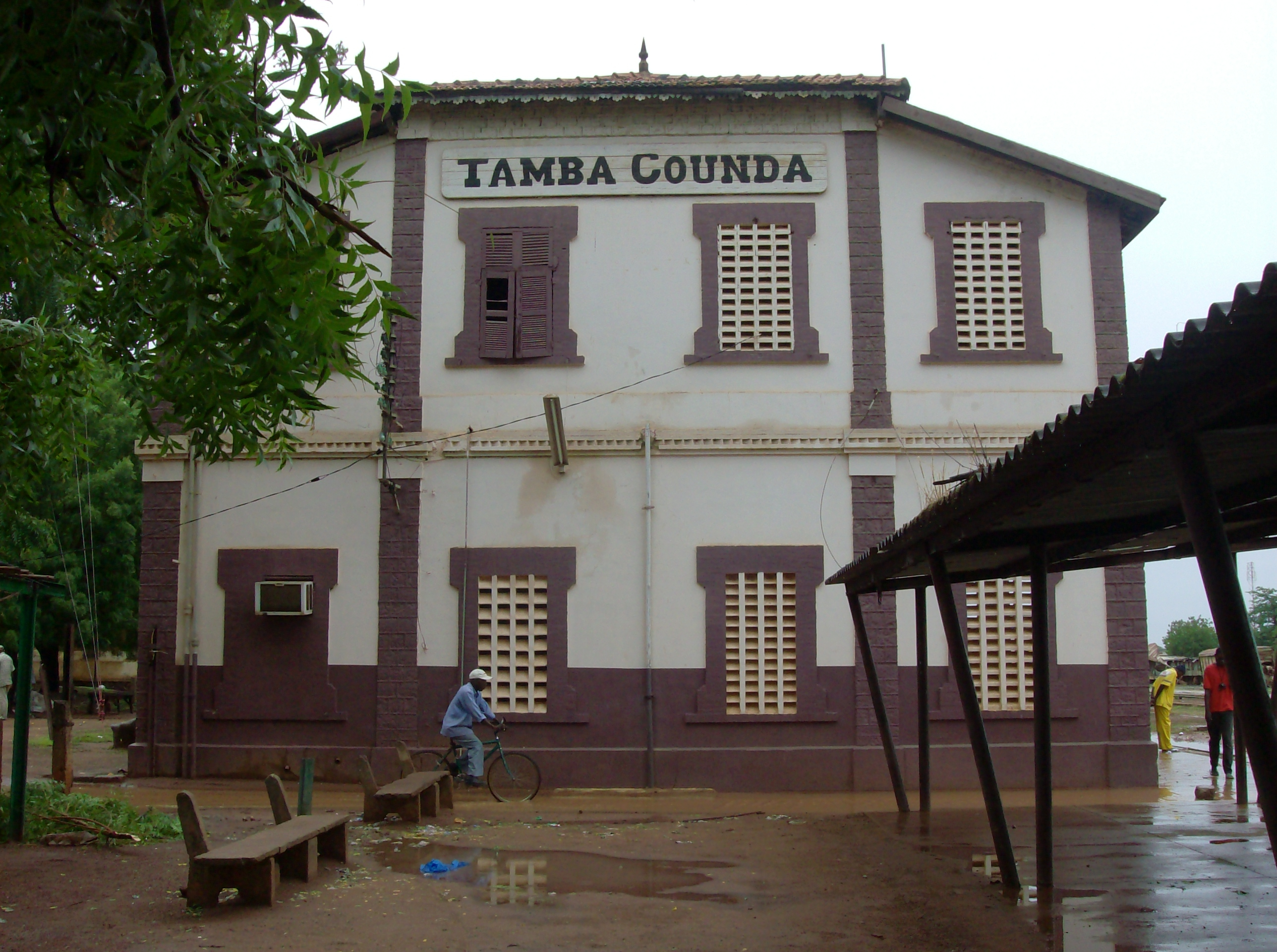
- Tambacounda train station

- Seal

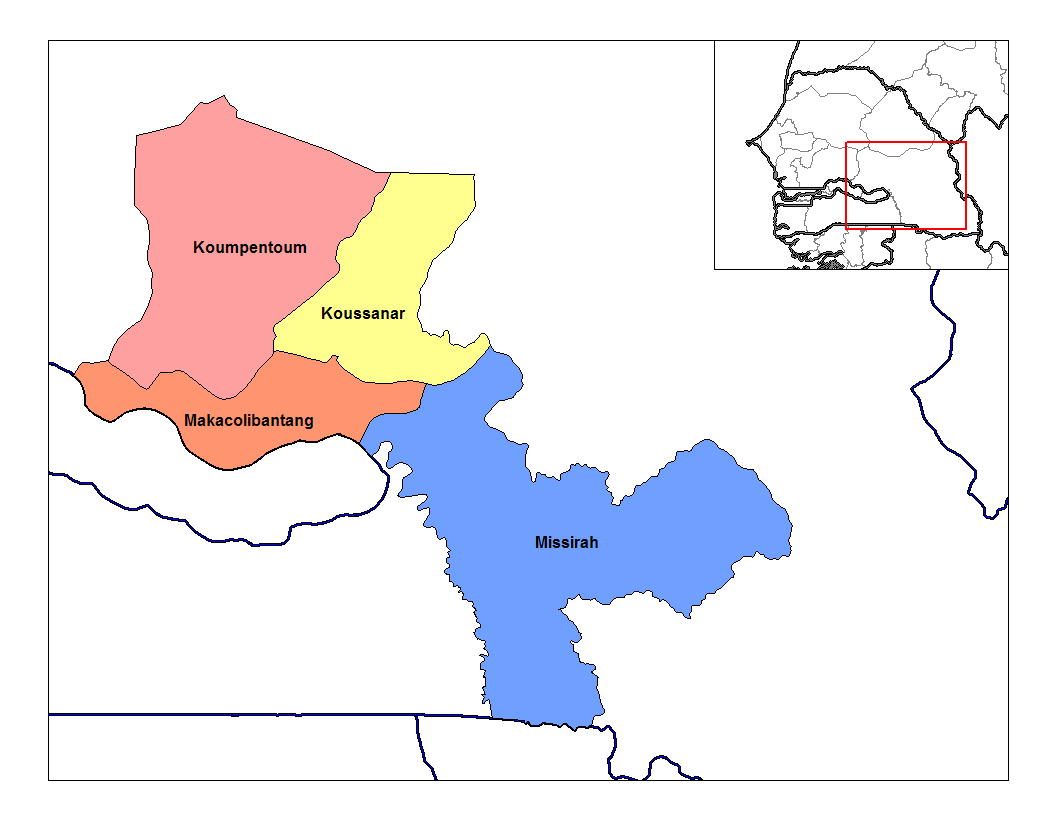
- Arrondissements of the Tambacounda department

- Location within Senegal
- Coordinates (region:SN_type:city): 13°46′8″N 13°40′2″W
- Country: Senegal
- Region: Tambacounda Region
- Departement: Tambacounda

Government
  - Mayor: Papa Banda Dièye

Area
  - City and commune: 57.05 km^{2} (22.03 sq mi)
- Elevation: 24 m (79 ft)

Population (2023 census)
  - City and commune: 149,071
  - Density: 2,613/km^{2} (6,768/sq mi)
- Time zone: UTC+0 (GMT)
- Website: communedetambacounda.sn

Tambacounda (Wolof: Tambaakundaa) is the largest city in eastern Senegal, 400 kilometres (250 mi) southeast of Dakar, and is the regional capital of the province of the same name. Its population in 2023 was 149,071.

== Geography ==
Tambacounda is situated on the sparsely populated sahel plains of eastern Senegal. Nearby towns include Madina Maboule, Koukari, Yoro Sankoule, Sambadian, Djidje Kounda, Afia Seno, Saare Boylii, and Kanderi Niana.

== Climate ==
Tambacounda has a tropical savanna climate. Like most of West Africa, the area has two seasons: a rainy season from June to October, characterized by heat, humidity, and storms, and a very hot dry season with little or no rain from November to May. The average annual precipitation is 887 mm (34.9 in).

Climate data for Tambacounda (1991–2020)
Month	Jan	Feb	Mar	Apr	May	Jun	Jul	Aug	Sep	Oct	Nov	Dec	Year
Mean daily maximum °C (°F)	34.9 (94.8)	37.4 (99.3)	39.8 (103.6)	41.4 (106.5)	40.9 (105.6)	37.6 (99.7)	33.6 (92.5)	32.2 (90.0)	33.0 (91.4)	35.9 (96.6)	37.5 (99.5)	35.6 (96.1)	36.6 (97.9)
Mean daily minimum °C (°F)	18.0 (64.4)	20.4 (68.7)	23.1 (73.6)	25.3 (77.5)	26.5 (79.7)	25.5 (77.9)	23.8 (74.8)	23.0 (73.4)	22.5 (72.5)	22.8 (73.0)	20.1 (68.2)	18.3 (64.9)	22.4 (72.3)
Average precipitation mm (inches)	0.1 (0.00)	0.1 (0.00)	0.2 (0.01)	0.1 (0.00)	13.2 (0.52)	82.6 (3.25)	163.0 (6.42)	226.7 (8.93)	199.3 (7.85)	54.3 (2.14)	2.6 (0.10)	0.0 (0.0)	742.2 (29.22)
Average precipitation days (≥ 1.0 mm)	0.0	0.1	0.1	0.1	1.1	5.9	10.6	14.8	12.9	4.3	0.3	0.0	50.2
Mean monthly sunshine hours	263.5	252.0	291.4	279.0	279.0	231.0	213.9	198.4	222.0	251.1	258.0	248.0	2,987.3
Mean daily sunshine hours	8.5	9.0	9.4	9.3	9.0	7.7	6.9	6.4	7.4	8.1	8.6	8.0	8.2
Source: NOAA (sun 1961-1990)

== History ==
Tambacounda was founded by Mandinka settlers of the Jatta (Diatta) family who had been driven out of the valley of the Faleme river by an expanding Bundu in the 18th century. When they arrived at the future side of Tambacounda they found a single hut, inhabited by a slave named Tamba, who welcomed them, and named the community after him. The town, a center of the peanut trade with the English, was attacked by Bundu in 1863.

The Kingdom of Wuli became a French protectorate in 1888. The Dakar–Bamako railway reached Tambacounda in 1913. In 1919, it became the administrative capital of a new eponymous cercle. With access to the railroad, in the 1920s came more intensive cultivation of grains, peanuts and cotton. French colonial authorities made the town a major transport hub, and a number of buildings, including the rail station retain the colonial flavor.

The train ran until 2018, when it was forced out of service due to a lack of maintenance of the rails. In January 2024, however, major upgrades were being done, with plans to relaunch passenger and freight service between Tambacounda and Dakar.

== Population and culture ==
Between the censuses of 1988 and 2002, Tambacounda grew from 41,885 to 67,543 inhabitants. In 2007, according to official estimates, the population reached 78,800 persons.

Settled first by Mandinka people, on the regular transhumance routes of Fula cattle herders, and settled again by Wolof farmers in the early 20th century, Tambacounda has a mix of most of the ethnic groups in Senegal.

The Tambacounda region is well known for its strong djembe drumming and dance traditions. In the mid-20th century, several of the most respected djembe masters from Segu, Mali came to Tambacounda, bringing with them their history, knowledge, and secrets of the djembe. Among the most notable musicians from Tambacounda was drummer Abdoulaye Diakité.

== Religion ==
According to Senegal's 1988 census, 96.3% of the population of the Tambacounda region was Muslim, while 2.4% was Christian. The Roman Catholic Diocese of Tambacounda also serves the area.

== Transport ==
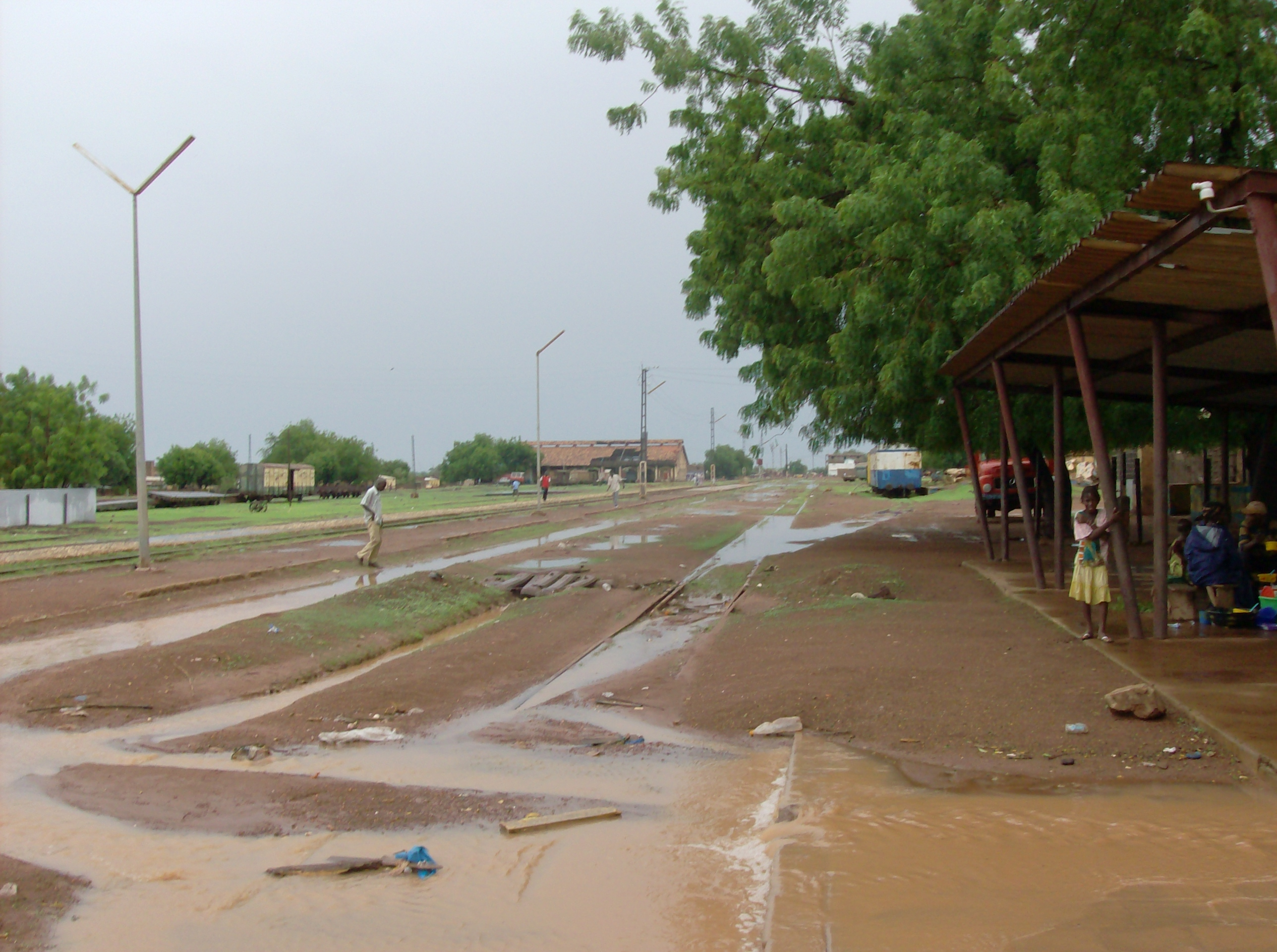
Train station, 2009

Besides the Dakar–Bamako railway, historically the city's major engine of growth, Tambacounda lies on the N1 and N7 roads. As a part of the Trans-Sahelian Highway system, these are critical for traffic going between the Kayes Region of Mali and the coastal regions of Sénégal (Dakar, Thiès, Saint-Louis), the most densely populated parts of both these nations. This east–west travel intersects with Senegal's most important route from Dakar to the Casamance region, which is cut off by Gambia. The road through Tambacounda is the only internal route between the two parts of the country that does not cross the Gambian border.

The town also has an airport, Tambacounda Airport, serviced by national and international flights.

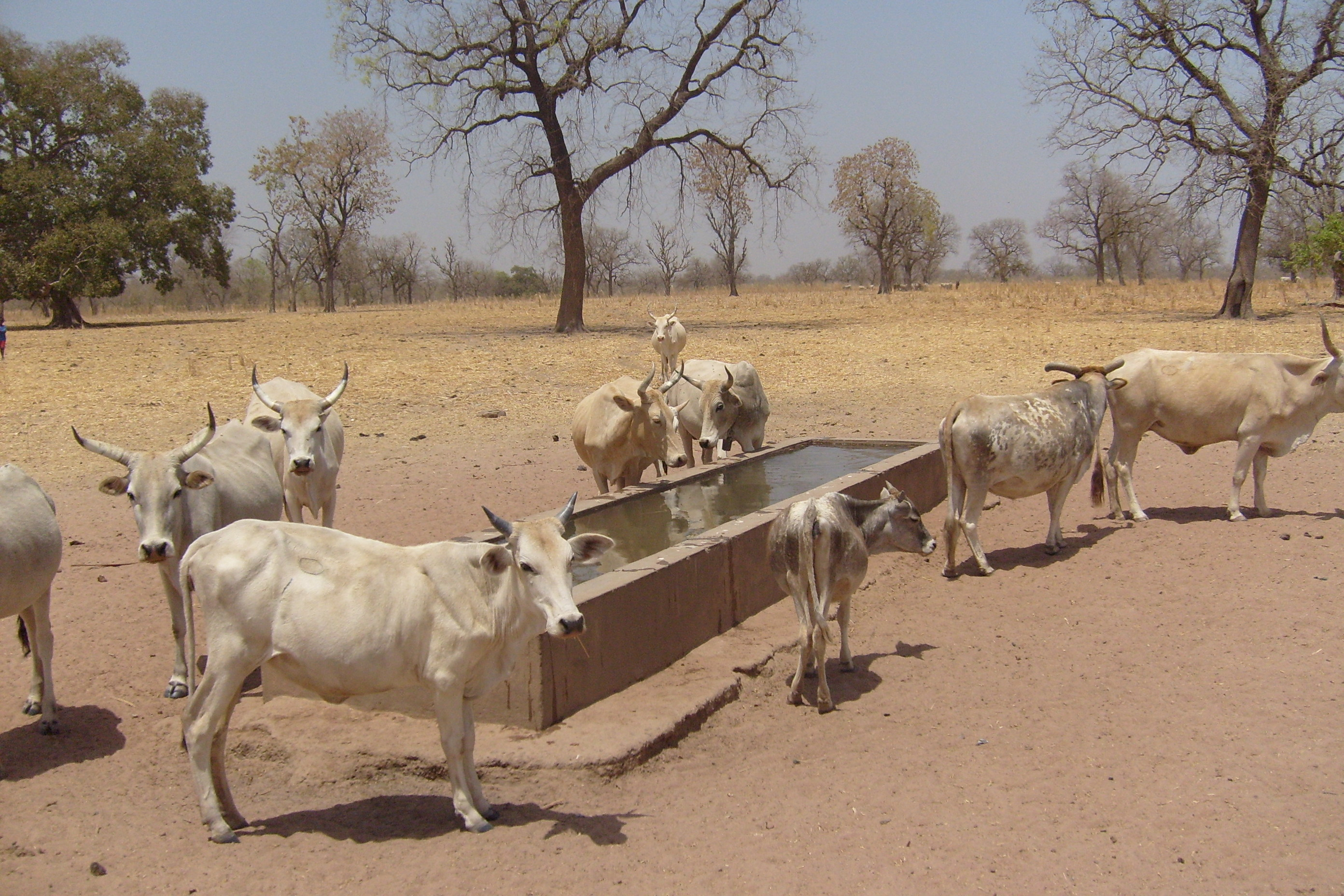
A farm near Tambacounda.

== Agriculture ==
Tambacounda is also a center for agricultural processing, with millet, sorghum, maize, and cotton grown in the dry plains of the region. Sodefitex operates a large cotton processing plant in the town.

== Administration ==
Tambacounda is the capital of both Tambacounda department and the Tambacounda region.

== Sites of interest ==
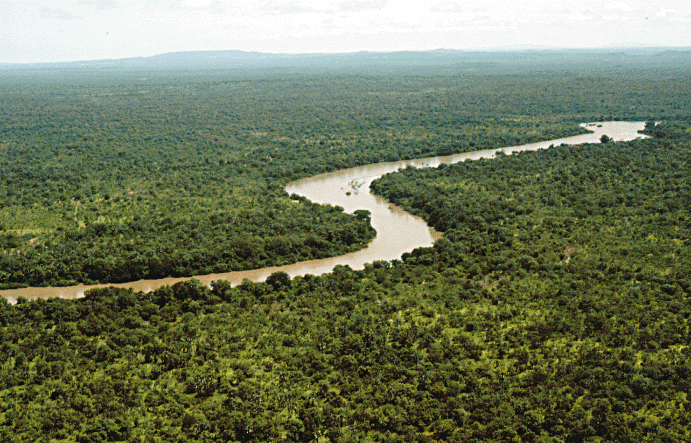
Niokolo-Koba National Park

Niokolo-Koba National Park lies just to the south of the town and is famed for its wildlife.

In 2003, the iron-framed rail station, the Hôtel de la Gare, and the colonial Préfecture building were placed on Senegal's list of Monuments historiques.

== Sister cities ==
- Bondy in France.
- La Roche-sur-Yon in France (local development project).
- Sint-Niklaas in Belgium since 2003.

== See also ==
- Dakar–Niger Railway
- Transport in Senegal
