= Bignona =

- Town and commune
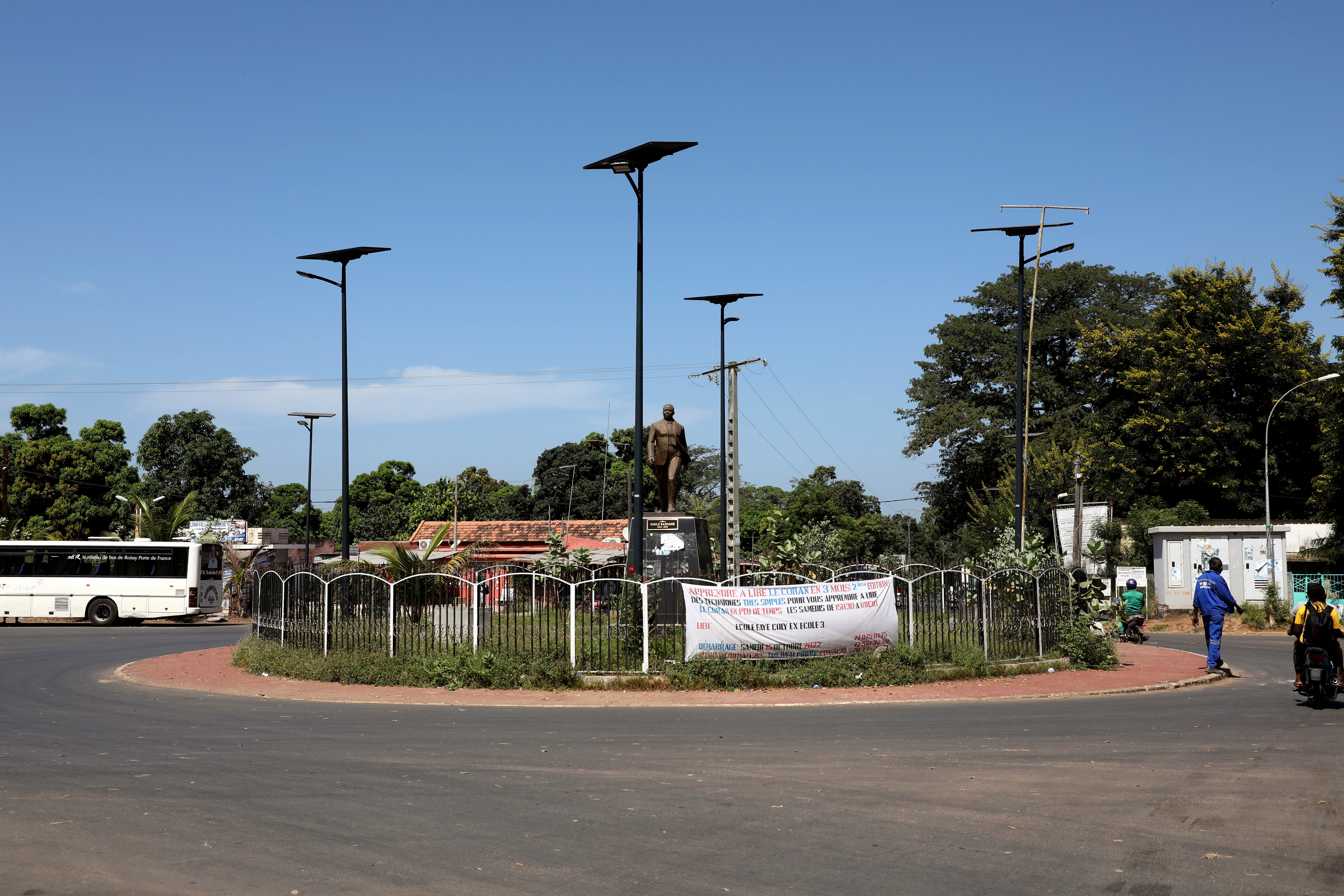
- Bignona, monument Emile Badiane

- Location within Senegal
- Coordinates: 12°49′N 16°14′W
- Country: Senegal
- Region: Ziguinchor
- Department: Bignona

Area
  - Town and commune: 16.88 km^{2} (6.52 sq mi)

Population (2023 census)
  - Town and commune: 28,642
  - Density: 1,697/km^{2} (4,395/sq mi)
- Time zone: UTC+0 (GMT)

Bignona is a town with commune status located in the Ziguinchor Region of Senegal (Casamance). It briefly appears in the 2004 Spanish movie Binta and the Great Idea.

Its population in 2023 was 28,642.

== Notable people ==
- Landing Savané, politician
- Ibrahima Sonko, footballer
- Moussa Wague, footballer
- Lamine Diarra, footballer
- Séni Camara, sculptor
- Augustin Sagna, Roman Catholic prelate

== National roads ==
- The N4, running north to Kaolack via Bounkiling and Gambia (Trans-Gambia Highway) and south to Ziguinchor.
- The N5, running north to Kaolack via Banjul, (capital of Gambia).
