= Sokone =

- Town
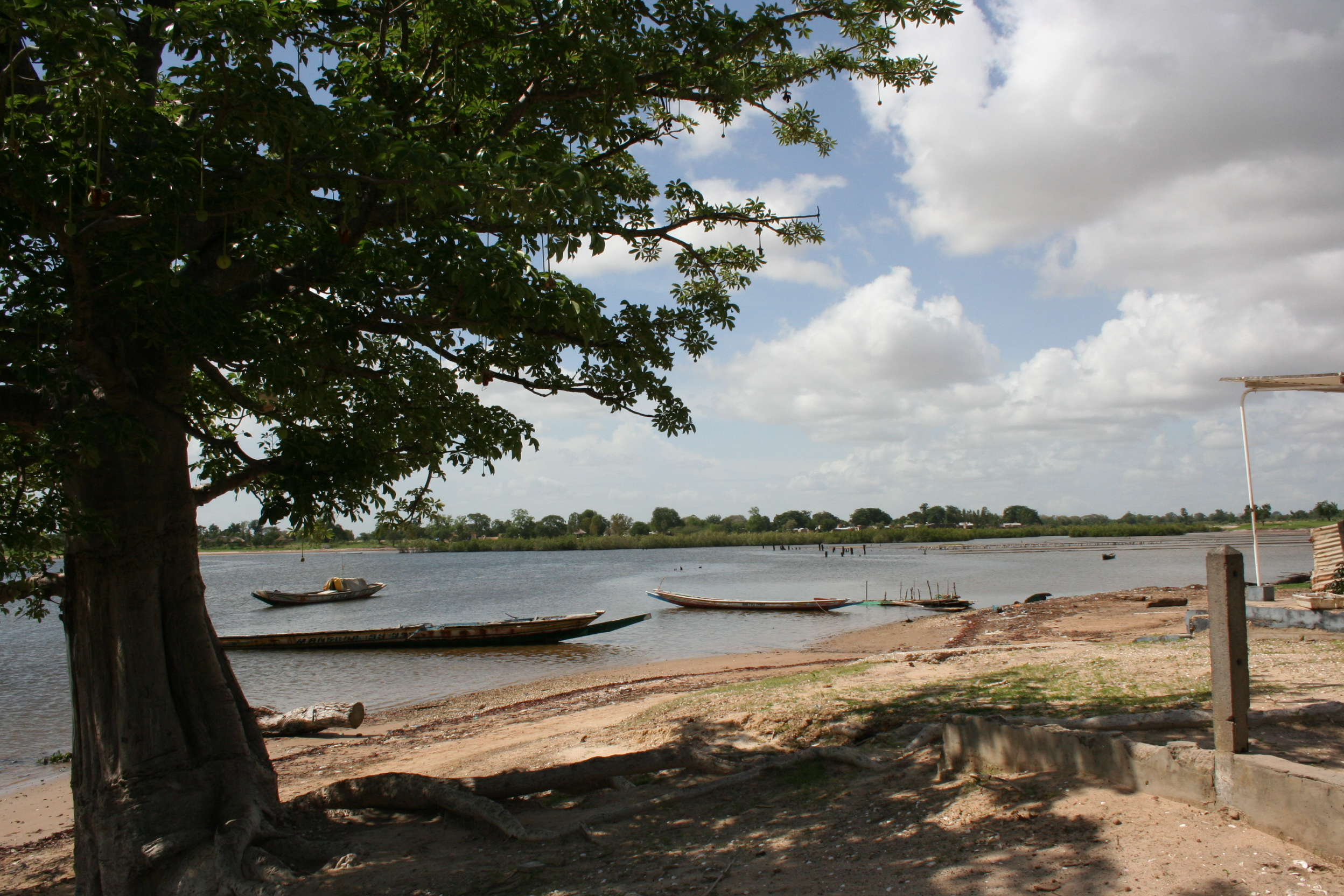
- Bay at Sokone

- Location in Senegal
- Coordinates: 13°53′N 16°22′W
- Country: Senegal
- Region: Fatick Region
- Department: Foundiougne

Population (2013)
  - Total: 14,500
- Time zone: UTC+0 (GMT)

Sokone is a town in the Fatick Region of central Senegal.

Sokone is a tranquil town on the south-eastern Sine-Saloum Delta amid the mangroves. It is located on the N5 road from Kaolack to Banjul, 50 km south of Kaolack and 66 km north of Banjul. During the colonial period, the town was a peanut port and the old warehouses can still be seen around town along with a large number of peanut fields in the surrounding country side. Along with peanuts, millet, cashews, and many fruits and vegetables are grown. Agriculture and fishing continue to be the main economic activities in the area.

The main ethnic group in the area is the Sereer people, followed by the Wolof, Pulaars, and Mandinkas. The Wolof and Sereer languages are the most commonly heard languages, but many people in the town speak French as well.

In 2013, according to official estimates, Sokone had a population of some 14,500.

== History ==
As of the 20th century, the area where Sokone meaning inside the house in Mandinka Language is located, specifically the extensive southwestern part of the Salum Delta, was densely populated. A process of migration from the Rip Region. The Mandinkas were the main settlers in this region, and this process continued into the late 1970s, when the Mandinkas were joined by different ethnic groups such as the Wolof, Fulani, Sereer and Sarakollés.
