= State shapes =

Type of boundary shapes for a state

The shape of a state is determined by the political boundaries and geography that determine its territory, and that shape impacts the politics and economies of the state. The six categories of state shapes are: compact; elongated or attenuated; fragmented; prorupted or protruded; perforated; and compound or complex.

In a compact state, the distance from the center of the state to any boundary does not vary significantly. According to Derwent Whittlesey, a Harvard professor (1939), the ideal state should be compact ("chunky") rather than elongated. Poland is an example of a compact state. A compact state has a minimum frontier to defend, and generally roads and railways are relatively simple to provide.

An elongated or attenuated state is much longer in one direction than the other. Norway and Chile are examples of elongated states. Defense and transportation can be more difficult in an elongated state.

A fragmented state has several noncontiguous pieces of territory. Archipelagos such as Philippines, Indonesia, and Fiji are examples of fragmented states.

A prorupted or protruded has an extension that protrudes from the main territory. Thailand is an example of a prorupted state.

A perforated completely surrounds another state (country). South Africa is an example of a perforated state because it surrounds Lesotho.

Compound or complex refers to states that have characteristics of multiple categories. For example, the Contiguous United States is compact, but the United States of America which includes Alaska and Hawaii is fragmented.

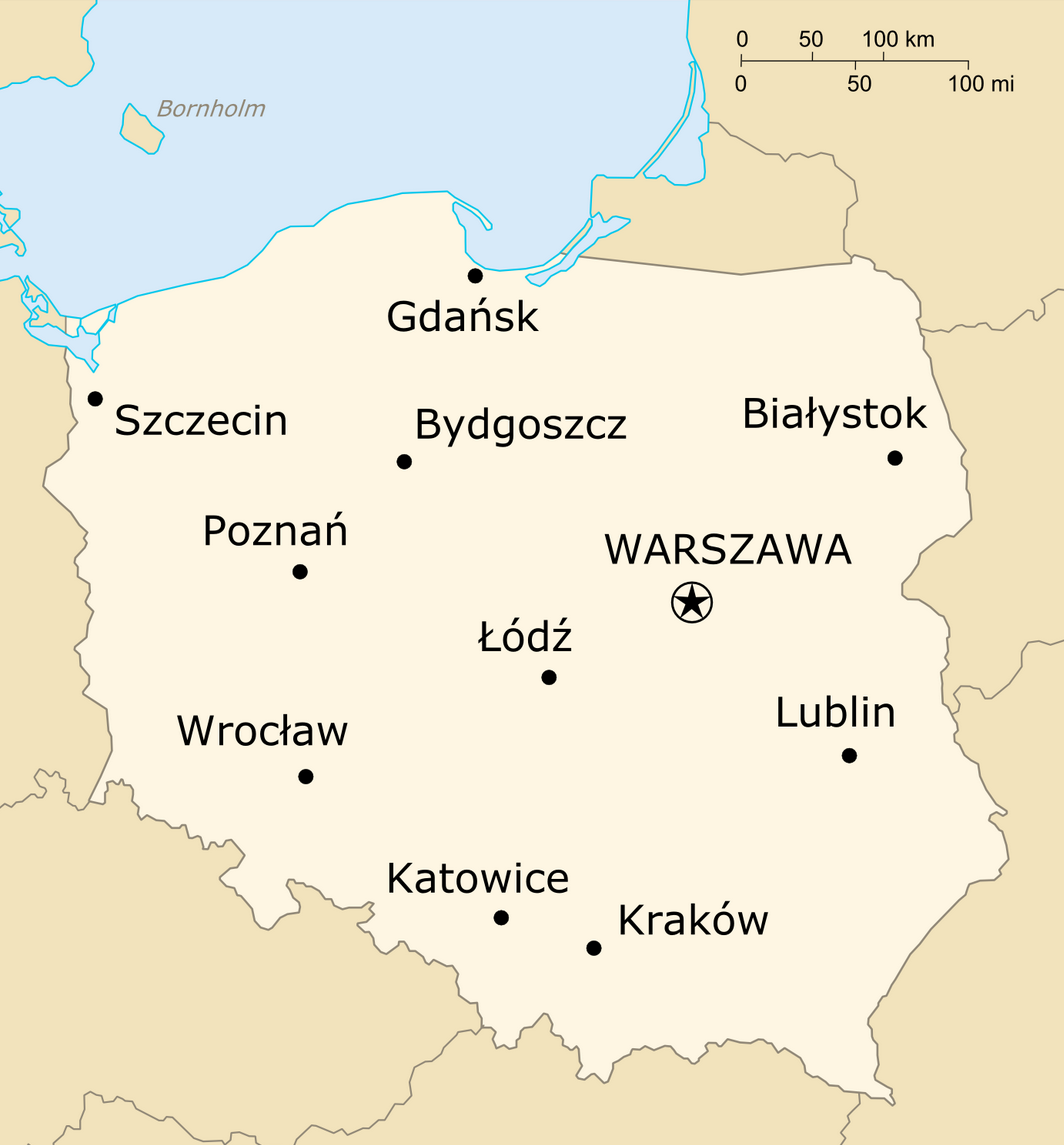
Compact (Poland)

Elongated (Chile)

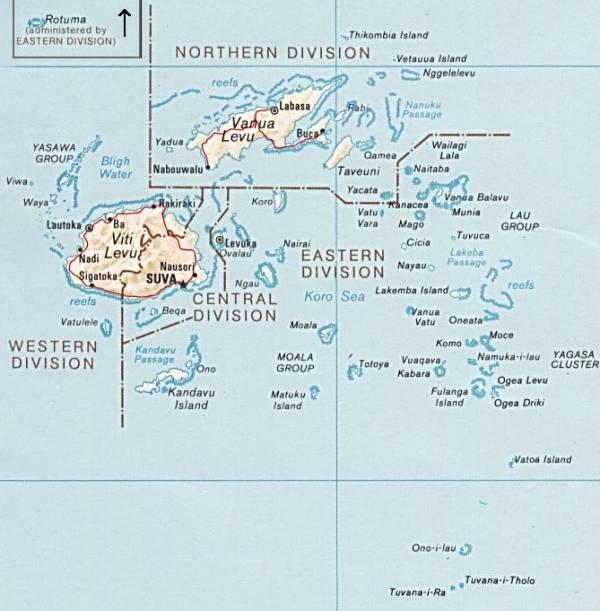
Fragmented (Fiji)

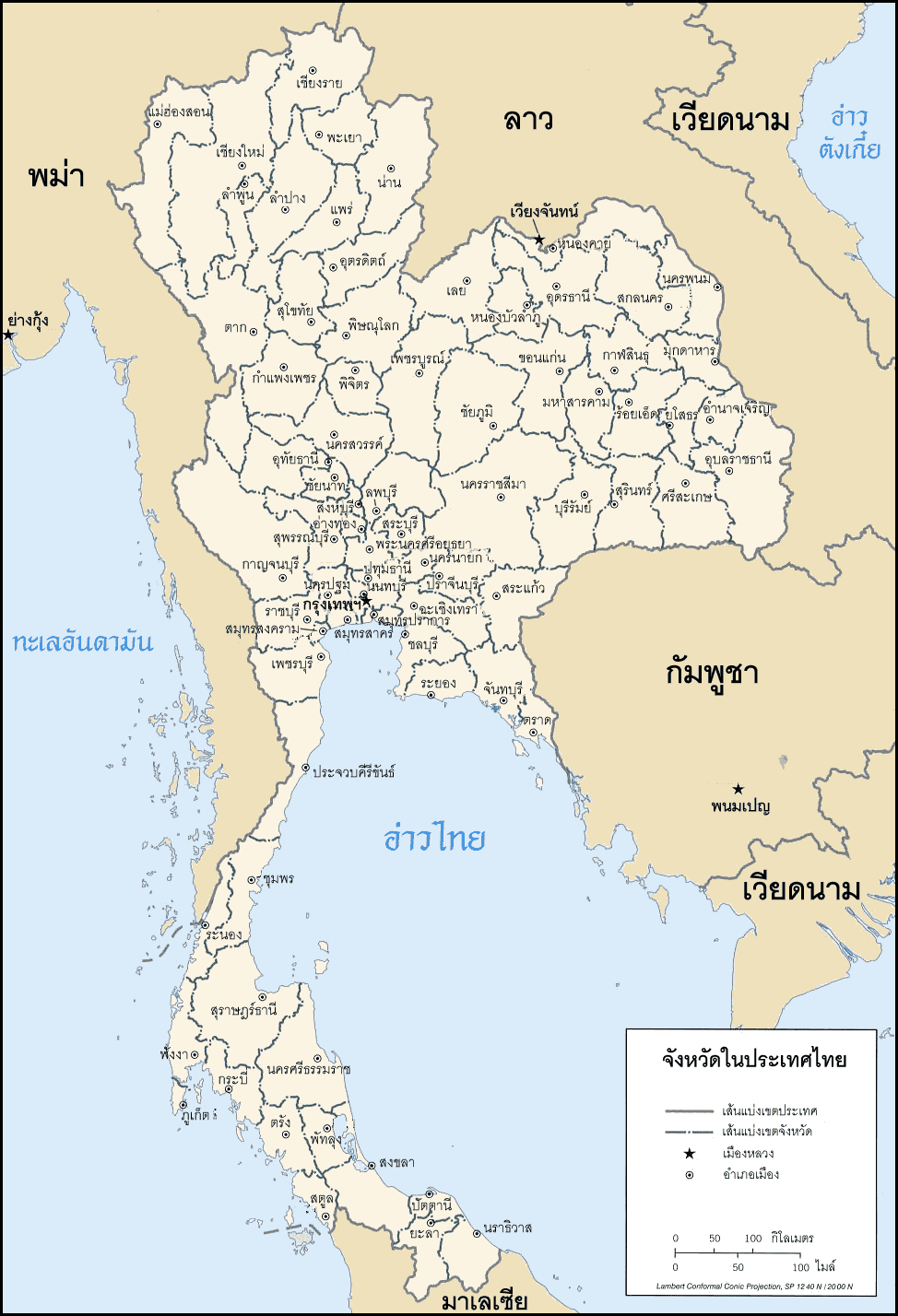
Prorupted (Thailand)

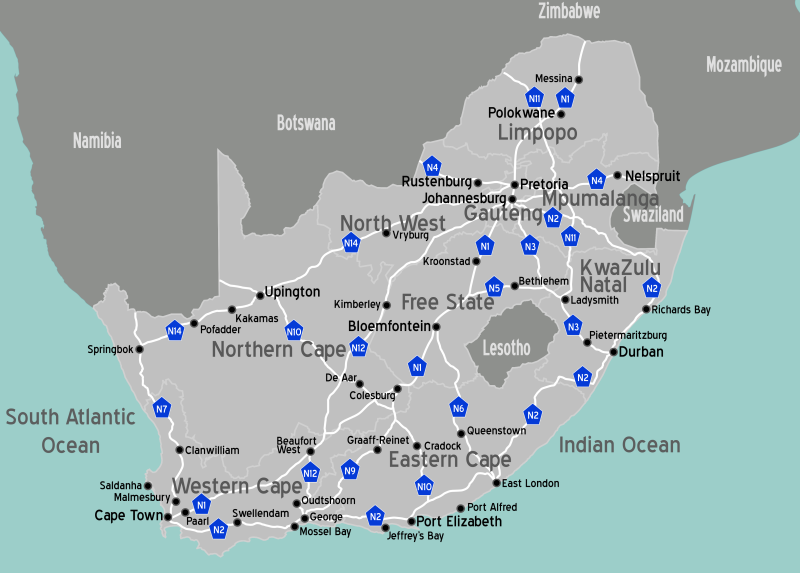
Perforated (South Africa)
