= Nayé, Senegal =

Town in Senegal

Coordinates: 14°25′00″N 12°12′00″W

Nayé
- Elevation: 37 m (121 ft)

Population
  - Total: 347

Nayé (or Nayes) is a town in the Bakel department of the Tambacounda region within Senegal, on the border with Mali. It is situated approximately 4.6 kilometres (2.8 miles) south of Kidira.

== History ==
According to oral traditions, the town's history dates back to over 500 years. The current village chief is Boubou Ka.

== Transport ==
It is served by a station on the Dakar-Niger Railway.

== See also ==
- Railway stations in Senegal
- Railway stations in Mali
