= Ouro Sogui =

- Town
- Location within Senegal
- Coordinates: 15°36′N 13°19′W
- Country: Senegal
- Region: Matam
- Department: Matam

Population (2023 census)
  - Total: 27,222
- Time zone: UTC+0 (GMT)

Ouro Sogui or Ourossogui lies in Matam Region in eastern Senegal on the N2 and N3 roads, just south west of Matam on the River Senegal. It is an important market town and transport hub.

In the census of 2002, Ourossogui had a population 13,177. In the 2023 census the population had grown to 27,222.
