= Farafenni =

Town in North Bank Division, The Gambia

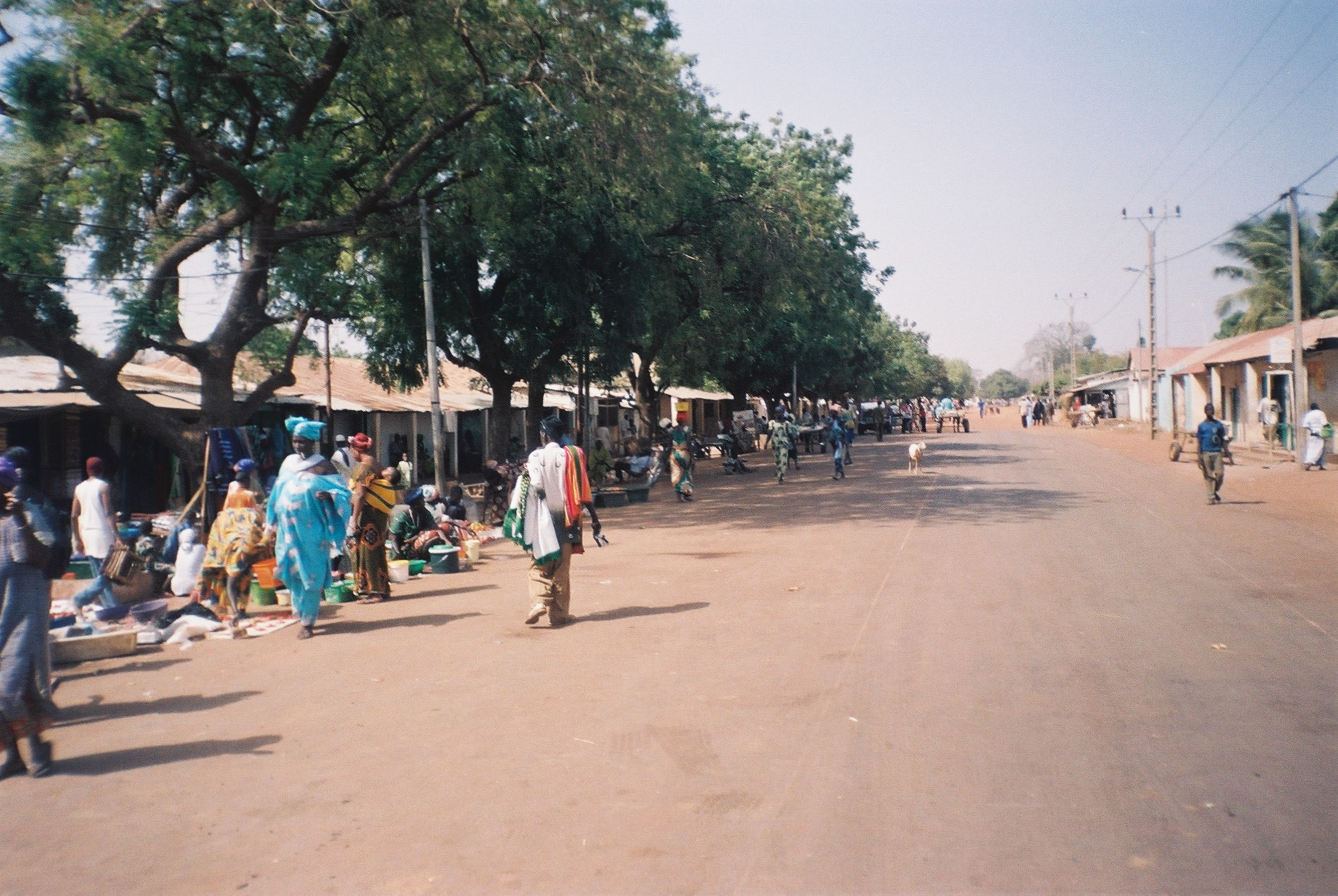
- The main street in Farafenni

- Location in the Gambia
- Coordinates: 13°34′N 15°36′W
- Country: The Gambia
- Division: North Bank Division

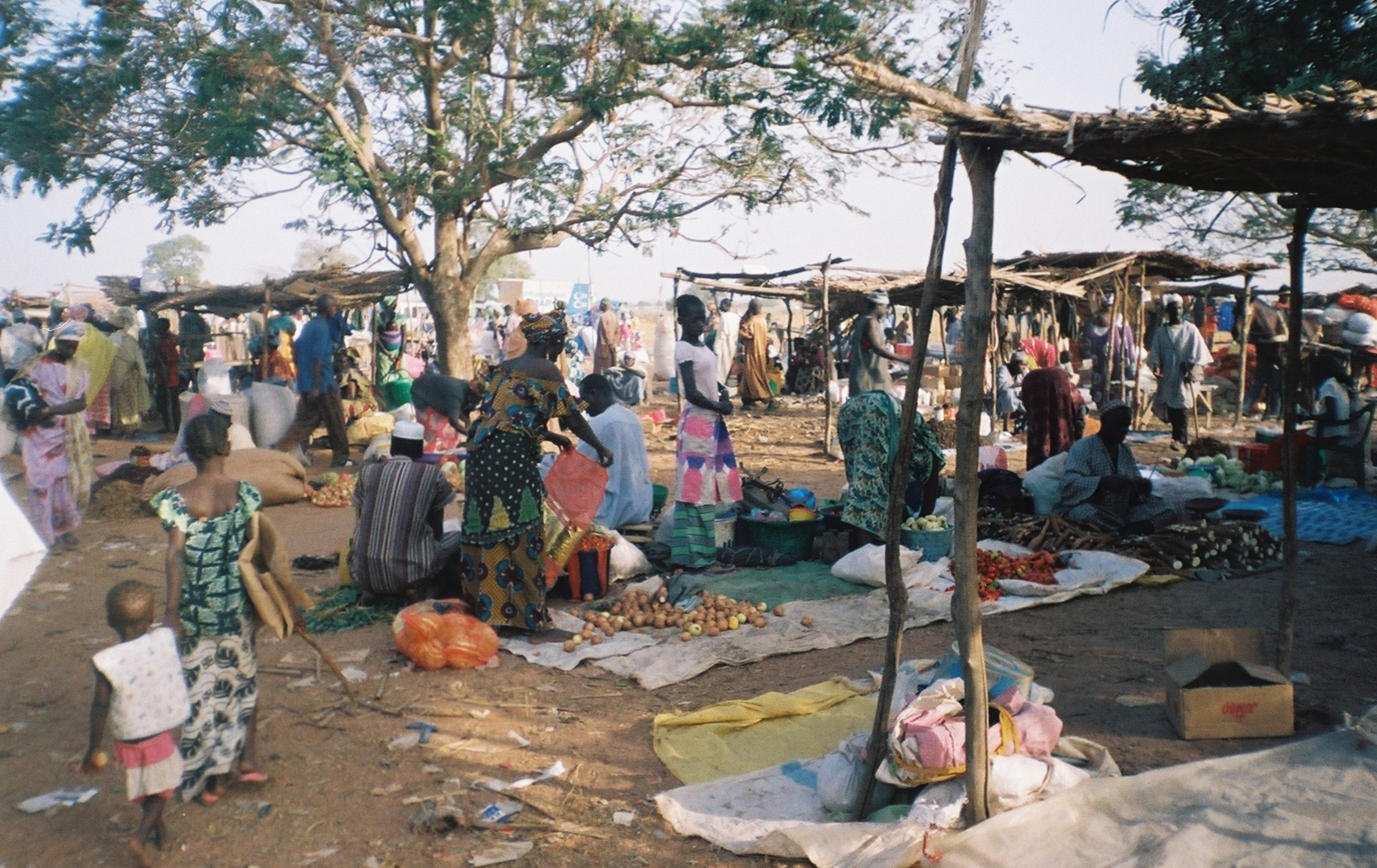
The lumo in Farafenni

Farafenni or Farafegni sometimes called Chakubanta or Faracity is a town in the Gambia, lying on the Trans-Gambia Highway in the North Bank Division, just south of the border with Senegal. It is an important market town.

The population of Farafenni is around 25,000 and the main local language is Wolof, although Mandinka, Fula and other languages are also fairly common.

== Infrastructure and services ==
Farafenni is the site of a recently built hospital and also contains a military base which was attacked in 1995 by six men later claiming to be Sanyang's collaborators.

There is only one senior secondary school, called: Farafenni Senior Secondary School; two junior Secondary: Farafenni Junior Secondary School, and Anglican Junior Secondary School. Both located in the Outskirts of the town; and two primary Schools, namely: Farafenni Lower Basic School, and Mauritani Lower Basic School. Farafenni Upper Basic School is sponsored by John Cabot Academy in Bristol, UK.

== Economy and trade ==
Farafenni is a commercial town, where transactions are carried out in various commercial sectors. Farafenni’s economy is supported by several trading centers spread throughout the town. The main marketplace located in the centre of the town, acts as a commercial hub for a variety of goods. On Sundays, the town hosts its weekly lumo a lively open-air market held on the outskirts of the town. The lumo attract both local and cross-border traders.

Farafenni is at the northern end of the segment of the Trans-Gambia Highway containing the Senegambia Bridge.

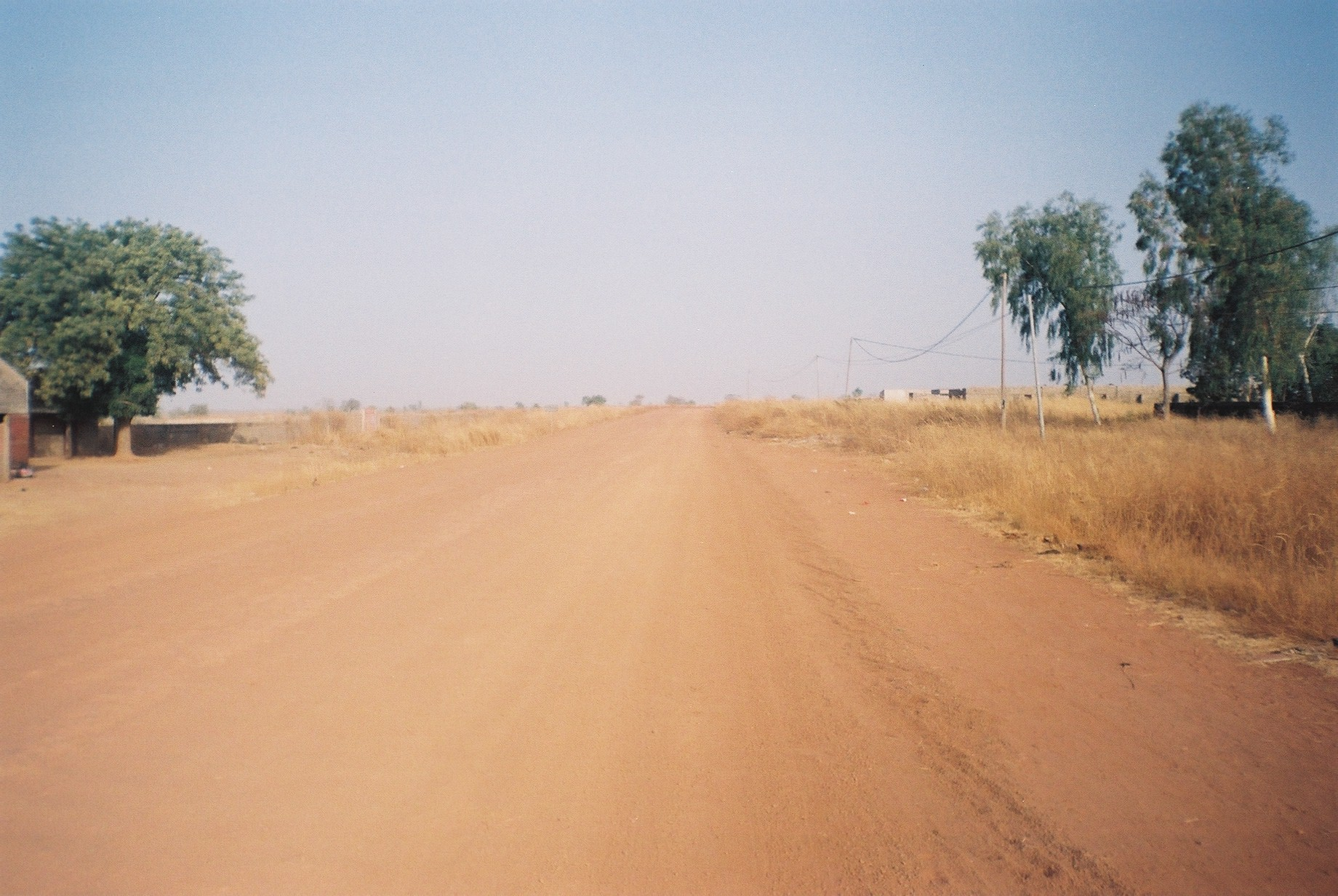
The Trans-Gambia highway
