= List of rivers of Senegal =

This is a list of rivers in Senegal. This list is arranged by drainage basin, with respective tributaries indented under each larger stream's name.

== Atlantic Ocean ==
- Sénégal River
  - Falémé River
  - Vallée du Ferlo
    - Tiângol Lougguéré
    - Vallée de Mboune
  - Branches:
    - Doué River
    - Dioulol
- Saloum River
  - Sine River
  - Diombos River
- Gambia River
  - Sandougou River
  - Koulountou River
  - Niéri Ko
    - Mayél Samou
  - Niokolo Koba
- Geba River (Kayanga River)
- Casamance River
  - Cool River
