= Agnam Civol =

Coordinates: 16°0′18″N 13°41′35″W

- Village
- Interactive map of Agnam Civol
- Country: Senegal
- Region: Matam
- Department: Matam
- Arrondissement: Agnam Civol

Population (2011)
  - Total: 3,333
- Time zone: UTC+0 (GMT)

Agnam Civol (also Anyam Siwol or Civol ) is a small town in the north-east of Senegal about 70 km north-west from Matam. It is in the historical region of Fouta-Toro in the department and region of Matam. The town is located on Highway N2 some 300 km east of Saint Louis. It is some 5 km south of the border with Mauretania, which generally follows the course of the Senegal River.

== Geography ==
The town of Agnam Civol, the capital of the sub-prefecture and the rural community, is bounded on the north by the Walo fields, a flood zone of the Senegal River. In the south are the fields of Diéri, a cropping area for Millet, Sorghum, and cowpeas. To the east is the town of Agnam Godo and to the west is the village of Agnam Sinthiou Ciré Mato, land of the Almamy. It is about 7 km north-west of the former district capital Thilogne and 70 km north-west from the capital of the department and region, Matam.

The population of Agnam Civol lives on agriculture, livestock, handicrafts, trade, and remittances from emigres in other countries. The currency is the CFA franc.

The village has a sub-prefecture, a community hall, a kindergarten, and an elementary school but with few resources, a full-service post office, an old and dilapidated drilling site from 1981, a dispensary, and a poorly equipped maternity clinic. There is a social centre for research sources of funds for equipment and a college 3 km away in a neighbouring village.

=== Climate ===
There are two seasons:

- a dry season (October–June)
- a rainy season (June–October)

Climate data for Matam
Month	Jan	Feb	Mar	Apr	May	Jun	Jul	Aug	Sep	Oct	Nov	Dec	Year
Mean daily maximum °C (°F)	32.8 (91.0)	36.0 (96.8)	39.1 (102.4)	41.6 (106.9)	42.8 (109.0)	40.4 (104.7)	36.8 (98.2)	34.8 (94.6)	35.1 (95.2)	38.0 (100.4)	37.0 (98.6)	33.2 (91.8)	37.3 (99.1)
Mean daily minimum °C (°F)	15.5 (59.9)	17.6 (63.7)	20.5 (68.9)	23.6 (74.5)	26.8 (80.2)	27.3 (81.1)	25.7 (78.3)	24.9 (76.8)	24.7 (76.5)	24.3 (75.7)	20.1 (68.2)	16.3 (61.3)	22.3 (72.1)
Average precipitation mm (inches)	0.2 (0.01)	1.3 (0.05)	0.1 (0.00)	1.3 (0.05)	1.0 (0.04)	25.1 (0.99)	85.2 (3.35)	133.4 (5.25)	94.6 (3.72)	21.1 (0.83)	2.5 (0.10)	1.0 (0.04)	30.57 (1.20)
Source: NOAA Station ID: SG61630, Latitude: 15°39'N, Longitude: 013°15'W, Elevation: 17m

=== Relief, Soil, and Vegetation ===
The relief of the rural community is rugged with three ecological zones running north to south from the Senegal River.

The Waalo

This is the area south of the Senegal River or "Dandémayo" in Fulani has an area of some 119 square kilometres or 17% of the total rural community.

Within the Waalo area there are three types of soil: the Hollalde, Faalo, and Fonde.

The Hollalde is characterised by a flat typography and with soil of 60% clay. This is the best area for crops.

The Faalo is flat with sandy textured soil along flooded riverbanks.

The Fonde has less than 40% clay in the soil and is less productive as it is flooded less frequently.

The Lower Diery

This is the intermediate zone between the Waalo and the Diery with an area of 16 square kilometres running along the Highway N2 with an average width of 2 km. Some of the area has been allocated for residential housing.

The Diery.

This is the largest area in the south of the community with 584 square kilometres or 81% of the total area.

Topography is undulating and receives some 400 mm of rain per year. Generally the land is poor and sandy with increasing degradation due to wind and water.

=== Underground water resources ===
The most important water is in the Maastrichtian sands. Its depth varies from 50 metres in the north to 250 metres in the south and provides relatively safe water resources.

=== The Creation of the Town and origin of the name ===
The town has existed since the 12th century. The name Civol comes from Civoyla, the name of a mountain in Saudi Arabia where the first settlers in the village came from. The Ka, the first settlers' priests, assumed the role of village chief.

The population of Civol was at first living at Kadiel-Baytillaye, a hill south of the present village for over 365 years. Then, for more than a century, at Winndé Civoyla, at the bottom of the same hill, before living permanently at Civol's current location.

Agnam comes from "ar gnam" in Fulani which means "come and eat". The area is known as a regional trading post and is very welcoming. This name of Agnam that precedes a dozen village names in the region was given by foreigners staying there.

== Founders and heads of village ==
Boucar Yetty and Ndiobbo Yetty descendants of Yetty Koubata from Arabia and, mixed with the Fulani people of Djolof, were the founders of Civol. The oldest man of the founding family, the Ka, was appointed Village Chief. For nearly 300 years, the Village Chief was elected democratically by the people, but always from the Ka.

Abdoul Cissé Kâ was the first to bear the title of Village Chief. The name is preceded by the title "Thierno Civol" (Village Chief Civol). Since then, 28 Village Chiefs followed, including the current Thierno Civol Abdoul Samba Ka.

Village Chiefs are appointed for life. In case of resignation or death, the family of Touré, cousins of the Ka, provides an interim Chief until the next election. This title is called "Thierno Wothy".

== Administration ==
Agnam Civol was set up as a rural community (communauté rurale) in 1972 by bringing together more than twenty villages. Previously these villages had formed a traditional community under the name Agnam that almost all of these villages share. Thus, as member villages there were Agnam Thiodaye the largest demographically, Agnam Wouro Ciré, Agnam-Goly, Agnam Godo, Agnam Lidoubé, Agnam Civol, Agnam Toulel Thiallé etc. The community has grown thanks to its strategic position located on National Highway N2 and as a hinge between two ecological zones, the Diéri and the Walo.

The other villages in the rural community are:

- Agnam-Goly
- Agnam Godo
- Agnam Balanabe
- Agnam Lidoubé
- Ouro Molo
- Agnam Thiodaye
- Agnam Toulel Thiallé
- Agnam Yéroyabé
- Kangal
- Mbellabélé
- Mberlaberlé
- Ndiaffane Belthindy
- Ndiaffane Sorokoum
- Sinthiou Boumacka
- Sinthiou Cire Matou
- Walo Sylla Worgo

The implementation of several facilities, the development of trade and the contribution of migrants have contributed to its development under the demographic plan, both economic and cultural.

=== Successive Village chiefs ===
Thierno Civol (title before the name):

- Abdoul Cisse ka
- Demba Oumou Ka
- Falil Ka
- Bassirou Ka
- Baïdal Ka
- Cisse Mama Ka
- Malick Dialo Ka
- Abdul Baïdal Ka
- Mamoudou Thillo Ka
- Samba Baïdy Ka
- Abdoulaye Kadiata Ka
- Demba Doro Ka
- Abdul Samba Ka (current)

=== Successive Interim Village Chiefs ===
Thierno Wothy (title before the name):

- Samba Boubou Touré
- Oumar Alpha Touré
- Mamadou Billo Touré
- Hamath Sambâ Adama Touré
- Cissé Samba Boubou Touré
- Demba Samba Boubou Touré
- Demba Boudel Touré

== Population ==
The region, comprising 16 villages preceded by the word "Agnam", is estimated to number more than 26,000 inhabitants, to which must be added the population of the Walo area (the edge of the Senegal River) which has over 5,000 inhabitants.

The population is very young (60% under 20 years and 32% between 20 and 54 years). The ethnic Fulani are a very large majority (99.5%). Only a few traders have established in the commercial sectors, mainly in building or clothing.

== Economy ==
The main economic activities are agriculture, livestock, fishing and small business.

During the rainy season, the main crops of millet, sorghum, beans, and watermelon are found in the Diéri area. During the dry season maize, millet, beans, watermelons, sweet potatoes etc. are available at Walo.

For 40 years, people's survival depended heavily on remittances from family members who have emigrated abroad or who are in major cities of Senegal.

Women as a rule stay in the village to raise the children because their husbands have left in search of work: they also live on small business, market gardening, and food crops.

== Culture and religion ==
The area has four major mosques located to the west of Oréfondé, in the centre of Civol, at Thilogne, and to the east of Kobilo.

The Great Mosque of Civol-Haada is 500 years old. It gave its name to a district of Civol: Haada. It was directed by Elimane Ndiaye Gnawa and was celebrated by the Almamy of Fouta Abdul Kader Kane. Agnam Civol has had a Koranic Arabic school for nearly five centuries.

=== Imams of the mosque ===
Elimane (title before the name):

- Ndiaye Gnawa
- Haby Ka
- Moussa Ka
- Amadou Baaba Ba
- Hassane Ba
- Sadou Ka
- Oumar Alpha Touré
- Mamadou Niandou Ka
- Ibrahima Ba who assumes the role during his vacation at Civol
- Abu Mamadou Ndiaye Ka
- Musa Isma Ka

== Districts, streets, and squares ==
Districts

- Touldénaabé
- Thiorinkoobé
- Diabanaabé
- Seck Seckbé
- Gallé Samba
- Ndiadembé
- Tourenbé

Public squares (digueeré Civol in Fulani)

- Selly Touldénaabé
- Lowel Sylla
- Gidda Gallou Walo
- Thioyrinkoobé
- Bayla
- Ndiaye Bellawol
- Haada
- Diabanabé
- Touldénaabé
- Diouma

== Twinning and partnerships ==
Agnam Civol has been twinned with the town of

- Vouziers (France) since 1990.
  - The Friendship Association Vouziers Civol, whose president is Elizabeth Durtette has existed since 1986, with construction of the primary school, the maternity clinic, and the community centre.
- Partnership with Agnam Sinthiou Ciré Mato
  - Sinthiou Ciré is a village of 900 inhabitants in the north-east of Civol. Civol and Sinthiou Ciré share the same associations and the same objectives. Only the origins and the Village Chief are different.

== Notable People born in Agnam Civol ==
Abdul Aziz Kane was one of the founders of the cooperation agreement between Vouziers and Civol. He has been the president of the rural council of Agnam-Civol for more than 10 years.

== See also ==
- Outline of Senegal

== Bibliography ==
- (in French) Oumar Kane, La première hégémonie peule : le Fuuta Tooro de Koli Teŋella à Almaami Abdul, Karthala, Presses universitaires de Dakar, 2004, 672 pages. ISBN 978-2-84586-521-1
