= Ourossogui Arrondissement =

Ourossogui
- Arrondissement
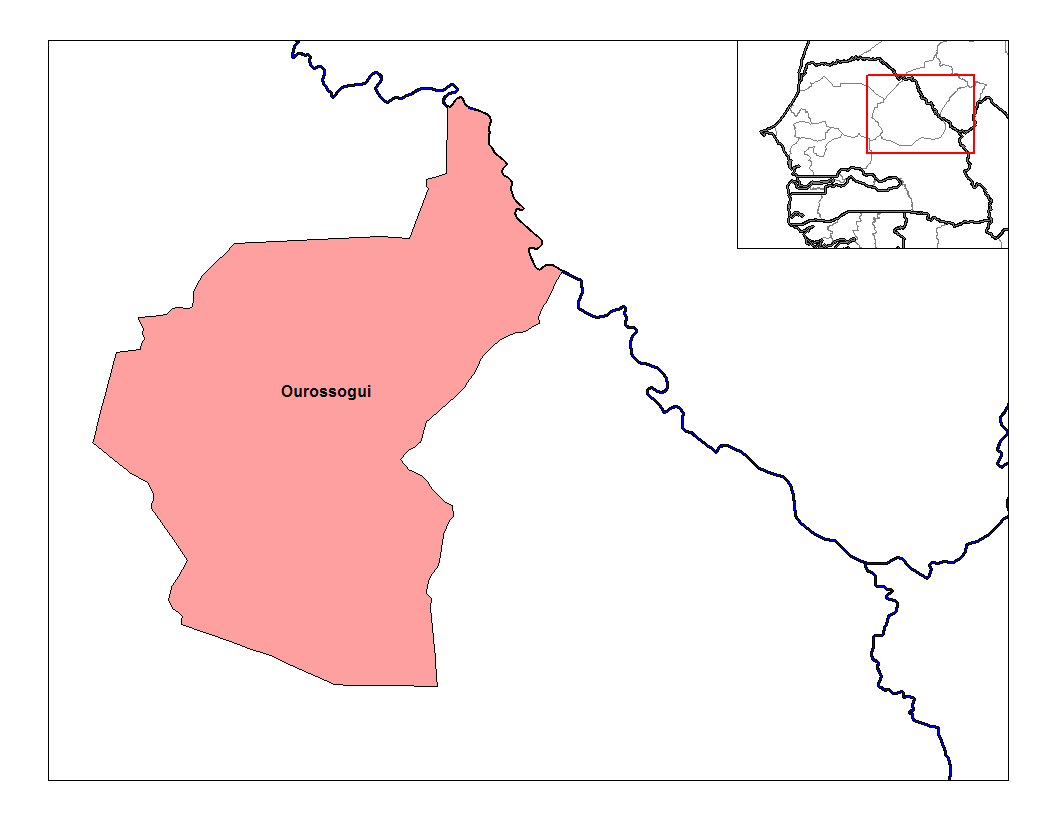
- Country: Senegal
- Region: Matam Region

Government
  - Mayor: Moussa Bocar Thiam

Population (2005)
  - Total: 15,614
- Time zone: UTC±00:00 (GMT)

Ourossogui is an arrondissement of the Matam Department in the Matam Region of Senegal.

== Subdivisions ==
The arrondissement is divided administratively into rural communities and in turn into villages.
