= Agnam-Goly =

Agnam-Goly Aañam-Goli
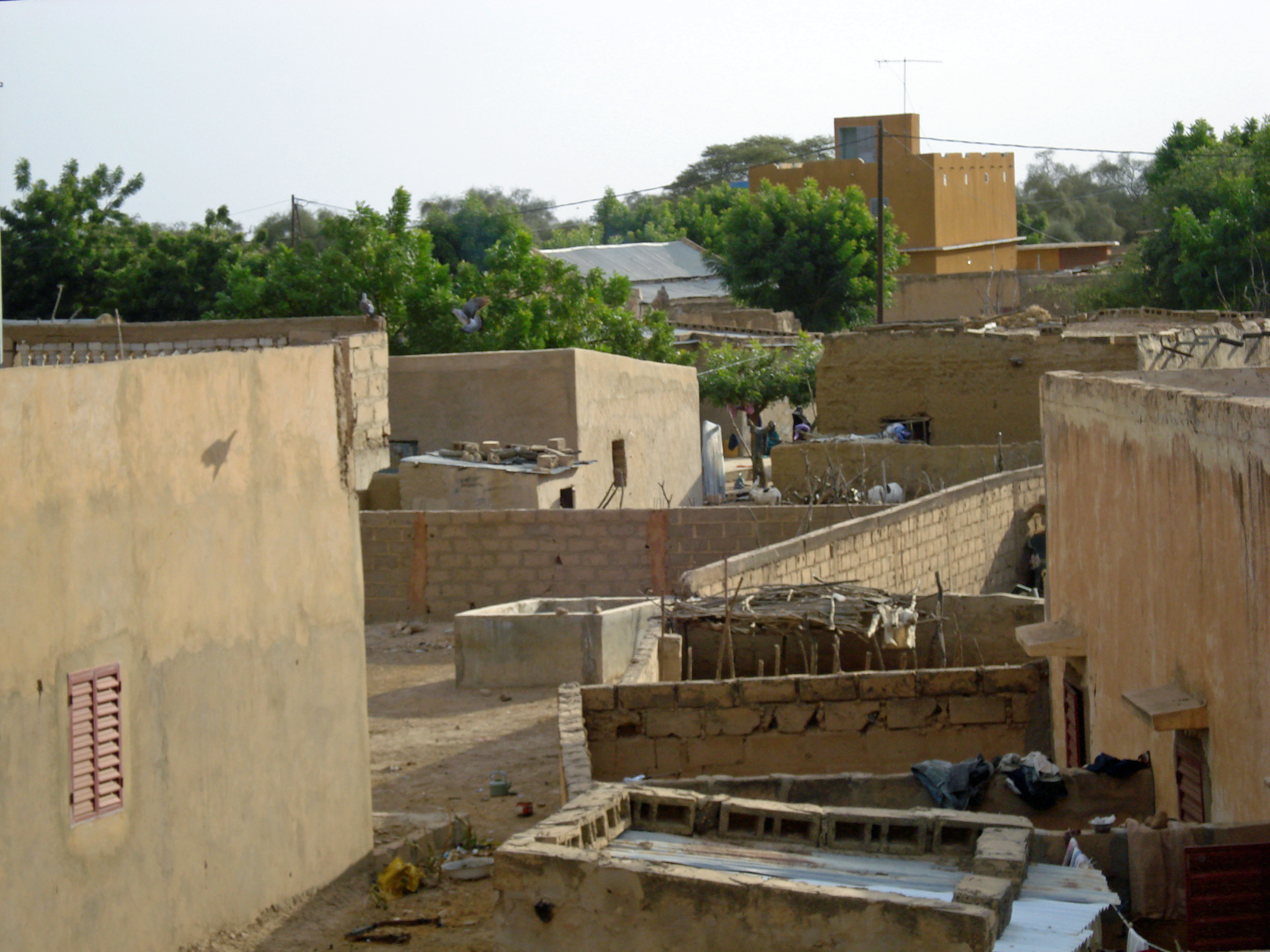
- Inside the Agnam-Goly village

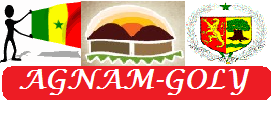

- Location in Senegal
- Coordinates: 16°0′29″N 13°41′35″W
- Country: Senegal
- Region: Matam Region
- Department: Matam Department
- Established: B. 1529

Government
  - Type: Village
  - Diagaraf: Oumar Sall (since 2001)

Area
  - Total: 5 km^{2} (1.9 sq mi)

Population (2011)
  - Total: 5,325
- Time zone: UTC+0 (GMT)
- Postal code: 04
- Website: http://www.agnam-goly.org

Agnam-Goly is a Sahelian village in north-eastern Senegal with a population of 5,325 inhabitants. The village is located in the Matam Department of Matam Region, approximately 630 kilometers (390 mi) to the northeast of Dakar, on the bank of the Senegal River.

== History ==
=== Founding ===
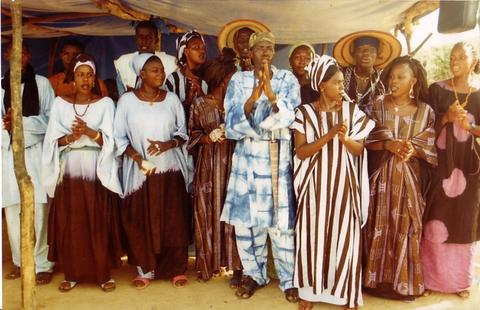
Villagers in traditional clothing

Agnam-Goly was founded by the Thioye family well before the year 1529. The Thioye began to inhabit caves in the dieri to the south of the village, over 12 meters (39 feet) above the ground. These caves, protected from the elements by large rocks, can still be visited today. The early inhabitants of Agnam-Goly left behind a mosque surrounded by a stone wall before moving north to the walo, which is the site used by the village today for agriculture and fishing.

At first, the village consisted of a single hearth surrounded by huts, each of which housed one family. This arrangement served to strengthen family ties and encourage solidarity between neighbors. These early structures, some of which are still standing, are located in the center of the modern village of Agnam-Goly.

The village contains six traditional quarters, each with its own prominent family: Cooyɓe-e-Kuñ'njooɓe, Jalluɓe-e-Gaajooɓe, Jooɓɓe-e-Barooɓe, Salsalɓe-e-Mbaayɓe and Sinc'cu-e-Caareen.

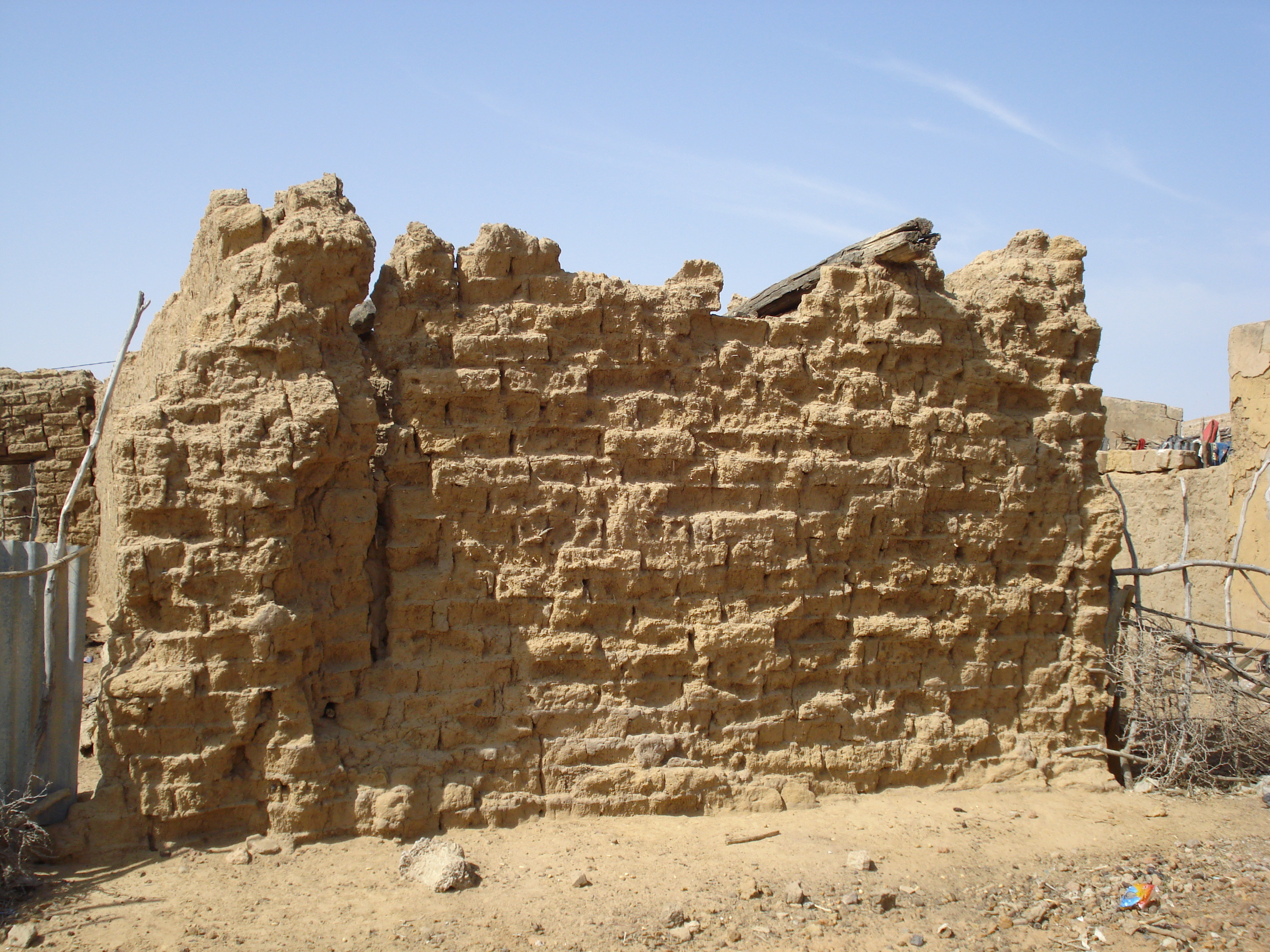
The first buildings

When Fouta was conquered by Koli Teŋella in the 16th century, Agnam-Goly – like the other Agnam villages – was already a fair-sized town. As Oumar Kane notes:

“The West Booseya extends from Hoorefoonde to Bokijawe. This is a stretch of village communities, some of which are true towns: the Aañam [Wuro-Moolo, Goli, Liiduɓe, Coɗay, Wuro-Sira, Siwol, Godo, Tulel-Calle, Ɓaarga], the large grouping of Cilon, Daabia Odeeji, Kobillo, Gudduɗe-Joobbe and Gudduɗe Ndueetɗe, Voki-Jawe.”

=== Myth of Dooroy and Boda-ngal ===
The myth of Dooroy and Boda-ngal is still alive in Agnam-Goly:

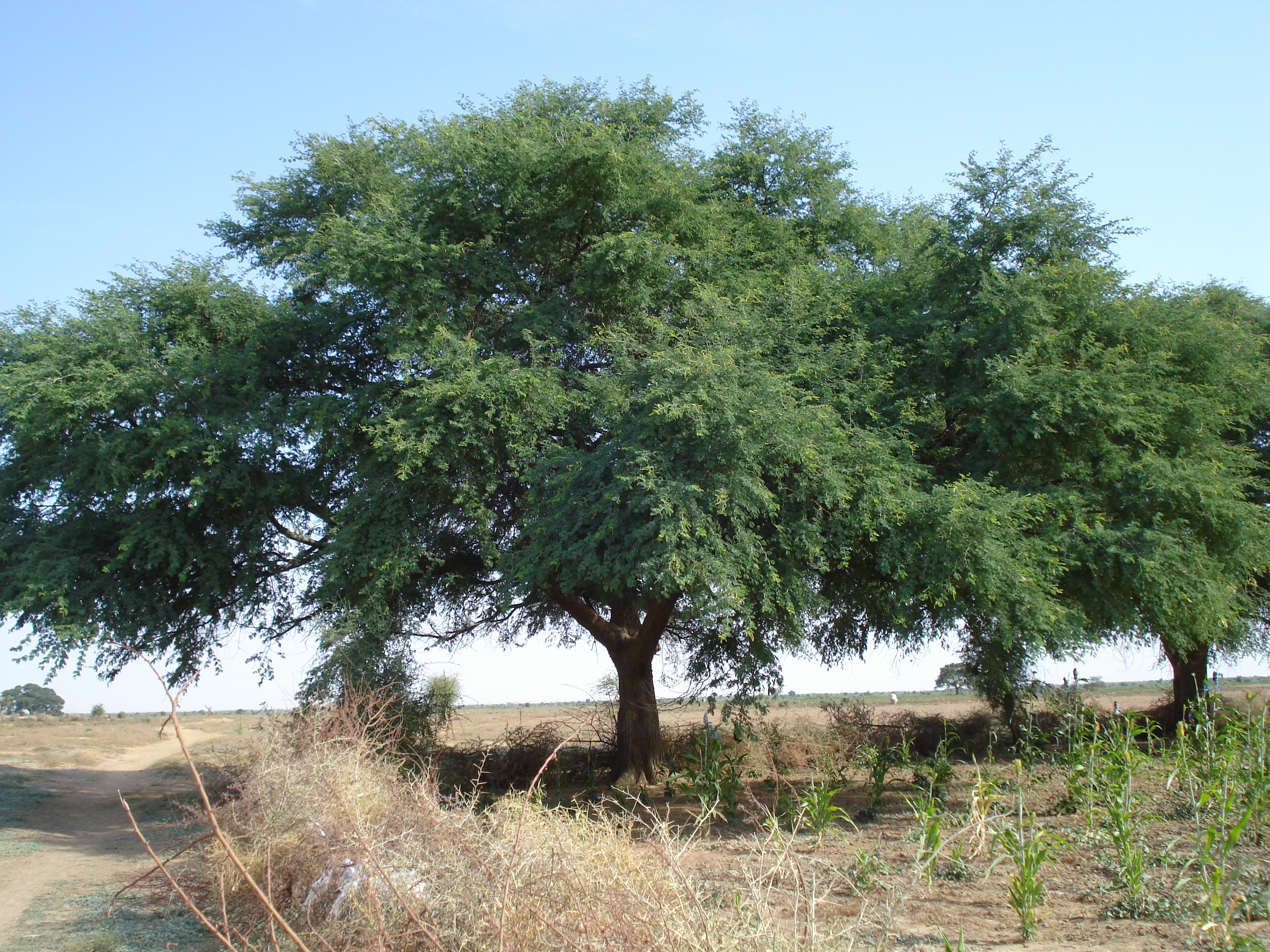
Site of Dooroy - Boda-ngal

“Dooroy” is located in the walo and “Boda-ngal” in the dieri. These two mythical places are inhabited by the spirit of the legendary "Mbaroodi Dooroy" who migrates back and forth between Dooroy and Boda-ngal with the flooding and receding of the Sénégal River. Whether he is in Dooroy or in Boda-ngal, the Mbaroodi Dooroy can never live anywhere but in a well or spring. The Dooroy contains a little stream running through a dense forest of acacia trees, not far from Tain-ngu pond. The Boda-ngal contains the Biidal pond and the cemetery.

This Mbaroodi Dooroy is a male spirit, who lost his male organs in a fight with the “Mbaroodi Maayel Barga”, taking one of his opponent's eyes in revenge. The two spirits are separated by the Barga pond. During a long dry season, the Mbaroodi Dooroy tried in vain to conquer this pond. And using a dream as an intermediary, he commanded the villagers to dig a well for him in the Dooroy and to pour milk into it as an offering. At the same time, he issued this warning:

“You shall not wash your mats and pots there, newly married and pregnant women shall not approach the well, and above all, you shall not urinate there.”

When the Sénégal River floods, his favorite spot, “Boorti Thioura”, is always in motion: the water moves and its depth is unimaginable.

At times of need, the wise elders of the village invoke the Mbaarodi Dooroy by means of a secret formula that begins with the words “Yaa Dooroy, yaa Boda-ngal...”, and their sacred clay.

== Geography ==
=== Location ===
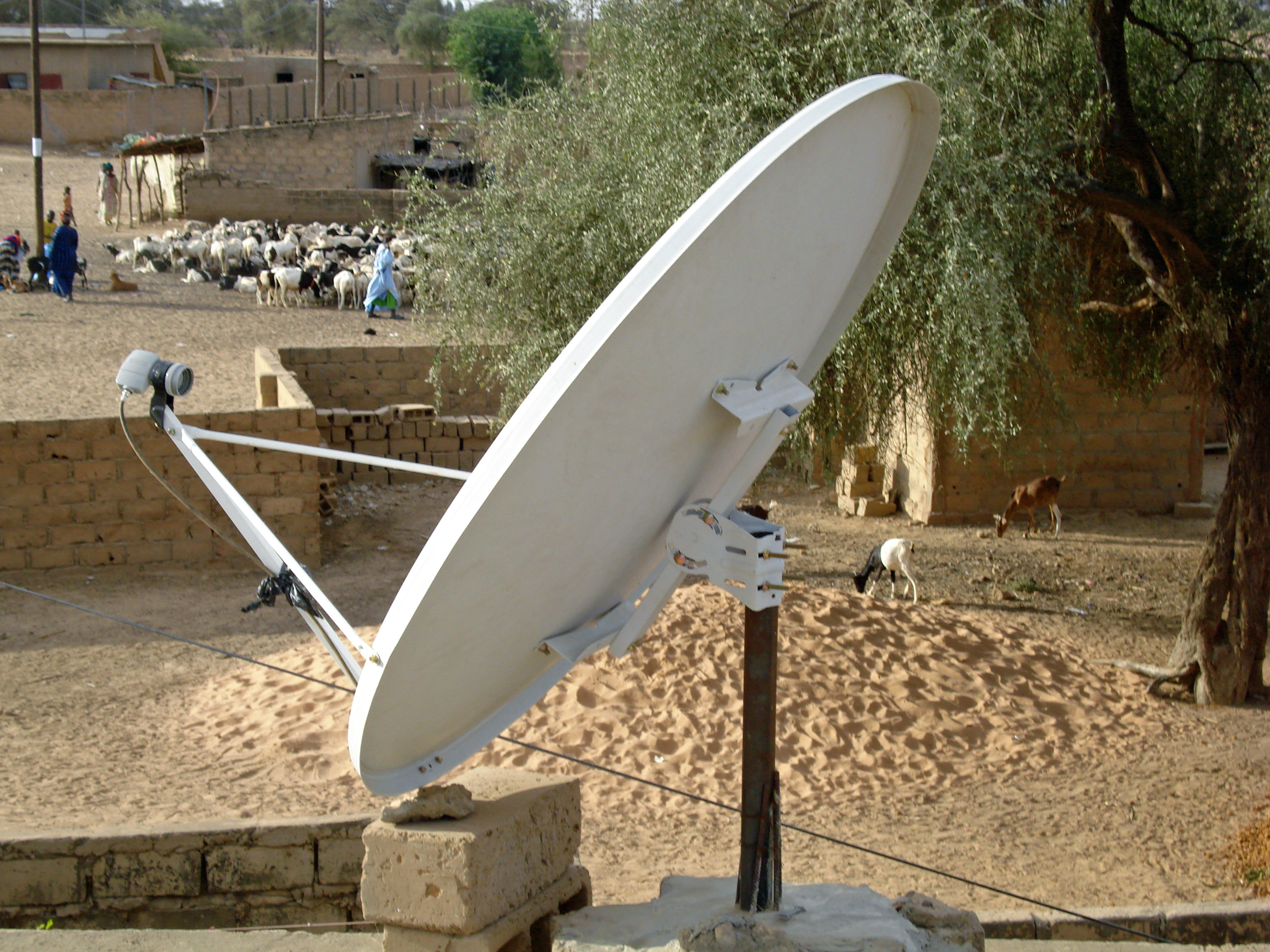
Agnam-Goly, between tradition and modernity.

Agnam-Goly is located in north-eastern Senegal, on the southern bank of the Senegal River. It is traversed by the N2 highway, which links Matam (to the southeast) with Dagana (to the northwest), passing between the villages of Thilogne and Pete Ngour.

The village belongs to the rural community and to the district of Agnam Civol, in the Ranérou Ferlo Department of the Matam Region.

The altitude, which ranges from ten to thirteen meters (32 to 42 feet), averages twelve meters (39 feet).

The village is located between the walo, a clayey, flood-prone area, to the north and the dieri, formed by sand dunes studded with rocks, to the south.

Professor Oumar Kane of the Cheikh Anta Diop University, a Fouta-Toro specialist, describes the importance of water in this region, which draws much of its resources from flood-based agriculture:

"From Duumga to Mbaan, the low floodplain spreads as far as the eye can see, extending over 50 kilometers. This explains the dense concentration of jeejegol villages between Duumga and Hoorefoonde: Vokijawe, Dabia-Koɓvillo, Cilon, Kaaƴe-Pawe, Ɓaarga, Tulel-Calle, Godo, Siwol, Wuro-Siree, Coɗay, Goli, Wuro-Molo, Liiduɓe, Asnde Balla, Njaakir, Hooƴo, etc."

=== Climate ===
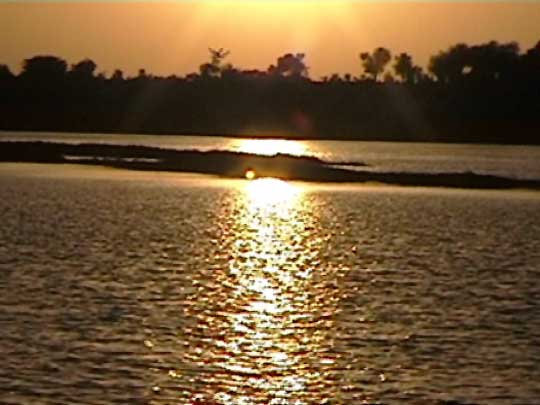
Sunset in Agnam-Goly

Agnam-Goly is located in the Sahel region of Senegal. It has a tropical climate with a dry period that divides the year into two seasons, with continuous sunlight throughout.

The dry season lasts from early November to late June. This is when the harmattan, a hot, dry wind from the east, drives back the alizé, a cool, humid wind from the south-southwest. The harmattan brings heat – with temperatures above 43 °C (109 °F) – and dryness, so that there is little or no precipitation.

The wet season lasts from early July to late October. During this time, the alizé comes from the southwest, bringing monsoon winds that cool the air, and heavy rain. Wet season temperatures alternate between hot and cool, with lows reaching 21 °C (70 °F).

Almost all of Agnam-Goly's precipitation falls during the wet season, but the rains begin slightly earlier, in August. For many years, rainfall has been decreasing, and the first rains arrive later in the season, which is a source of worry for the local people.

=== Infrastructure and Public Services ===
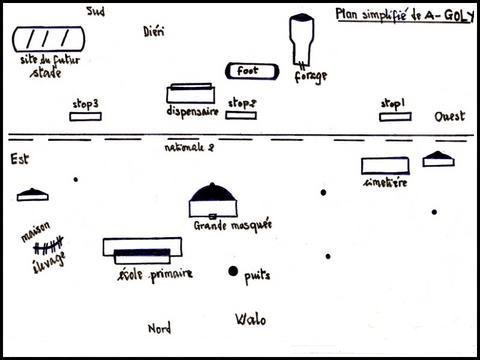
Diagram of the village

The village of Agnam-Goly is traversed by the N2 national highway and possesses the following infrastructure and services:

- A school with twelve classrooms, six of which were built by the village with locally raised funds, with partial connection to electricity;
- A health clinic equipped with an ambulance that is currently out of service;
- A borehole and six wells;
- A credit and savings mutual, managed by the women of Agnam-Goly (DGL MEC Felo Agnam);
- A soccer field, where the village plans to build a stadium; and
- A central market and a weekly market.

Remittances from relatives who have emigrated have allowed many of Agnam-Goly's residents to build living quarters on the roof or second floor of their houses.

=== Demography ===
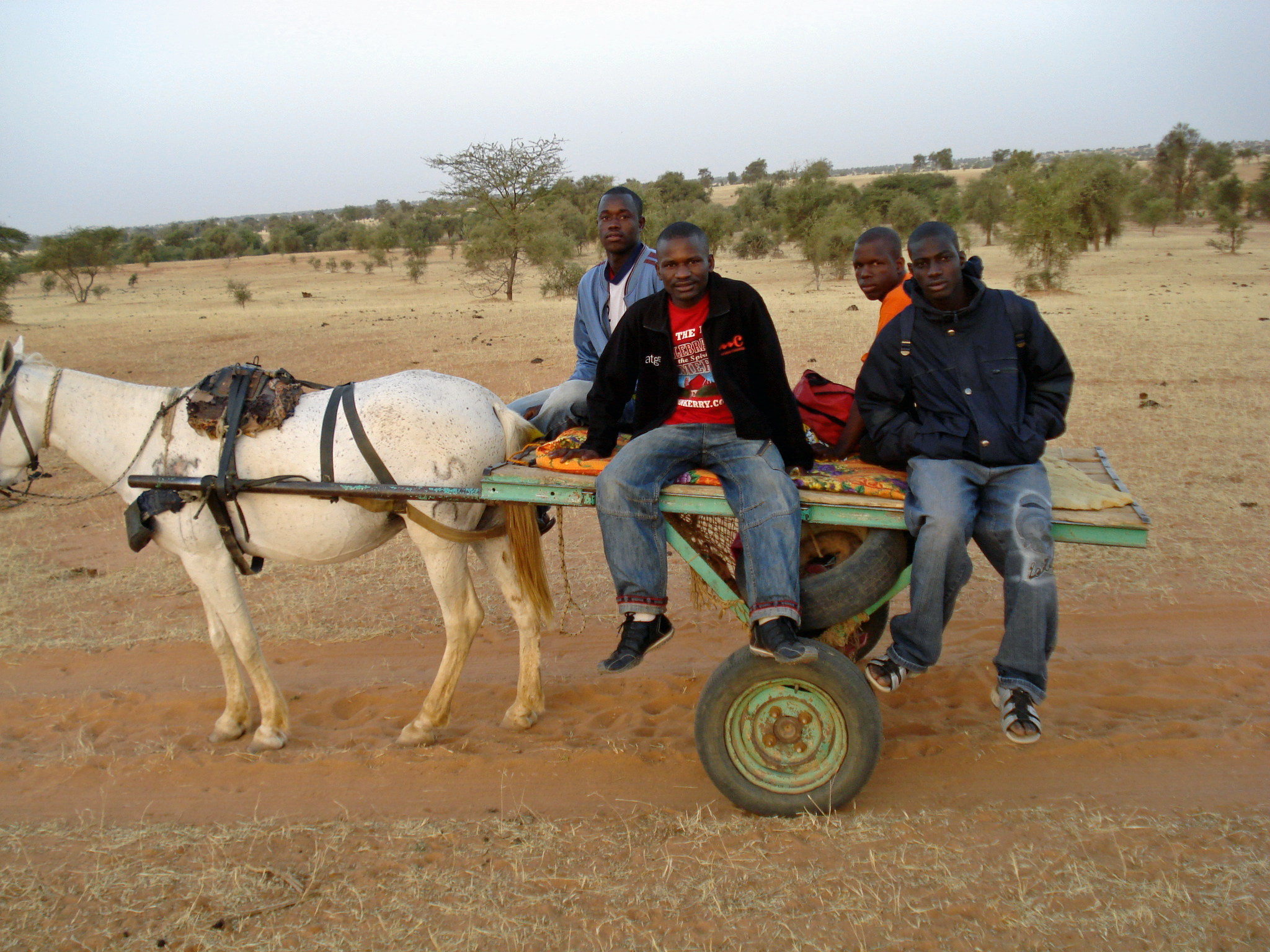
Local young men

In 2003, Agnam-Goly had a population of 3,143 inhabitants, divided among 318 households.

=== Religion ===
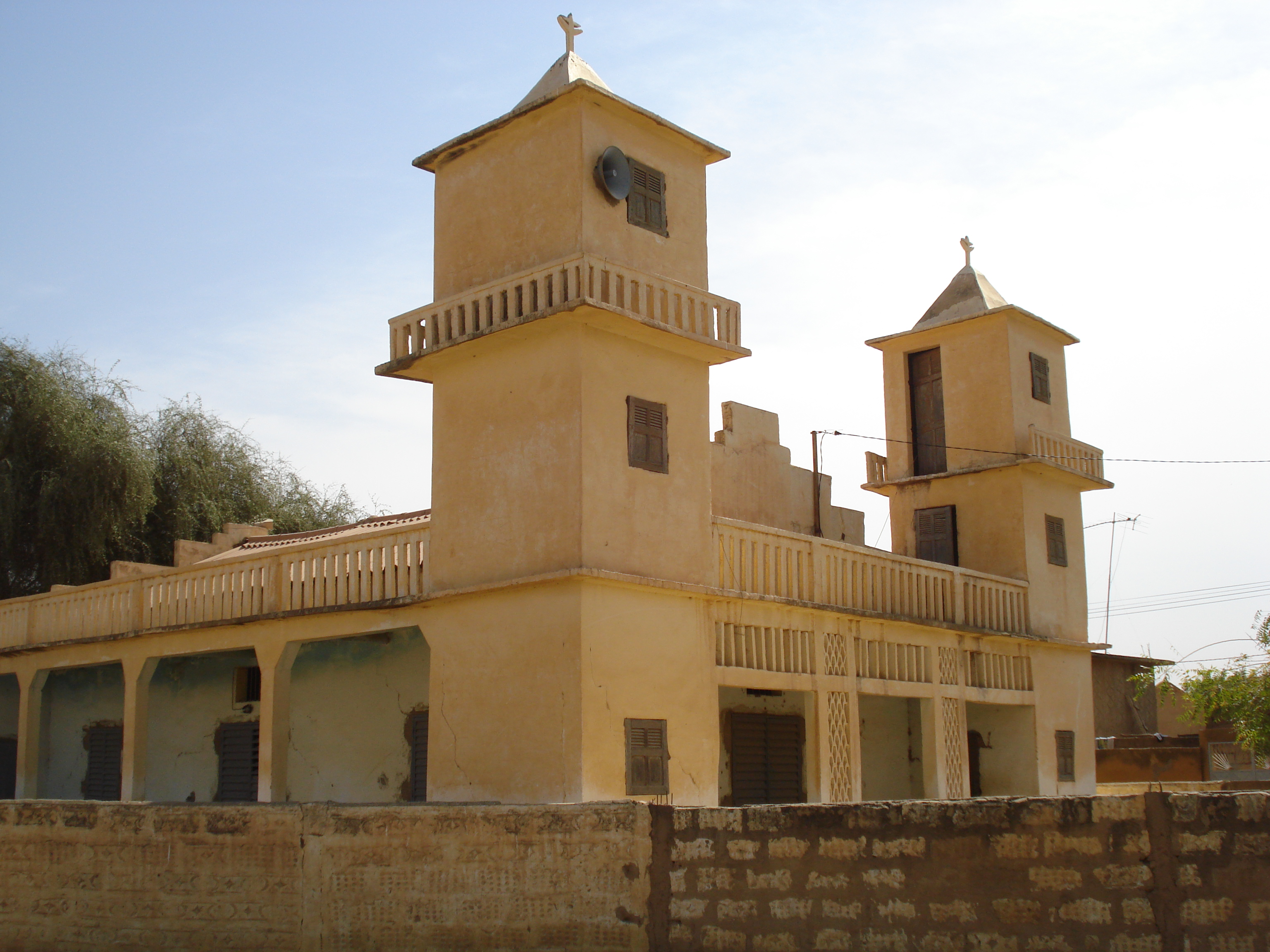
The main mosque

The presence of traditional myths does not interfere with the practice of Islam, which is the principal religion of the village.

== Government and Society ==
=== The Council of Elders ===
Governing power belongs to the Council of Elders, which is composed of prominent members of the six traditional quarters of the village. The Council of Elders selects the Chief of the village and removes him in the case of serious incapacity, or if he proves incompetent in his duties of mediating disputes between villagers.

The Council of Elders also has jurisdiction over agriculture, social issues, sanitation, education, etc., and thus serves as the ultimate judge and manages the daily government of the village.

=== The Chief of the Village ===
The Chief of the village is traditionally chosen by the Council of Elders from the “royal” Sall family. The Chief serves for life, but in case of incapacity, he is obliged to return his status to the Council of Elders, as the position is not hereditary. The Sarr family organizes the traditional inauguration of the Chief, which is a great ceremony. If there is a dispute over his successor, the chieftainship is turned over to this family until the Council of Elders agrees on the selection of a new Chief. The Chief of the village carries the title “Diagaraph”, and every man of the Sall family carries the title of “Lawahé” or Prince.

The Chief works in concert with the Council of Elders. He represents the village on administrative issues, and can act in its name. The Chief has the right to convoke the Council of Elders, who must respect his summons. He keeps the Great Drum of the village, along with a town crier. The Chief owns great fields of fertile land, and can call upon the work of every villager. He delivers the verdicts of the Council of Elders.

=== The seasonal village of Ndoussoudji ===
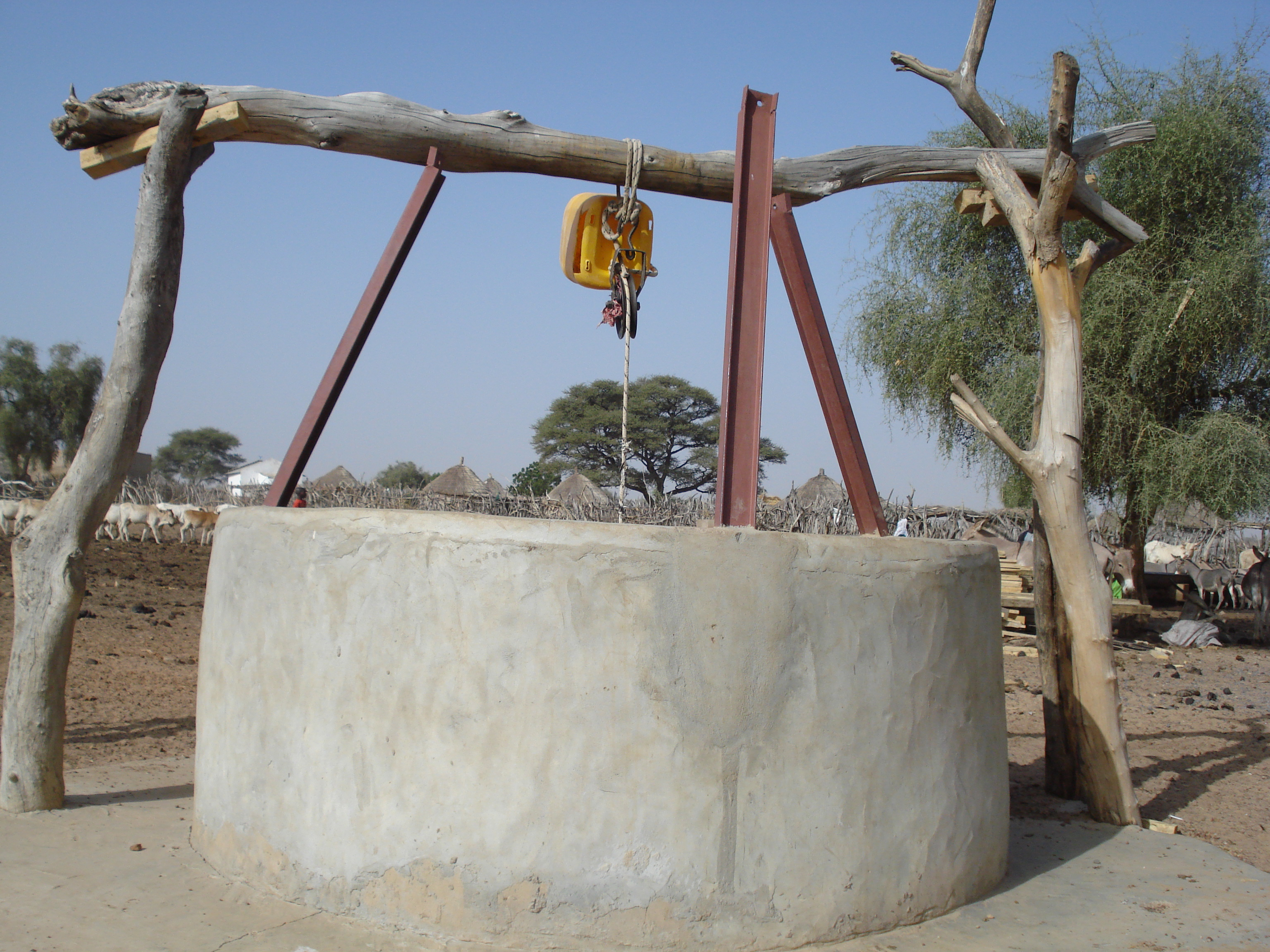
The Samba Binta well

Ndoussoudji is an extension of the village that is located in the dieri, 35 kilometers (22 mi) from Agnam-Goly. Approximately ten families go there in wagons during the wet season to cultivate the land and graze their livestock. Ndoussoudji has now become a small village, with a large well and herds of livestock. The buildings there are made of baked earth thatched with dry grass, except for the mosque which is built in cement. The water tower ensures a supply of potable water for the village.

== Culture ==
=== Education ===
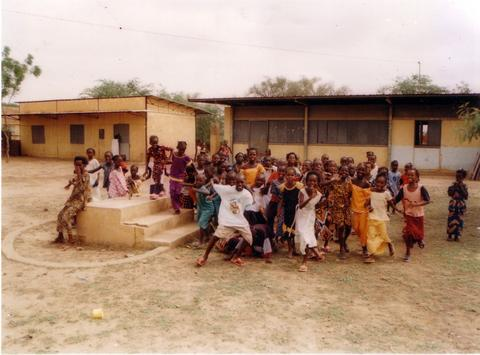
Agnam-Goly school and students

The elementary school of Agnam-Goly was founded in 1960. It originally had two classrooms. Today, it has twelve classrooms, some of which have electricity; a small library; two large courtyards for recreation; toilets and living quarters for the director of the school. 593 children attended the school in the 2006–2007 school year: 221 girls and 372 boys, divided into twelve classes with one teacher per class. Learning conditions are difficult for many reasons: overcrowding (three students share a bench and a single book), high student/teacher ratio, lack of teaching materials, and limited resources of the Parents Association which supports the school.

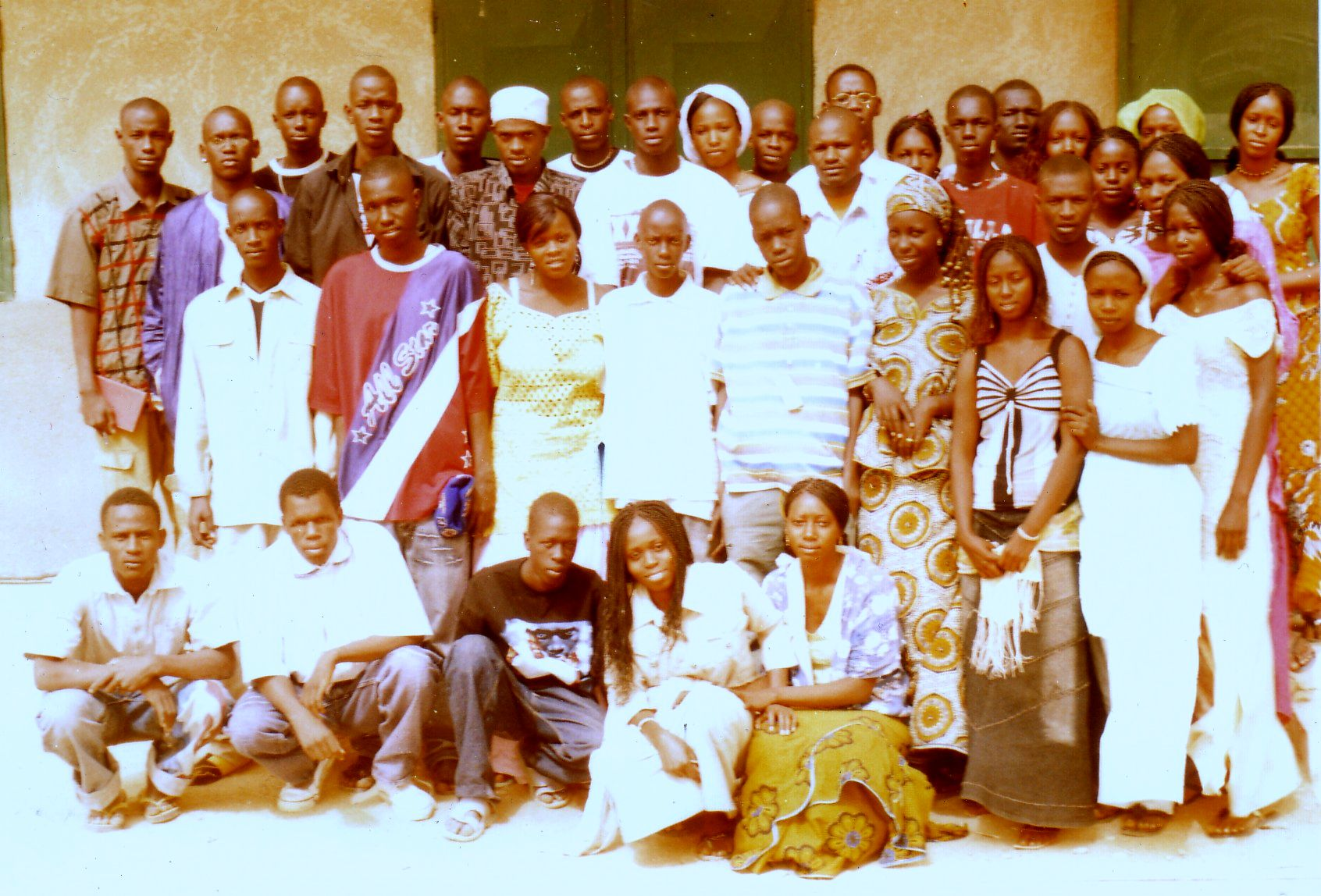
Agnam Goly students

The village's 67 junior high school students attend the Agnam high school, three kilometers' (1.5 miles') walk from the village, while the 27 high school students attend the high schools of Matam and Thilogne. Most of the village's 21 university students attend the Cheikh Anta Diop University in Dakar, and study liberal arts, social sciences, law, economics, medicine, natural sciences and engineering. It is often difficult for them to find lodging and participate fully in university life.

The Coranic school also contributes to the education of the young people of the village.

For decades the students of Agnam-Goly have left their studies for migrant work. Nevertheless, the village has many students today thanks to its promotion of education: building classrooms, providing electricity and teaching materials for the school, organizing workshops in Dakar to introduce its students to computers and the Internet, and building a ten-room house for volunteer teachers.

=== Traditions ===
Tradition and modernity coexist in Agnam-Goly. Fula literacy teachers are very active in promoting culture through theater, awareness days, and traditional ceremonies.

== Economy and Development ==
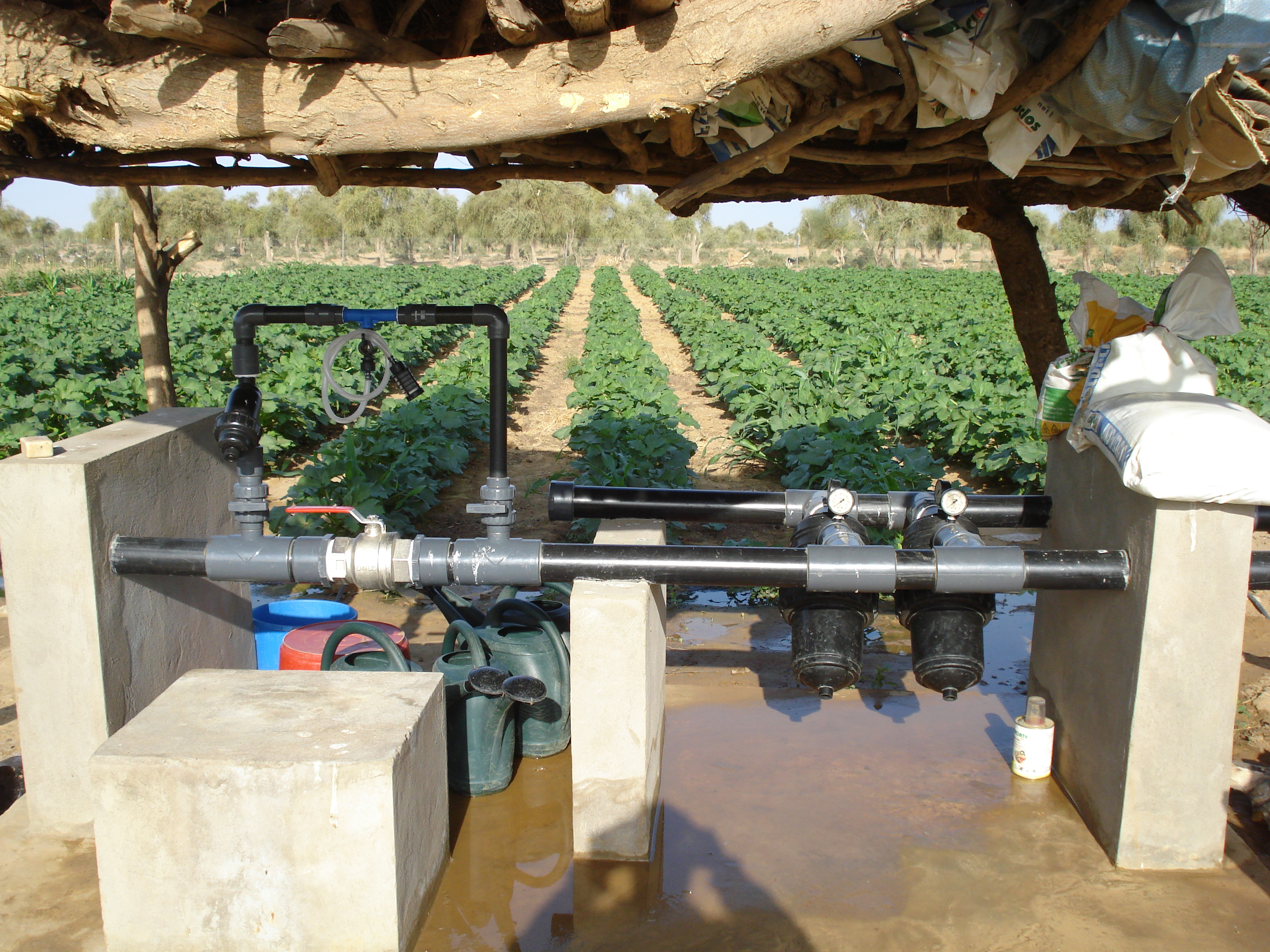
Drip irrigation system

The villagers of Agnam-Goly cultivate sorghum, corn, beans and watermelons in the walo following the seasonal flooding of the Sénégal River. During the wet season, millet, beans, bissap, melon, and sorghum are grown in the dieri.

Agriculture in the village is undergoing a crisis, because rainfall has decreased, irrigation is insufficient, the soil is depleted of nutrients, the price of fertilizer is high, and locusts and other pests attack crops. Nevertheless, horticulture gardening is expected to benefit the village over the coming years.

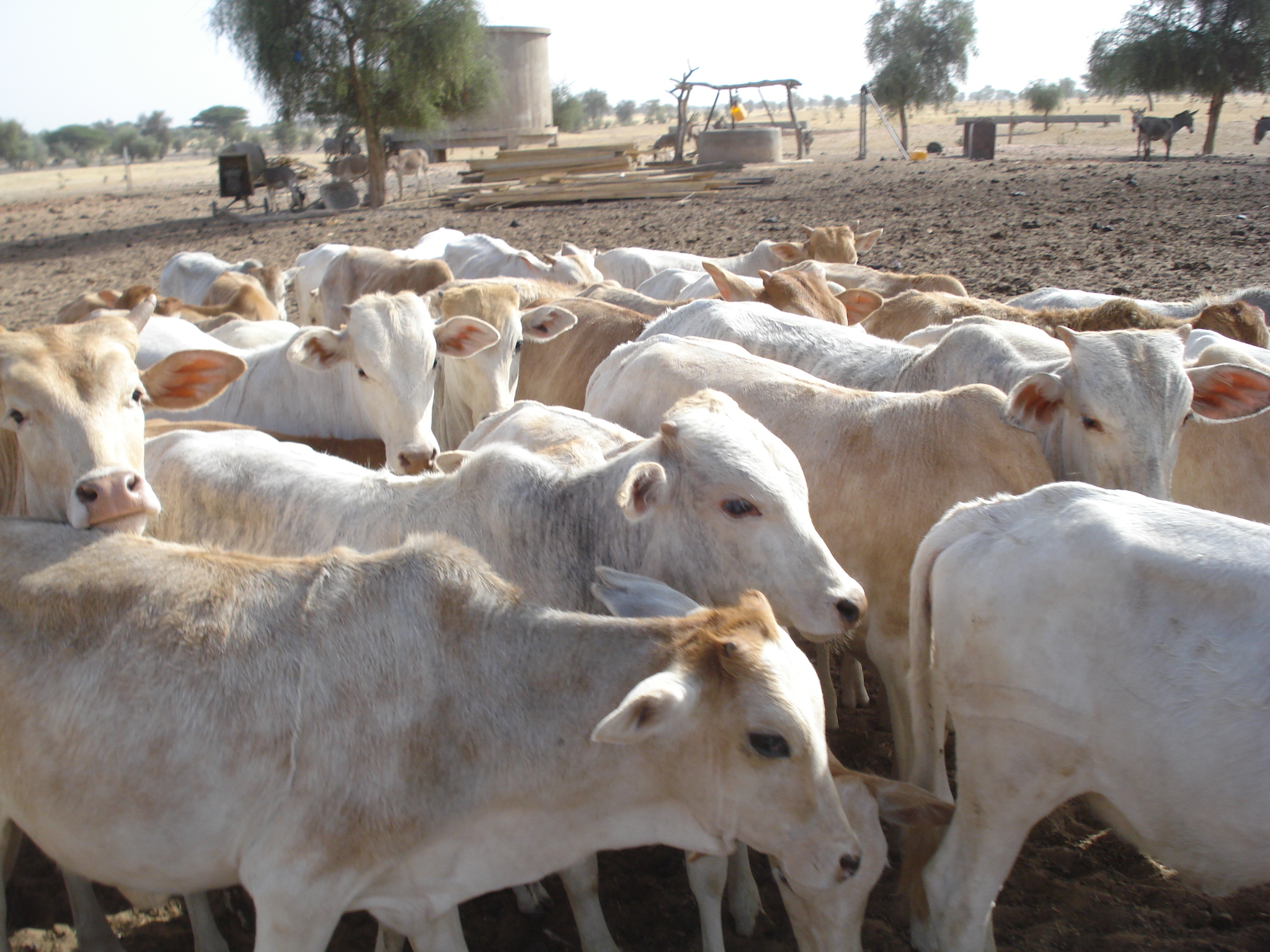
Cattle at Ndoussoudji

In addition to agriculture, the villagers engage extensively in livestock herding, consisting mainly of cattle, sheep, and goats. Poultry raising is uncommon, as is commercial trading.

The village depends on migrant labor for its subsistence. These migrants support their families by sending monthly remittances, which are used to buy food and pay for school and health care.

=== Village Associations ===
- Association des ressortissants d'Agnam-Goly en France (ARAGF)
- Association des jeunes d'Agnam-Goly (AJAG) ;
- Association des femmes d'Agnam-Goly (AFAG) ;
- Association des élèves et étudiants ressortissants d'Agnam-Goly (AEERAG) ;
- Dental Agnam-Goly en France.
