= Dioulol =

- Location within Senegal

Location
- Countries: Senegal

Physical characteristics
- Mouth: Senegal River
  - coordinates: 15°38′16″N 13°14′37″W
- Length: 55 km (34 mi)

The Dioulol is a left southwest branch of the Senegal River in the Senegalese region of Matam.

== Geography ==
The Dioulol branches off from the main stream between the village of Balél and the neighboring town of Waoundé. Therefore, the name Tchangol Balél can be found variously for this watercourse, but only official evidence for the name Dioulol is found.

55.5 kilometers further north-west, shortly before the regional and departmental prefecture of Matam, the main and secondary streams reunite.

The Dioulol river bed, initially around 20 meters wide, meanders through a five to 15 kilometer wide alluvial plain and, depending on the season, feeds a more or less large network of confusing branches, impassable wetlands and stagnant water. The water flow of the Dioulol, which only flows during and after the rainy season, is often lost halfway before it can reach the town of Kanel. The name is lost too. However, there is a continuous system of water beds, which also have significant waterflow down from Kanel, and even expand in between to a lake, the Vèndou Kanel, and then return all the water to the main stream shortly above Matam.

The flow rate from the main stream into the Dioulol is regulated by a 60-meter-wide weir shortly after the branch. There is also a road bridge spanning 110 meters for the regional road R 42, which, starting from the national road N2 near Semmé, follows the bank of the main river via the town of Waoundé to Matam.

The town of Hamady Ounaré is located on the mainland bank of the Dioulol.
