= Subdivisions of Senegal =

Senegal is subdivided into four levels of administrative divisions.

== Regions ==
Regions of Senegal

At the top level are the Regions of Senegal and their elected administrative body. The 14 regions (régions, singular - région), are administered by a Conseil Régionaux, which is elected by population weight at the Arrondissement level.

Region	Capital	Area (km^{2})	Population (2013 census)
Dakar	Dakar	547	3,137,196
Ziguinchor	Ziguinchor	7,352	549,151
Diourbel	Diourbel	4,824	1,497,455
Saint-Louis	Saint-Louis	19,241	908,942
Tambacounda	Tambacounda	42,364	681,310
Kaolack	Kaolack	5,357	960,875
Thiès	Thiès	6,670	1,788,864
Louga	Louga	24,889	874,193
Fatick	Fatick	6,849	835,352
Kolda	Kolda	13,771	714,392
Matam	Matam	29,445	562,539
Kaffrine	Kaffrine	11,262	566,992
Kédougou	Kédougou	16,800	152,357
Sédhiou	Sédhiou	7,341	452,944

== Departments ==
Regions are subdivided into Departments, which are strictly administrative entities with no independent political power.

== Arrondissements ==
Departments are made up of Arrondissements. These are also purely administrative structures, with prefects appointed by the central government.

== Communes ==
City arrondissements (such as in Dakar and Pikine) are divided into Communes d'arrondissement. In the Dakar Region, since 1996, the four Arrondissements have been subdivided into such Communes d'arrondissement, with appointed Sub-Prefects, answerable to their Arrondissement Prefects. Outside the large cities, the built up areas are titled communes de ville and the rural arrondissements divided into communautés rurales which maintain the same powers: city councils and mayors, directly elected.

Senegal's subdivisions number 14 régions, 45 départements, 133 arrondissements, 46 communes d'arrondissement, 113 communes de ville and 370 communautés rurales.
