= Ranérou =

- Town and commune
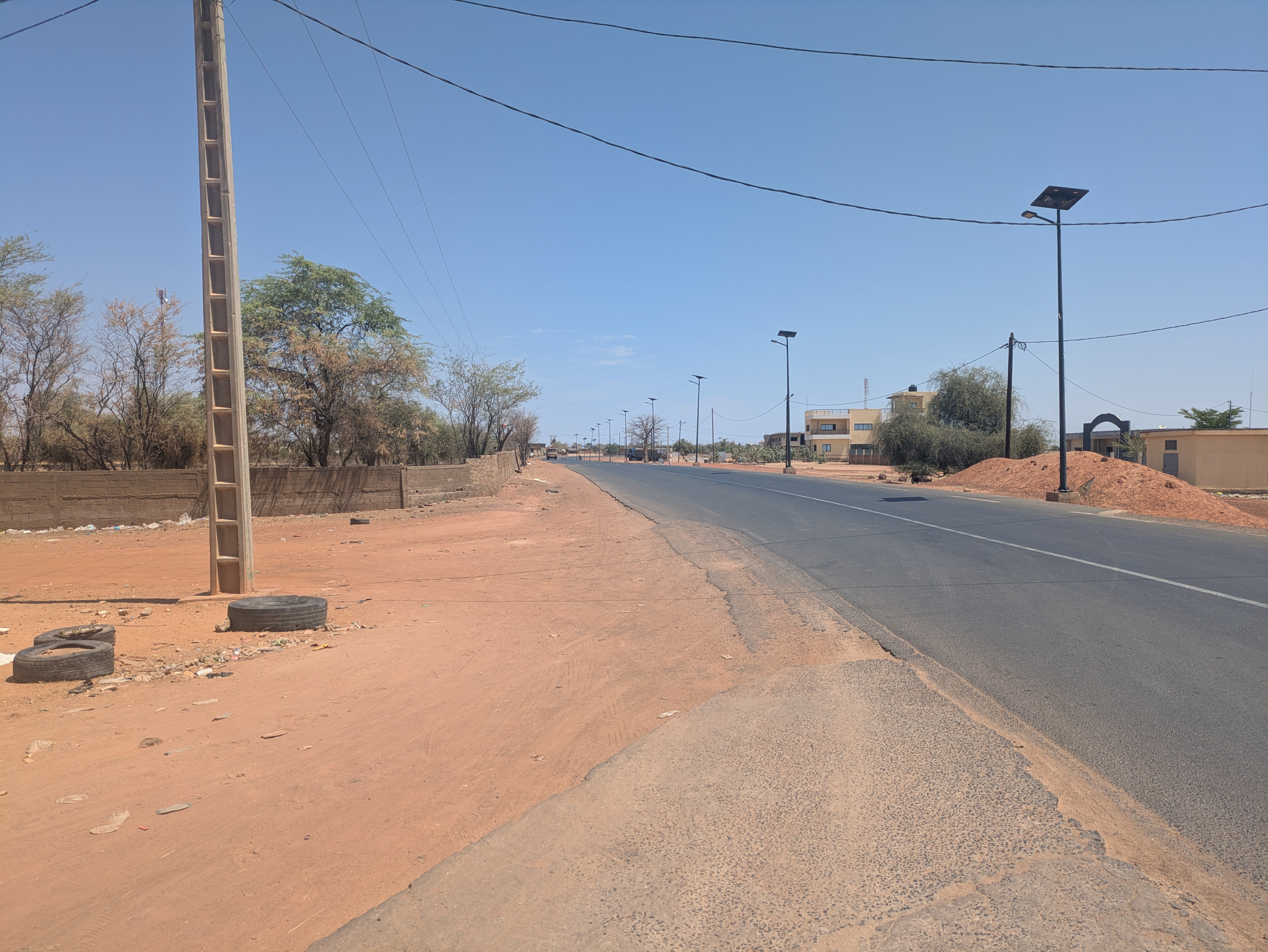
- The N3 in Ranerou

- Location in Senegal
- Coordinates: 15°18′N 13°58′W
- Country: Senegal
- Region: Matam
- Department: Matam

Area
  - Town and commune: 2.424 km^{2} (0.936 sq mi)

Population (2023 census)
  - Town and commune: 4,648
  - Density: 1,917/km^{2} (4,966/sq mi)
- Time zone: UTC+0 (GMT)

Ranérou is a small town with commune status in north-east Senegal. It is the chief settlement of Ranérou-Ferlo Department in Matam Region and is connected to Dakar and Touba to the west and Ouro Sogui and Mauritania to the east by the N3 road.

In 2013 its population was recorded at just over 3,000.

== Climate ==
Climate data for Ranerou (1991–2020)
| Month | Jan | Feb | Mar | Apr | May | Jun | Jul | Aug | Sep | Oct | Nov | Dec | Year |
|---|---|---|---|---|---|---|---|---|---|---|---|---|---|
| Mean daily maximum °C (°F) | 33.4 (92.1) | 36.1 (97.0) | 39.2 (102.6) | 41.6 (106.9) | 42.5 (108.5) | 40.1 (104.2) | 36.1 (97.0) | 34.3 (93.7) | 34.5 (94.1) | 38.2 (100.8) | 37.8 (100.0) | 34.6 (94.3) | 37.4 (99.3) |
| Mean daily minimum °C (°F) | 17.1 (62.8) | 19.6 (67.3) | 22.5 (72.5) | 25.0 (77.0) | 26.8 (80.2) | 26.6 (79.9) | 25.4 (77.7) | 24.6 (76.3) | 24.1 (75.4) | 23.9 (75.0) | 20.5 (68.9) | 17.7 (63.9) | 22.8 (73.0) |
| Average precipitation mm (inches) | 0.1 (0.00) | 1.1 (0.04) | 0.0 (0.0) | 0.1 (0.00) | 4.0 (0.16) | 33.3 (1.31) | 100.2 (3.94) | 147.6 (5.81) | 120.5 (4.74) | 31.6 (1.24) | −0.1 (0.0) | 0.9 (0.04) | 439.3 (17.30) |
| Average precipitation days (≥ 1.0 mm) | 0.0 | 0.2 | 0.0 | 0.0 | 0.3 | 2.7 | 6.7 | 9.8 | 8.9 | 2.2 | 0.0 | 0.2 | 31.0 |
Source: NOAA
