= Samba Diouldé Thiam =

Senegalese politician

Samba Diouldé Thiam is a Senegalese politician from Matam. He is a member of the National Assembly of Senegal.

== See also ==
- Politics of Senegal
