= Dembancané =

- Town and commune
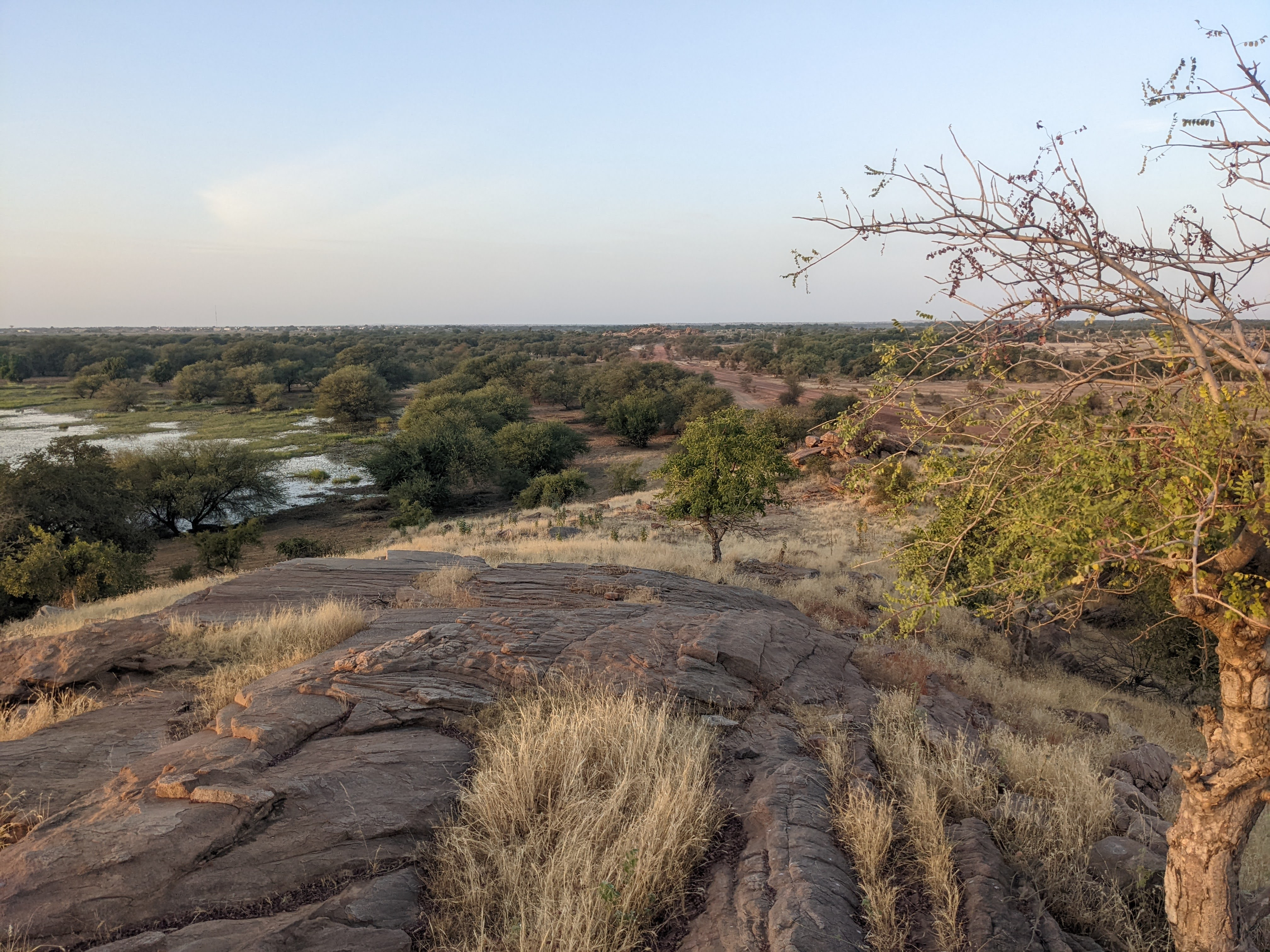
- The Senegal river valley near Dembancané

- Location in Senegal
- Coordinates: 15.09°N 12.706°W
- Country: Senegal
- Region: Matam Region
- Department: Kanel

Area
  - Town and commune: 1.384 km^{2} (0.534 sq mi)

Population (2023 census)
  - Town and commune: 5,781
  - Density: 4,177/km^{2} (10,820/sq mi)
- Time zone: UTC+0 (GMT)

Dembancané is a town and commune located in the Matam Region of Senegal.
