= Kanel department =

Coordinates: 15°29′30″N 13°10′35″W

Kanel
- Department
- Location in the Matam region
- Country: Senegal
- Region: Matam region
- Capital: Kanel

Population (2023 census)
  - Total: 342,507
- Time zone: UTC+0 (GMT)

Kanel department is one of the 46 departments of Senegal, located in the Matam region in the east of the country.

The department has six communes; Kanel, Semmé, Waounde, Dembakané, Hamady Ounaré, and Sinthiou Bamambé-Banadji.

The rural districts (communautés rurales) comprise:

- Arrondissement of Orkadiere:
  - Aouré
  - Bokiladji
  - Orkadiere
- Arrondissement of Wouro Sidy:
  - Wouro Sidy
  - Ndendory

== Historic sites ==
- Mausoleum of Cheikh Moussa Kamara at Ganguel
- The mosque of Kobilo
- The mosque of Séno Palel
- Mausoleum of Abdel Kader Kane
