= Ranérou Ferlo department =

Department of Senegal

Coordinates: 15°18′N 13°58′W

Ranérou Ferlo
- Department
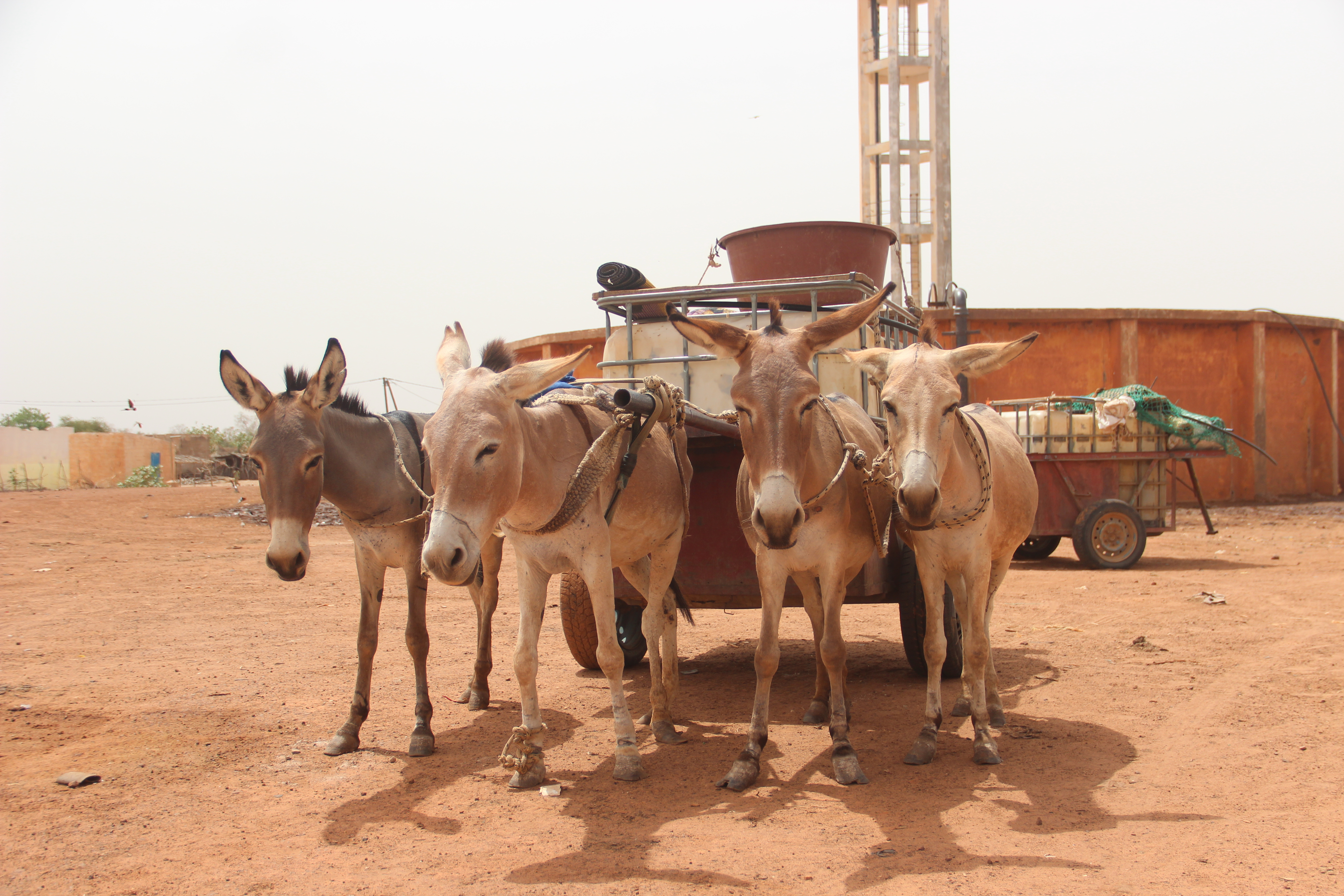
- Horse-drawn cart in Younoufere

- Location in the Matam region
- Country: Senegal
- Region: Matam region
- Capital: Ranérou

Population (2023 census)
  - Total: 103,283
- Time zone: UTC+0 (GMT)

Ranérou Ferlo department is one of the departments of Senegal, located in the Matam region of the country.

== Subdivisions ==
The only commune located within the department is the capital Ranérou. The rural districts (communautés rurales) comprise:

- Arrondissement de Vélingara:
  - Lougré Thioly
  - Oudalaye
  - Vélingara

== Population ==
In the census of 2002, the population was 41,660. In 2005, it was estimated at 48,475.
