= Thilogne =

- Town and commune
- Location in Senegal
- Coordinates: 15°55′26″N 13°39′28″W
- Country: Senegal
- Region: Matam
- Department: Matam

Area
  - Town and commune: 2.435 km^{2} (0.940 sq mi)

Population (2023 census)
  - Town and commune: 15,044
  - Density: 6,178/km^{2} (16,000/sq mi)
- Time zone: UTC+0 (GMT)

Thilogne (Thilouki in Pulaar) is a town in northeast Senegal with the status of a commune. It lies in the Matam Department of Matam Region, 20 km (12 mi) from Kaédi, Mauretania and connected to Dakar via the N2 road.

In 2023 Thilogne had a population of 15,044. There are twelve mosques, two elementary schools, a middle school, and a lycée (high school). There is a dispensary and a small market.

Thilogne is twinned with Trappes in France.

== History ==
Thilogne is part of the Futa Tooro region of northwestern Senegal. From the 9th to the 13th centuries it was part of the state of Takrur and by the Empire of Great Fulo from AD 1490 to 1776. Abdul Kader Kane, first Almamy of the Imamate of Futa Toro, made Thilogne his capital.

During the 1960s and 1970s, Thilogne was part of Matam Department, Fleuve Region.

The Thilogne Association Développement (Thilogne Development Association) was established in 1995; it organizes a festival every two years and has helped to rehabilitate and construct schools and a dispensary.

Notable people from Thilogne include Seydou Barry (1943–2007).
