= Niokolo Koba =

River in Senegal

Coordinates: 13°01′N 13°14′W

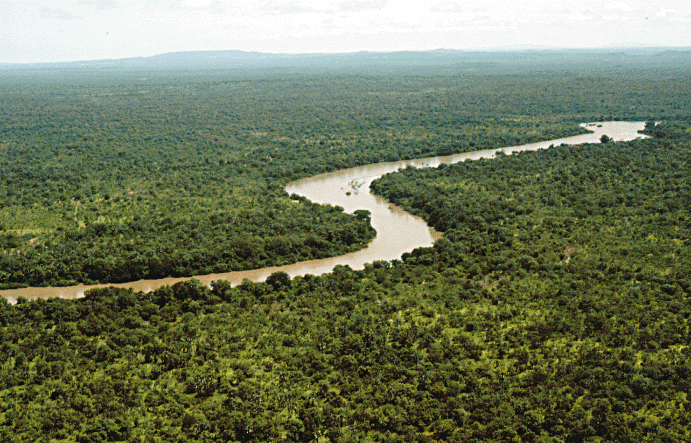
The Gambia River flowing through the Niokolo-Koba National Park

The Niokolo Koba is a river in Senegal. The river is a tributary to the Gambia River, and runs mainly through the Niokolo-Koba National Park.
