= Kanel =

Kanel كانيل
- Town and commune
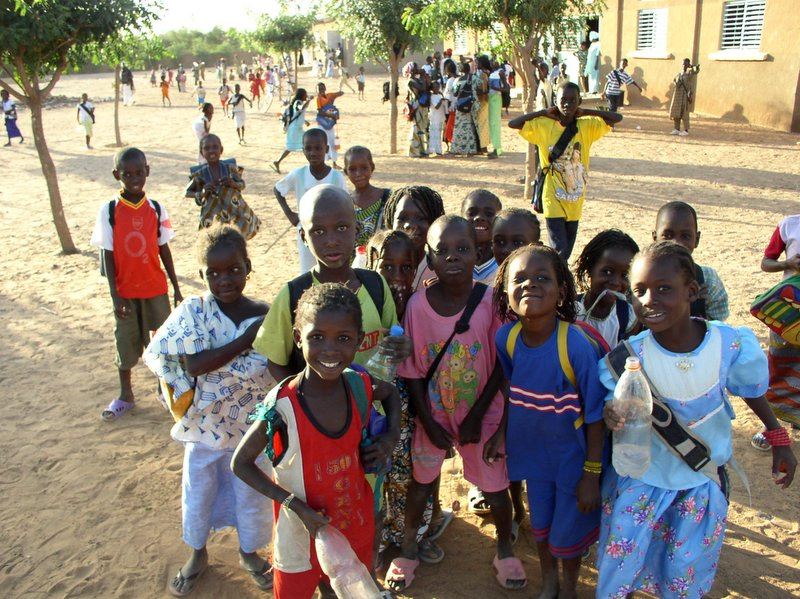
- Pupils in Kanel

- Location within Senegal
- Coordinates: 15°29′N 13°10′W
- Country: Senegal
- Region: Matam Region
- Department: Kanel Department

Area
  - Town and commune: 6.068 km^{2} (2.343 sq mi)

Population (2023 census)
  - Town and commune: 15,244
  - Density: 2,512/km^{2} (6,507/sq mi)
- Time zone: UTC+0 (GMT)

Kanel (Hassaniya Arabic: كانيل) is a town and urban commune in the Matam Region of northeastern Senegal. It is the capital of the Kanel Department. The population in 2023 was 15,244, an increase from the 12,975 counted in 2013.

The town received commune status in 1996. Its climate is typical of the Sahel region
