= Matam region =

Region of Senegal

Matam region Région de Matam (French) Diiwaanu Maatam (Wolof)
- Region
- Location of Matam in Senegal

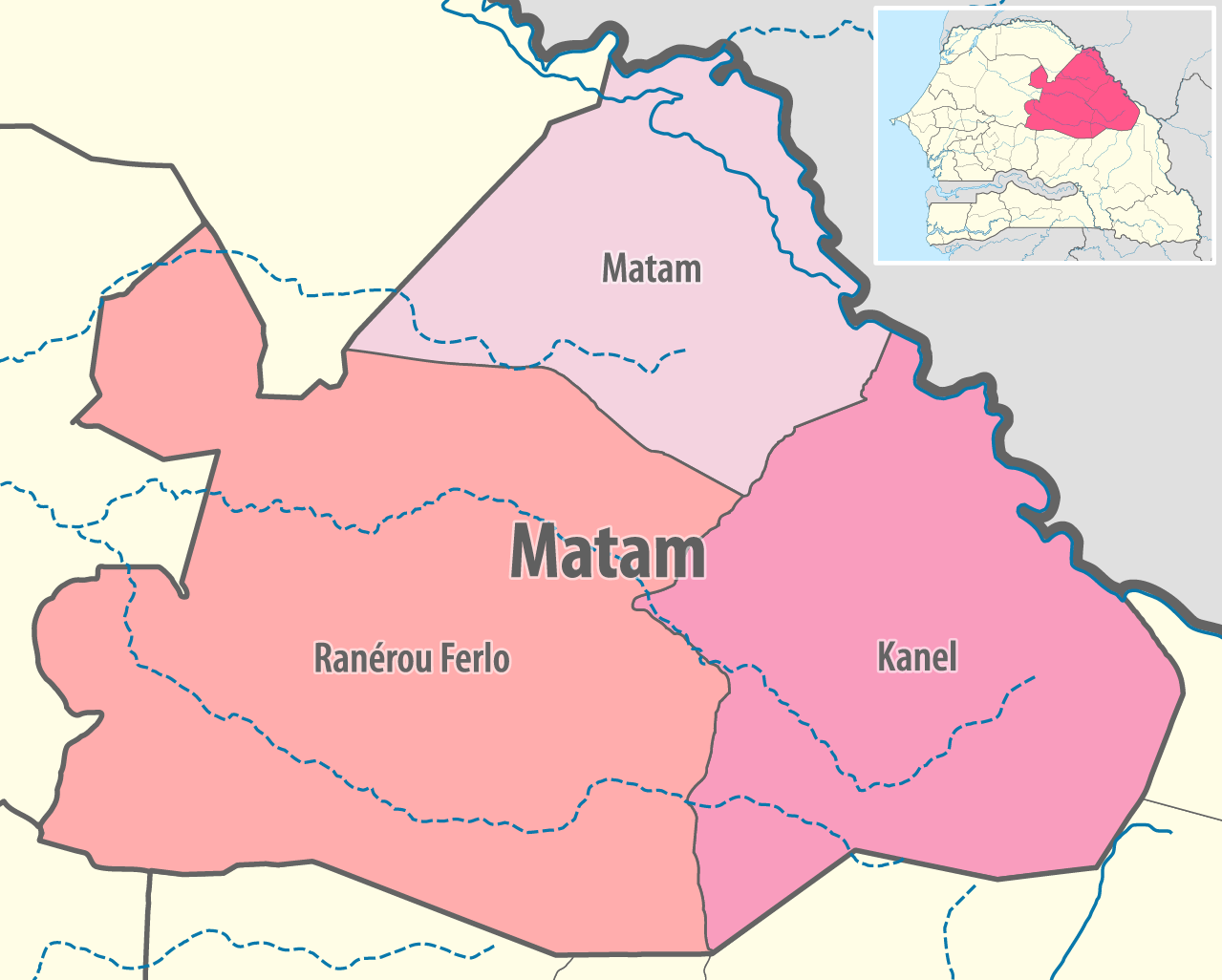
- Matam région, divided into 3 départements
- Coordinates: 15°06′N 13°38′W
- Country: Senegal
- Capital: Matam
- Départements: List: Kanel; Matam; Ranérou Ferlo

Area
  - Total: 29,445 km^{2} (11,369 sq mi)

Population (2023 census)
  - Total: 833,657
  - Density: 28.312/km^{2} (73.329/sq mi)
- Time zone: UTC+0 (GMT)

Matam is a region of Senegal (regional capitals have the same name as their respective regions).

It is a flat, arid region bounded on the north by the Sénégal River and the south by the Sahelian plain studded with baobab trees. Matam is populated by the Pulaar-speaking Toucouleur people. According to a 2015 economic report, half of Senegal's agricultural value is derived from the Matam region.

== Departments ==
Matam region is divided into 3 departments:

- Kanel département
- Matam département
- Ranérou Ferlo département

== Geography ==
Matam is traversed by the northwesterly line of equal latitude and longitude.

== Cities and villages ==
- Agnam-Goly
- Agnam Civol
- Bokidiawé
- Dabia
- Dembancané
- Kanel
- Matam
- Nabadji Civol
- Ogo
- Oréfondé
- Orkadiére
- Ourossogui
- Ranérou
- Semme
- Sinthiou Bamambé
- Thilogne
- Vélingara
- Waoundé
- Diandioly
- Shinthiou Garba
- Fadiara
- Bokiladji
- Hadoubere
- Dembankane
- Yerimale
- Hamady Ounare
- Soringho
- Sinthiane
