= Matam department =

Coordinates: 15°37′03″N 13°19′49″W

Matam
- Department
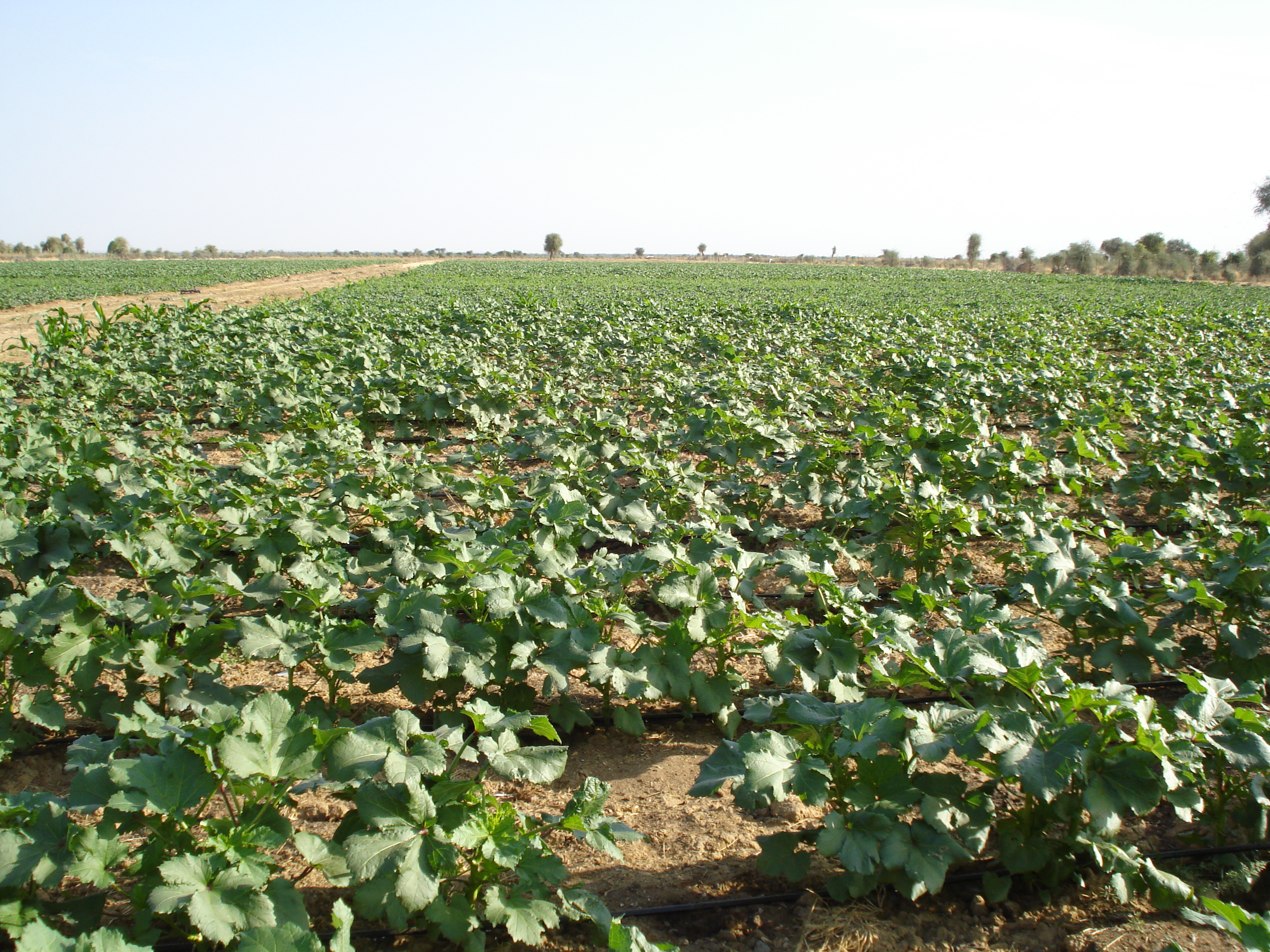

- Location in the Matam region
- Country: Senegal
- Region: Matam region
- Capital: Matam

Population (2023 census)
  - Total: 387,866
- Time zone: UTC+0 (GMT)

Matam department is one of the 46 departments of Senegal, one of the three in the Matam region in the north-east of the country.

== Departments ==
The department has four communes: Matam, Ourossogui, Thilogne and Nguidjilone.

== Districts ==
Rural districts (communautés rurales) comprise:

- Arrondissement of Agnam Civol:
  - Agnam Civol
  - Dabia
  - Oréfondé
- Arrondissement of Ogo:
  - Nabadji Civol
  - Ogo (Matam)
  - Bokidiawé

== Historic sites ==
- Building housing the Government of Matam
- Building housing Matam school
- The Residence of Diorbivol Matam
- The old village of Sinthiou Bara
- The old village of Ogo
