= Matam, Senegal =

Matam ماتام
- Town and commune
- Location within Senegal
- Coordinates: 15°37′N 13°20′W
- Country: Senegal
- Region: Matam
- Department: Matam

Area
  - Town and commune: 6.577 km^{2} (2.539 sq mi)

Population (2023 census)
  - Town and commune: 27,695
  - Density: 4,211/km^{2} (10,910/sq mi)
- Time zone: UTC+0 (GMT)

Matam (Hassaniya Arabic: ماتام; Wolof: Mataam) is the capital town of the Matam Region in north-east Senegal, and lies on the Sénégal River on the border with Mauritania. In the census of 2002, Matam had 14,620 inhabitants and in the 2023 census the population of the town had increased to 27,695.

In 1996, the Upper Senegal River Valley, stretching from Matam to Diamou in Mali was cited as one of the poorest and most inaccessible regions in the western Sahel.

== Mining ==
Matam has phosphate mines in the vicinity.

== Climate ==
Matam has a hot semi-arid climate (BSh in Köppen climate classification), closely bordering on desert climate(BWh), with little to no rainfall in all months except July, August and September.

Climate data for Matam (1991–2020 normals, extremes 1973-present)
Month	Jan	Feb	Mar	Apr	May	Jun	Jul	Aug	Sep	Oct	Nov	Dec	Year
Record high °C (°F)	45.4 (113.7)	48.4 (119.1)	46.2 (115.2)	48.5 (119.3)	48.5 (119.3)	48.0 (118.4)	48.2 (118.8)	45.6 (114.1)	47.0 (116.6)	45.0 (113.0)	46.0 (114.8)	42.5 (108.5)	48.5 (119.3)
Mean daily maximum °C (°F)	33.8 (92.8)	36.6 (97.9)	40.0 (104.0)	42.7 (108.9)	43.7 (110.7)	41.6 (106.9)	37.5 (99.5)	35.4 (95.7)	35.9 (96.6)	39.3 (102.7)	38.3 (100.9)	34.9 (94.8)	38.3 (100.9)
Mean daily minimum °C (°F)	16.4 (61.5)	18.8 (65.8)	21.5 (70.7)	24.8 (76.6)	27.6 (81.7)	27.9 (82.2)	26.0 (78.8)	25.0 (77.0)	24.8 (76.6)	24.8 (76.6)	20.8 (69.4)	17.5 (63.5)	23.0 (73.4)
Record low °C (°F)	9.6 (49.3)	10.0 (50.0)	12.0 (53.6)	16.0 (60.8)	19.0 (66.2)	16.8 (62.2)	18.5 (65.3)	17.4 (63.3)	14.8 (58.6)	18.0 (64.4)	13.6 (56.5)	11.0 (51.8)	9.6 (49.3)
Average precipitation mm (inches)	0.1 (0.00)	0.5 (0.02)	0.1 (0.00)	0.0 (0.0)	2.5 (0.10)	22.4 (0.88)	94.9 (3.74)	147.1 (5.79)	99.0 (3.90)	18.8 (0.74)	0.2 (0.01)	0.0 (0.0)	385.6 (15.18)
Average precipitation days (≥ 1.0 mm)	0.1	0.1	0.0	0.0	0.3	2.5	6.6	8.8	7.5	1.5	0.0	0.0	27.4
Mean monthly sunshine hours	266.6	252.0	291.4	297.0	297.6	270.0	272.8	257.3	252.0	275.9	270.0	176.7	3,179.3
Percentage possible sunshine	77	78	79	80	75	70	69	66	70	77	80	51	73
Source: NOAA (sunshine 1961–1990)

== Notable people ==
- Samba Diouldé Thiam
