= List of World Heritage Sites in Senegal =

Location of World Heritage Sites in Senegal. Red dots represent cultural sites, green dots represent natural sites. Blue dots are the sites of the Bassari Country. Yellow dots are the sites of Senegambian stone circles, two of which are in The Gambia.

The United Nations Educational, Scientific and Cultural Organization (UNESCO) World Heritage Sites are places of importance to cultural or natural heritage as described in the UNESCO World Heritage Convention, established in 1972. Cultural heritage consists of monuments (such as architectural works, monumental sculptures, or inscriptions), groups of buildings, and sites (including archaeological sites). Natural features (consisting of physical and biological formations), geological and physiographical formations (including habitats of threatened species of animals and plants), and natural sites which are important from the point of view of science, conservation, or natural beauty, are defined as natural heritage. Senegal accepted the convention on 13 February 1976. There are seven World Heritage Sites in Senegal, with a further eight on the tentative list.

The first site in Senegal to be inscribed to the list was the Island of Gorée, in 1978. The most recent site listed was the Bassari Country, in 2012. Five sites in Senegal are listed for their cultural and two for their natural properties. The Djoudj National Bird Sanctuary was listed as endangered twice, from 1984 to 1988 and from 2000 to 2006; the first time because of the risks posed by the planned construction of a dam downstream, and a second time because of the spread of the invasive plant Salvinia molesta. Niokolo-Koba National Park was listed as endangered in 2007 because of low mammal populations, management problems, and the planned construction of a dam on the Gambia River upstream. It was removed from the endangered list in 2024 after Senegal had taken several measures to improve the situation. One site, the Stone Circles of Senegambia, is shared with The Gambia. Senegal has served on the World Heritage Committee five times.

== World Heritage Sites ==
UNESCO lists sites under ten criteria; each entry must meet at least one of the criteria. Criteria i through vi are cultural, and vii through x are natural.

* Transnational site

World Heritage Sites
Site	Image	Location (region)	Year listed	UNESCO data	Description
Island of Gorée	A red building with stairs and columns	Dakar	1978	26; vi (cultural)	The island, off the coast from Dakar, was a slave-trading centre on the African coast during the Atlantic slave trade period between the 15th and 19th centuries. At different points in time, it was ruled by the Portuguese, Dutch, English, and finally the French, under whom slavery was abolished. The architecture of the island reflects the mixture of influences. There are elegant houses of slave traders, fortifications, and warehouses where slaves were kept (the House of Slaves pictured).
Djoudj National Bird Sanctuary	Cormorants on a tree	Saint-Louis	1981	26; vii, x (natural)	The wetland, located in the Senegal River delta, is an important habitat for several species of water birds, such as the great white pelican, purple heron, African spoonbill, great egret, night heron, and great cormorant (pictured). They use it either as the first stopover on a trans-Saharan migration route or as a nesting site. Crocodiles and manatees also live in the area. The site has been listed as endangered twice, from 1984 to 1988 and from 2000 to 2006; the first time because of the risks posed by the planned construction of a dam downstream, and a second time because of the spread of the invasive plant Salvinia molesta.
Niokolo-Koba National Park	Savanna scenery with green grass	Tambacounda, Kédougou	1981	153; x (natural)	The park is located along the Gambia River. It comprises different types of habitats, including gallery forest, dry forest, savanna floodplains, and rocky outcrops. The park is rich in plant species and is home to substantial populations of large mammals, including lion, giant eland, African elephant, leopard, African wild dog, and chimpanzee. The site was listed as endangered between 2007 and 2024 because of low mammal populations, management problems, and the planned construction of a dam on the Gambia River upstream.
Island of Saint-Louis	Waterfront with buildings and palm trees, a boat in water	Saint-Louis	2000	956bis; ii, iv (cultural)	The narrow island is located in the mouth of the Senegal River. In the 17th century, the French founded a trading hub there, which later served as the capital of Senegal (from 1872 to 1957) and was an important economic and cultural centre of French West Africa. The city follows a grid plan and the houses are built in a consistent colonial style. There are numerous quays along the shore. One of the landmarks of the island is the Faidherbe Bridge, built in 1897. A minor boundary modification of the site took place in 2007.
Stone Circles of Senegambia*	Several groups of stone circles and some stones scattered around	Kaolack	2006	1226; i, iii (cultural)	This site comprises four megalithic groups of stone circles, Wassu and Kerbatch in The Gambia and Wanar and Sine Ngayène (pictured) in Senegal. Numerous tumuli are also located there, some of which have been excavated. They were associated with funerary practices and were being created over a long period of time, roughly from the 3rd century BCE to the 16th century CE. The stones were quarried from the laterite rock. They are on average 2 m (6 ft 7 in) tall, each circle containing between eight and fourteen of them.
Saloum Delta	Look at the river delta from above	Fatick	2011	1359; iii, iv, v (cultural)	The delta of the Saloum River, protected as a Ramsar site, has been inhabited for at least two millennia. Societies, who practiced fishing and shellfish gathering, have over the centuries created numerous shell mounds, some several hundred metres long. This resulted in a specific cultural landscape, with the mounds stabilizing the delta and its channels. Some mounds are covered by trees and contain funerary sites.
Bassari Country: Bassari, Fula and Bedik Cultural Landscapes	Village scene with houses with thatched roofs and two women working	Kédougou	2012	1407; iii, v, vi (cultural)	This site comprises the Bassari–Salémata area, the Bedik–Bandafassi area (village pictured), and the Fula–Dindéfello area. People living in this remote area between the 11th and 19th centuries created a specific cultural landscape with terraces, paddy fields, villages, and archaeological sites.

== Tentative list ==
In addition to sites inscribed on the World Heritage List, member states can maintain a list of tentative sites that they may consider for nomination. Nominations for the World Heritage List are only accepted if the site was previously listed on the tentative list. Senegal maintains eight properties on its tentative list.

Tentative sites
Site	Image	Location (region)	Year listed	UNESCO criteria	Description
Aéropostale	A historical photo of an airplane	Saint-Louis, Dakar	2005	(cultural)	Aéropostale, a French airmail company, was founded in 1918. The company expanded service to Senegal, and from Senegal to Argentina in 1925. In Senegal, the remains of the service include the airplane bases, a control tower, and several commemorative plates in Saint-Louis and Dakar. A historical plane from 1918 is pictured.
Carabane Island	Side view of a church building	Ziguinchor	2005	(cultural)	Carabane Island is located at the mouth of the Casamance River. The French established a trading post in 1836, which later developed into the regional capital, until being replaced by Ziguinchor in 1904. The island is covered with mangrove, baobab, and palm trees. Colonial buildings from the second half of the 19th century include the Breton-style church (pictured), a penitentiary, buildings of a Catholic mission, and a cemetery.
Rural architecture of Lower Casamance: Houses with an impluvium of the Bandial Kingdom	Interior view of a house with a central impluvium	Ziguinchor	2005	(cultural)	People of the ancient Bandial Kingdom in the Casamance region have developed a special type of architecture, houses with a central impluvium (a central open part of the building, designed to bring light inside and to catch rain, example pictured). To enlarge the building as the family grew, a second impluvium was sometimes created. These earthen buildings were once common in the region, but today only some have been preserved.
Îles de la Madeleine National Park	Look at islands and the coast from above	Dakar	2005	(mixed)	The national park covers two islets off the coast off Dakar. The islets are of cultural importance to the Lebu fishing community and are, according to the tradition, home to the protective spirit of Dakar, Ndoek-Daour. Cliffs reaching 35 m (115 ft) surround the islets. There are also some unusual rock formations.
The stopovers on the Senegal River	A building with arches	Saint-Louis, Matam, Tambacounda	2005	(cultural)	The stopovers on the Senegal River were established by the Europeans to support trade in gum, ivory, skins, and slaves. Initially floating ladders, these stopovers gradually developed into more permanent structures with a quay and commercial facilities. The trade route led to the island of Saint-Louis at the mouth of the river. Some of the more important stopovers include Dagana, Podor (fort pictured), Richard Toll, Salde, and Matam.
Cekeen Tumuli		Diourbel	2005	(cultural)	The tumuli, called mbanaar in the Wolof language, are burial mounds for chiefs. The deceased was placed in his hut with several offerings and the hut was covered with soil. There are over 10,000 such tumuli in Senegal. Some of the most prominent, including one 12 m (39 ft) tall, are located in the village of Cekeen.
Lake Retba	Lake shore with pink lake water	Dakar	2005	(mixed)	Lake Retba is a salt lake with an area of 3 km^{2} (1.2 sq mi) and a maximum depth of 3 m (9.8 ft). It is known for its colour, which ranges between mauve and pink. Salt has been commercially extracted since the 1970s. Often, the lake has served as the finish point of the Dakar Rally.
The old Rufisque	An industrial building with some people in front	Dakar	2005	(cultural)	Located in the Cap-Vert peninsula at a fresh-water river (Rio Fresco), the fishing village of Rufisque got its name in the 16th century. In the second half of the 19th century it developed into one of the major centres of West Africa. One part of the city comprises villas of large merchants while the other part is an agglomeration of the neighborhoods of the Lebu people.
