= Salémata =

- Town and commune
- Location in Senegal
- Coordinates: 12°38′N 12°49′W
- Country: Senegal
- Region: Kédougou
- Department: Salémata

Area
  - Town and commune: 4.526 km^{2} (1.747 sq mi)
- Elevation: 171 m (561 ft)

Population (2023 census)
  - Town and commune: 6,712
  - Density: 1,483/km^{2} (3,841/sq mi)
- Time zone: UTC+0 (GMT)

Salémata is a small town with commune status in south-east Senegal. It is the chief settlement of the Salémata Department in the Kédougou Region. It lies close to the Niokolo-Koba National Park and the Dindefelo Falls, close to the border with Guinea Conakry.

The region is filled with very mixed communities being made up of several ethnic groups such as Bassaris, Peulhs, Bediks...

Most of the population activities consist of agriculture, trade and animal breeding

== Administration ==
The village became a department in 2008 . Before that it was a rural community.

From 2008 to 2012, Kalidou Ba was elected Deputy Mayor. He is a respected teacher and a notable in the area.

Then from 2012 on, Elhadj Mamadou Sall became President of the departmental council and deputy, reelected in both positions five years later. But it was replaced in 2017 by Moussa Souaré due to the application of the law n° 96–11.

In 2015, Kamissa Camara was elected Mayor.

In 2019 its population was recorded at 22,111.
