= Dindefelo =

Dindéfelo Dinndéfélou
- Town
- Location within Senegal
- Coordinates: 12°23′0″N 12°19′0″W
- Country: Senegal
- Region: Kédougou Region
- Department: Kédougou
- Arrondissement: Bandafassi Arrondissement
- Elevation: 405 m (1,329 ft)
- Time zone: UTC+0 (GMT)

Dindéfelo (var. Dinndéfélou) is a village near Segou in southeast Senegal. It is home to the tourist attraction and park at Dindefelo Falls which can be reached by following a creek-side trail to the south. The town is 38 km southeast of Kedougou, 6 km from the town of Segou Senegal, and was historically a part of Kedougou kingdom in the Senegalese foothills of the Fouta Djallon mountains. The region is traditionally home to the Bassari people.
