= Bassari Country =

Bassari Country: Bassari, Fula and Bedik Cultural Landscapes
UNESCO World Heritage Site
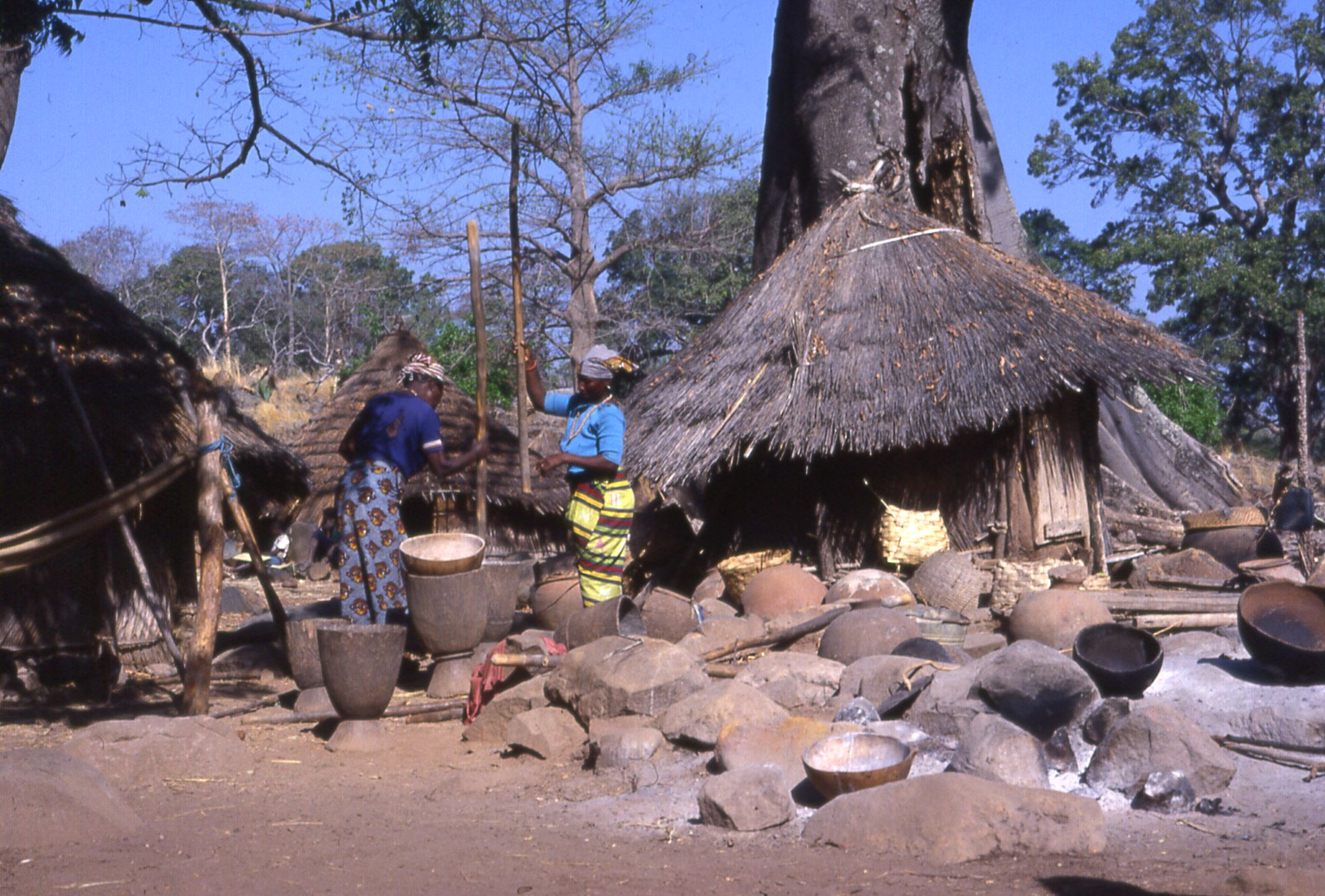
- Bedik village

- Location within Senegal
- Location: Senegal
- Includes: 1. Bassari Salémata; 2. Bédik Bandafassi; 3. Peul Dindéfello
- Criteria: Cultural: (iii), (v), (vi)
- Reference: 1407
- Inscription: 2012 (36th Session)
- Area: 503.09 km^{2} (124,316 acres)
- Buffer zone: 2,407.56 km^{2} (594,921 acres)
- Coordinates: 12°35′36″N 12°50′45″W

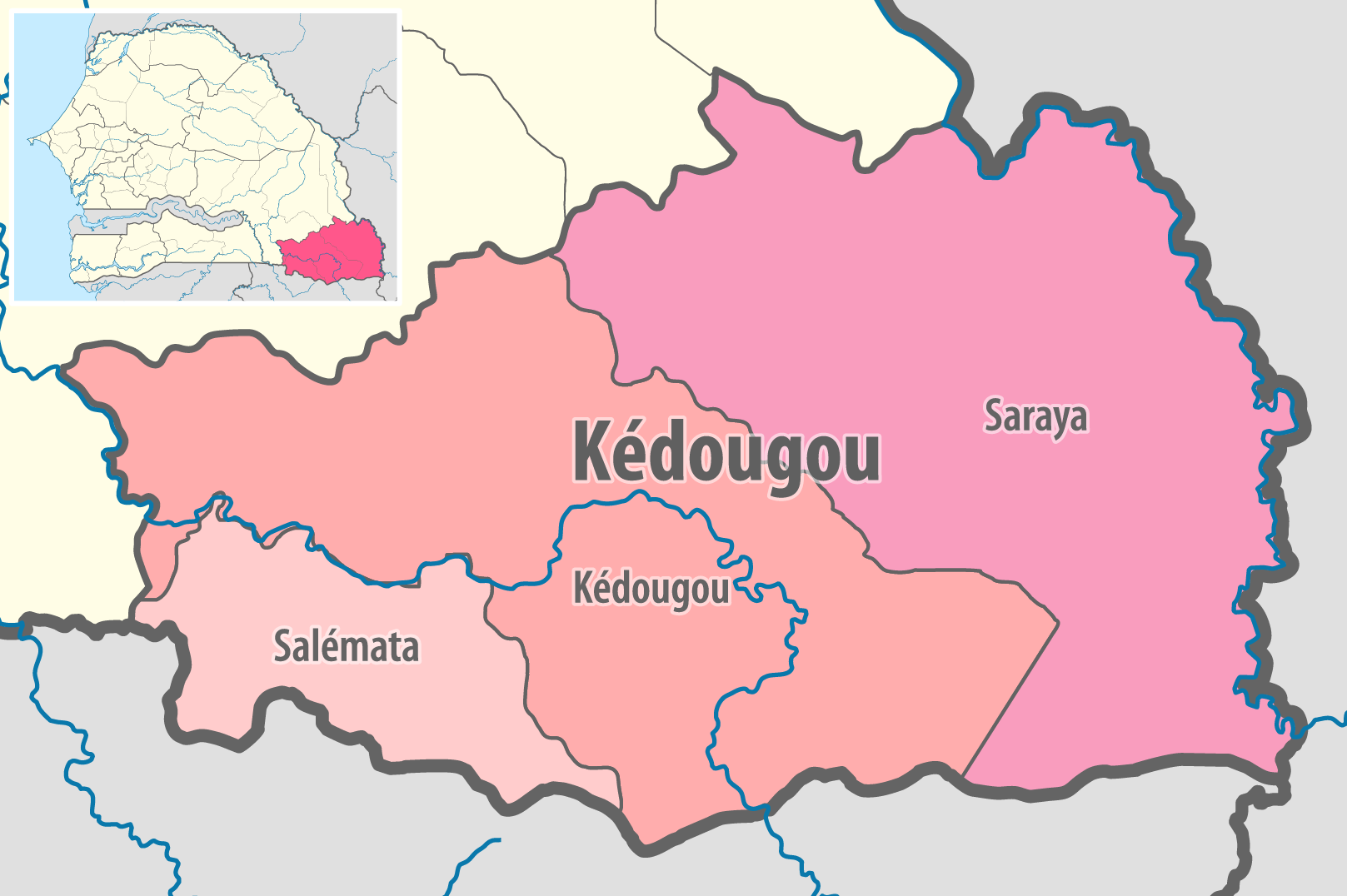
Map of Kédougou Region; Bassari, Fula and Bedik Country are located in the Salémata Department and Kédougou Department.

The Bassari Country (French: Pays Bassari) and its Bassari, Fula and Bedik Cultural Landscapes (Paysages culturels Bassari, Peul et Bédik), located in the southeast of Senegal, is a well-preserved multicultural landscape which emerged from the interaction of human activities and the natural environment. It aggregates three geographical areas: the Bassari–Salémata area, the Bedik–Bandafassi area and the Fula–Dindéfello area, each one with its specific morphological characteristics.

In 2012, the Bassari Country with its Bassari, Fula and Bedik Cultural Landscapes was added to the UNESCO list of World Heritage Sites.

== See also ==
- Bassari people
- Fula people
- Bedick people
