= Saraya, Senegal =

Saraya
- Town and commune
- Location in Senegal
- Coordinates: 12°50′N 11°45′W
- Country: Senegal
- Region: Kédougou
- Department: Saraya

Area
  - Town and commune: 1.748 km^{2} (0.675 sq mi)

Population (2023 census)
  - Town and commune: 4,385
  - Density: 2,509/km^{2} (6,497/sq mi)
- Time zone: UTC+0 (GMT)

Saraya is a small town with commune status in southeast Senegal. It is the chief settlement of Saraya Department in Kédougou Region.

In 2013 its population was recorded at 2,726.
