= Ségou, Senegal =

Coordinates: 12.41°N 12.28°W

Segou is a village in the Kédougou Region of south-eastern Senegal at 12.41 degrees N latitude and 12.28 degrees W longitude. It is 25 km from the region capital of Kédougou and 120 km from Niokolo-Koba National Park. It is in the foothills of the Guinea mountains. It has a population of about 1,000. Nearly all of the people of the village are Pula Futa.

== Segou Waterfall ==
A 3 km hike from the village takes one through farmed fields, savana, bamboo forest, and riparian areas before arriving at the 20 meter waterfall. On the hike, one can expect to see or hear, a variety of birds, chimpanzees, and three monkey species.

== Transportation ==
From Dakar, an overnight bus can be taken to Kedougou on Tuesdays and Fridays. From the Kedougou garage, one can take a sept-place to Segou.

== Accommodations ==
The Luro Pelle Lodge is located just outside the village on the way to the Segou Waterfall. It is open to the public year-round and serves meals, cold beverages, and has solar electricity in all rooms. Staff at the campement can arrange for a guide. 15% of profits are shared with the community.
