= Bandafassi Arrondissement =

- Arrondissement
- Interactive map of Bandafassi Arrondissement
- Country: Senegal
- Region: Kédougou Region
- Department: Kédougou Department
- Time zone: UTC±00:00 (GMT)

Bandafassi Arrondissement is an arrondissement of the Kédougou Department in the Kédougou Region of Senegal.

== Subdivisions ==
The arrondissement is divided administratively into rural communities and in turn into villages.
