= Dakateli (arrondissement) =

- Arrondissement
- Location within Senegal
- Country: Senegal

Dakateli is an arrondissement of Salemata in Kédougou Region in Senegal.
