= Dar Salam (arrondissement) =

- Arrondissement
- Location within Senegal
- Country: Senegal

Dar Salam is an arrondissement of Salemata in Kédougou Region in Senegal.
