= Kédougou =

Town in Senegal

- Town
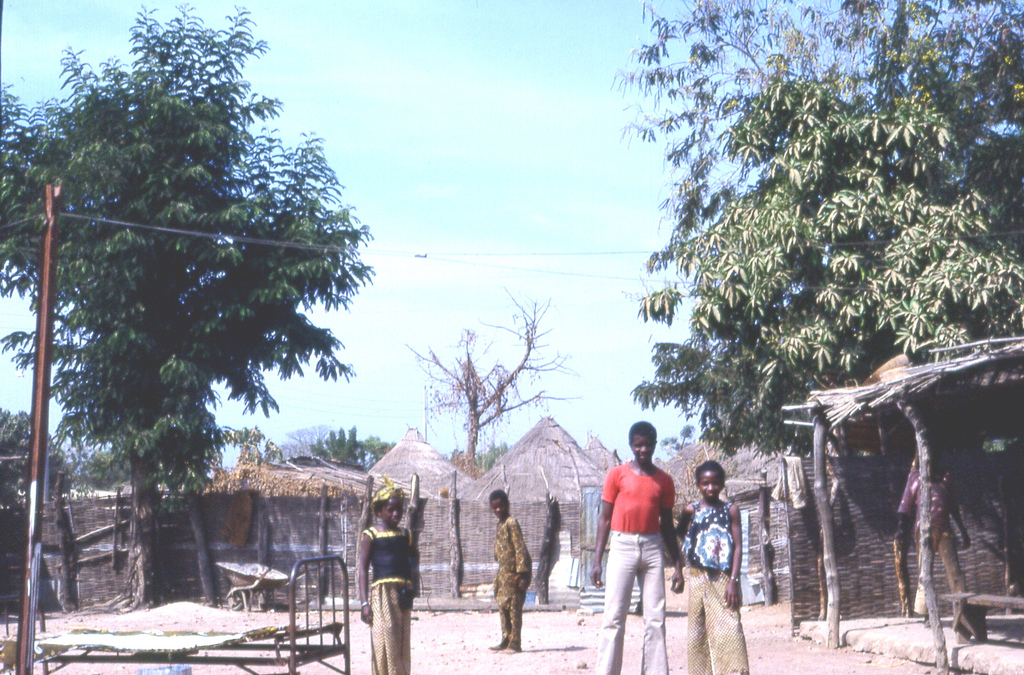
- Kédougou in 1981

- Location in Senegal
- Coordinates: 12°33′00″N 12°11′00″W
- Country: Senegal
- Region: Kédougou
- Department: Kédougou
- Elevation: 167 m (548 ft)

Population (2007)
  - Total: 18,860
- Time zone: UTC+0 (GMT)

Kédougou (Wolof: Keédugu) is a town in the Kédougou Region of south-eastern Senegal near the border with Mali and Guinea. It lies at an elevation of 167 m (548 ft) above sea level.

Founded by the Malinké people, Kédougou means the "Land of Man". The town lies on the N7 road and the River Gambia amid the Pays Bassari hills and Fouta Djallon foothills. Local attractions include the Dindefelo Falls and Niokolo-Koba National Park. The main sources of income in the town are agriculture, small-scale commerce, construction, and gold mining. There is a military camp, a hospital, a community radio station and library, a Peace Corps Office and a number of small businesses. The most commonly spoken languages are Pulaar, Bassari, Bedik, Diakhanké, Malinké and French.

In 2007, according to official estimates, Kédougou had a population of 18,860. That figure had grown to 59,231 in the 2023 census.

== Transport ==
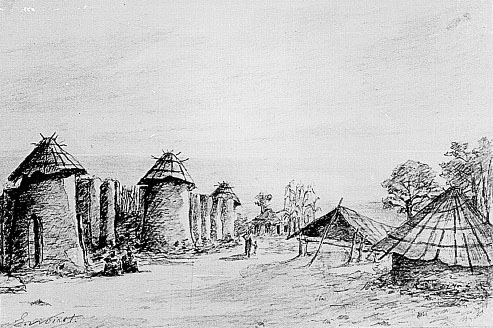
The tata of Kédougou (1881)

A proposed railway branching off the existing line at Tambacounda would serve this town.

== Mining ==
The gold-mining industry has brought several large-scale foreign mining companies to the Kédougou area. This has been a source of tension with some local residents, who point to a lack of jobs available to locals. In late 2008, protests over the practices of gold mines in the region turned violent. On 23 December 2008, a protest march culminated in the burning of government buildings and the security forces firing on demonstrators. The next several days saw widespread destruction of property, looting, and according to a Senegalese human rights group, the mass arrest and torture of suspects. There were also reports that many residents fled the town, some as far as Guinea. Security forces reported one dead, 23 civilians and 10 gendarmes wounded.

== Climate ==
Kédougou has a tropical savanna climate (Köppen Aw) featuring hot to sweltering, rainless winters and hot, rainy summers.

Climate data for Kédougou, Senegal (1981-2010 normals, extremes 1973-2007)
Month	Jan	Feb	Mar	Apr	May	Jun	Jul	Aug	Sep	Oct	Nov	Dec	Year
Record high °C (°F)	40.2 (104.4)	40.7 (105.3)	45.0 (113.0)	46.4 (115.5)	44.0 (111.2)	42.5 (108.5)	38.5 (101.3)	38.6 (101.5)	36.8 (98.2)	37.8 (100.0)	38.5 (101.3)	39.1 (102.4)	46.4 (115.5)
Mean daily maximum °C (°F)	34.2 (93.6)	37.2 (99.0)	39.1 (102.4)	40.4 (104.7)	38.9 (102.0)	34.8 (94.6)	31.8 (89.2)	31.3 (88.3)	32.0 (89.6)	34.0 (93.2)	35.3 (95.5)	33.9 (93.0)	35.2 (95.4)
Daily mean °C (°F)	25.9 (78.6)	29.0 (84.2)	31.4 (88.5)	33.4 (92.1)	32.5 (90.5)	29.3 (84.7)	26.9 (80.4)	26.6 (79.9)	26.6 (79.9)	27.8 (82.0)	27.3 (81.1)	25.4 (77.7)	28.5 (83.3)
Mean daily minimum °C (°F)	17.6 (63.7)	20.7 (69.3)	23.6 (74.5)	26.3 (79.3)	26.1 (79.0)	23.7 (74.7)	21.9 (71.4)	21.8 (71.2)	21.2 (70.2)	21.6 (70.9)	19.3 (66.7)	16.9 (62.4)	21.7 (71.1)
Record low °C (°F)	12.0 (53.6)	13.5 (56.3)	17.2 (63.0)	18.2 (64.8)	19.2 (66.6)	17.5 (63.5)	17.2 (63.0)	17.0 (62.6)	16.7 (62.1)	17.3 (63.1)	11.2 (52.2)	9.6 (49.3)	9.6 (49.3)
Average precipitation mm (inches)	0.4 (0.02)	0.1 (0.00)	1.6 (0.06)	4.1 (0.16)	53.7 (2.11)	153.2 (6.03)	260.4 (10.25)	317.9 (12.52)	280.0 (11.02)	96.2 (3.79)	5.6 (0.22)	0.3 (0.01)	1,173.5 (46.19)
Average precipitation days (≥ 1 mm)	0	0	0	1	6	13	18	20	19	8	1	0	86
Average relative humidity (%)	27	26	25	29	44	66	79	82	82	78	56	35	52
Mean monthly sunshine hours	269.7	249.2	272.8	267.0	266.6	240.0	217.0	201.5	219.0	244.9	258.0	257.3	2,963
Percentage possible sunshine	77	77	74	72	68	63	55	52	61	68	75	74	68
Source 1: WMO
Source 2: NOAA (sunshine 1961–1990) DWD (extremes, humidity 1968–1988)

== See also ==
- Transport in Senegal
