= Saraya department =

Department and arrondissement in Senegal

Coordinates: 12°49′54″N 11°45′14″W

Saraya
- Department and arrondissement
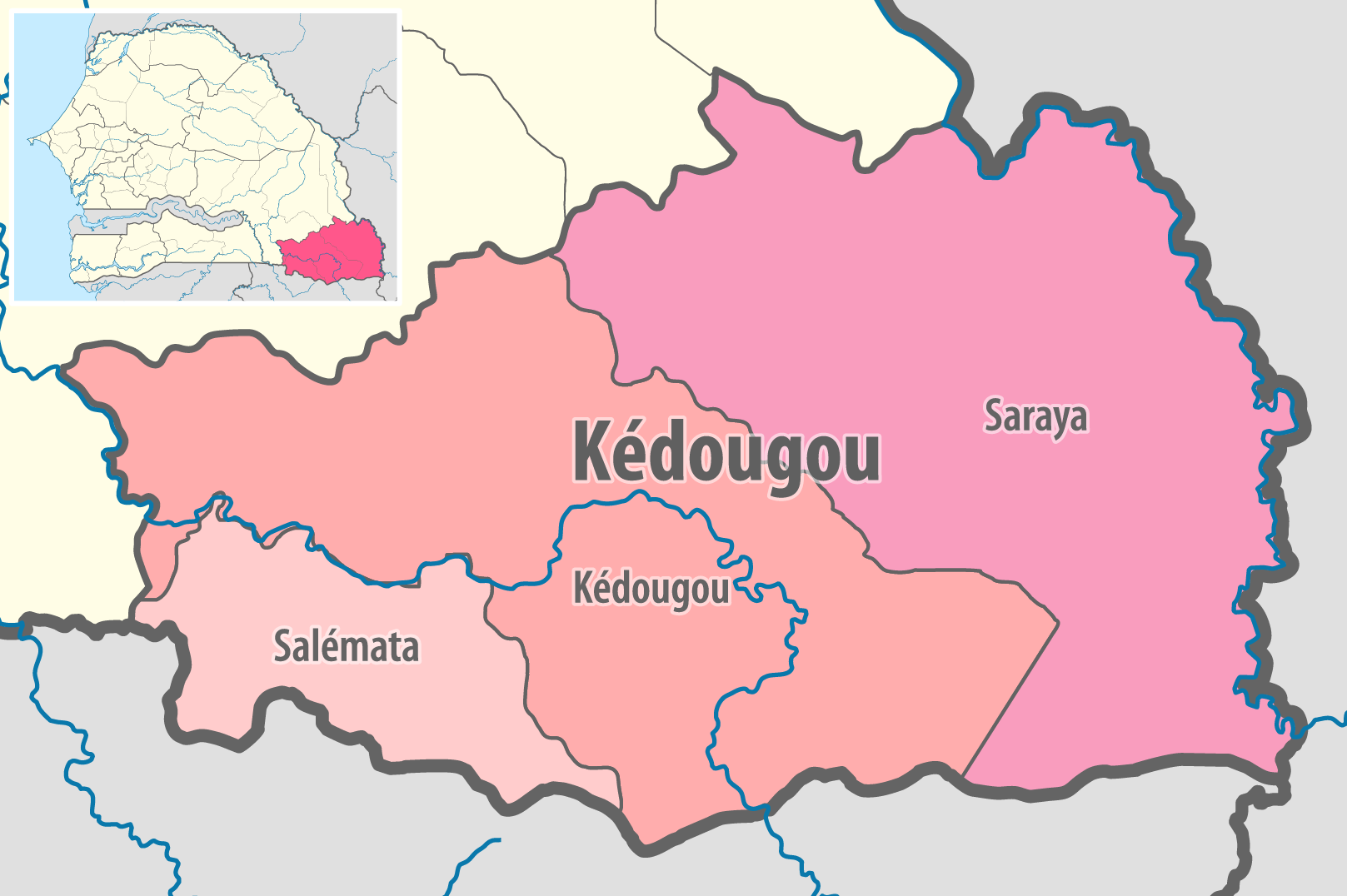
- Location in the Kédougou region
- Country: Senegal
- Region: Kédougou region
- Capital: Saraya
- Established: 2008

Area
  - Total: 7,433 km^{2} (2,870 sq mi)

Population (2023 census)
  - Total: 92,912
  - Density: 12.50/km^{2} (32.37/sq mi)
- Time zone: UTC±00:00 (GMT)

Saraya department is one of the 46 departments of Senegal, one of the three making up the Kédougou region. It was created as part of the new region in 2008.

The chief settlement and only commune is Saraya.

Rural districts (communautés rurales) comprise:

- Arrondissement of Bembou
  - Bembou
  - Médina Baffé
- Arrondissement of Sabodala
  - Sabodala
  - Khossanto
  - Missirah Sirimana
