= Bandafassi =

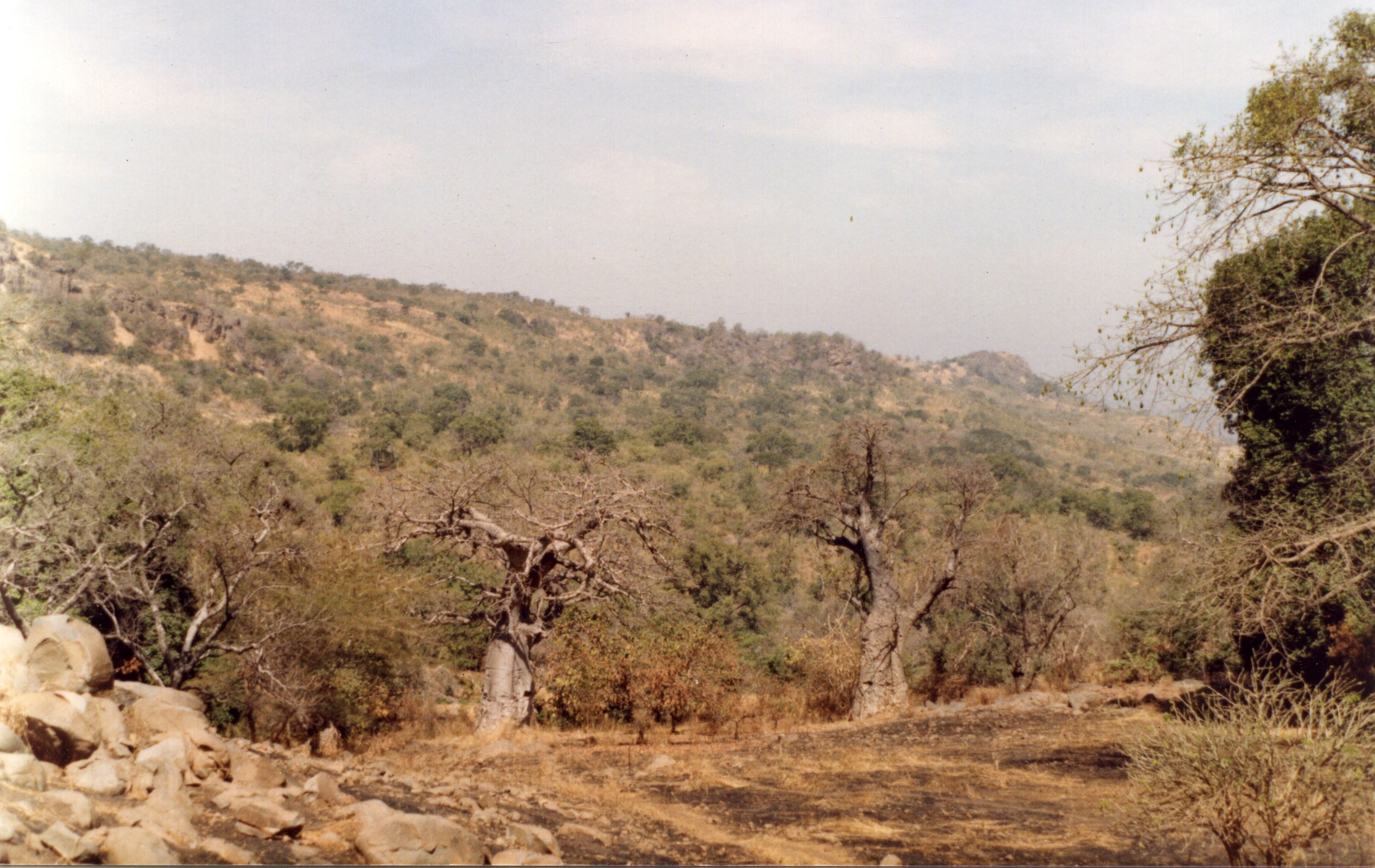

- Location in Senegal
- Coordinates: 12°19′N 12°19′W
- Country: Senegal
- Region: Tambacounda Region
- Department: Kédougou Department

Bandafassi is a town in south-eastern Senegal about 750 km (470 mi) from Dakar near the borders with Mali and Guinea. It constitutes about half of the territory of the Arrondissement of Bandafassi of the Kédougou Department, eastern Senegal, The area constitutes the Bandafassi DSS (demographics surveillance site) of the INDEPTH Network.

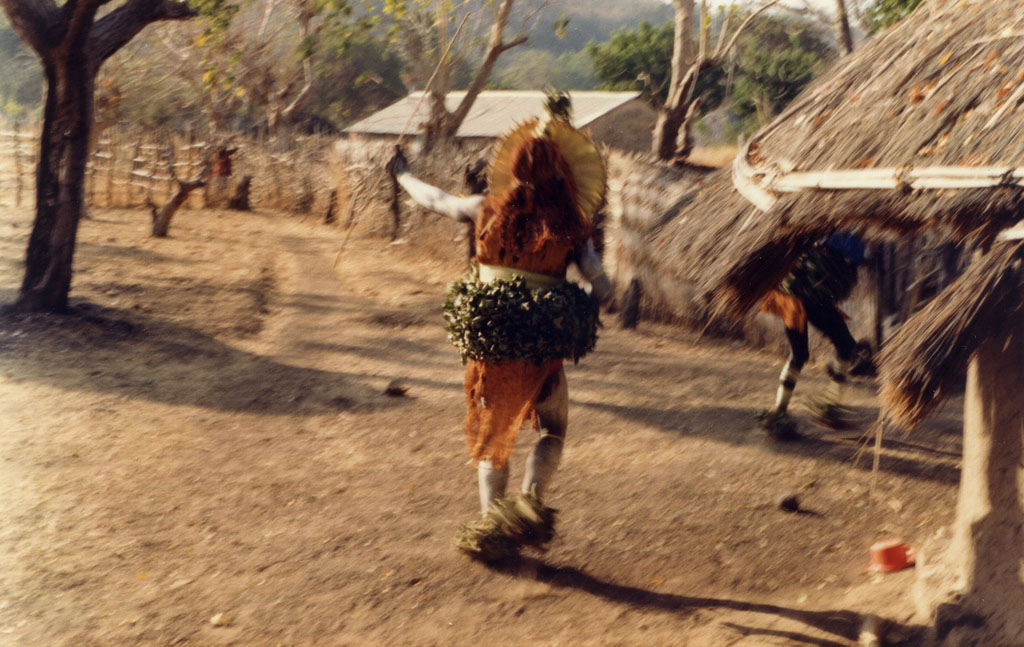
A dancer at a ceremony in 1982

The population includes ethnic groups Bedick (Bedik), Mandinka and Fula Bande.

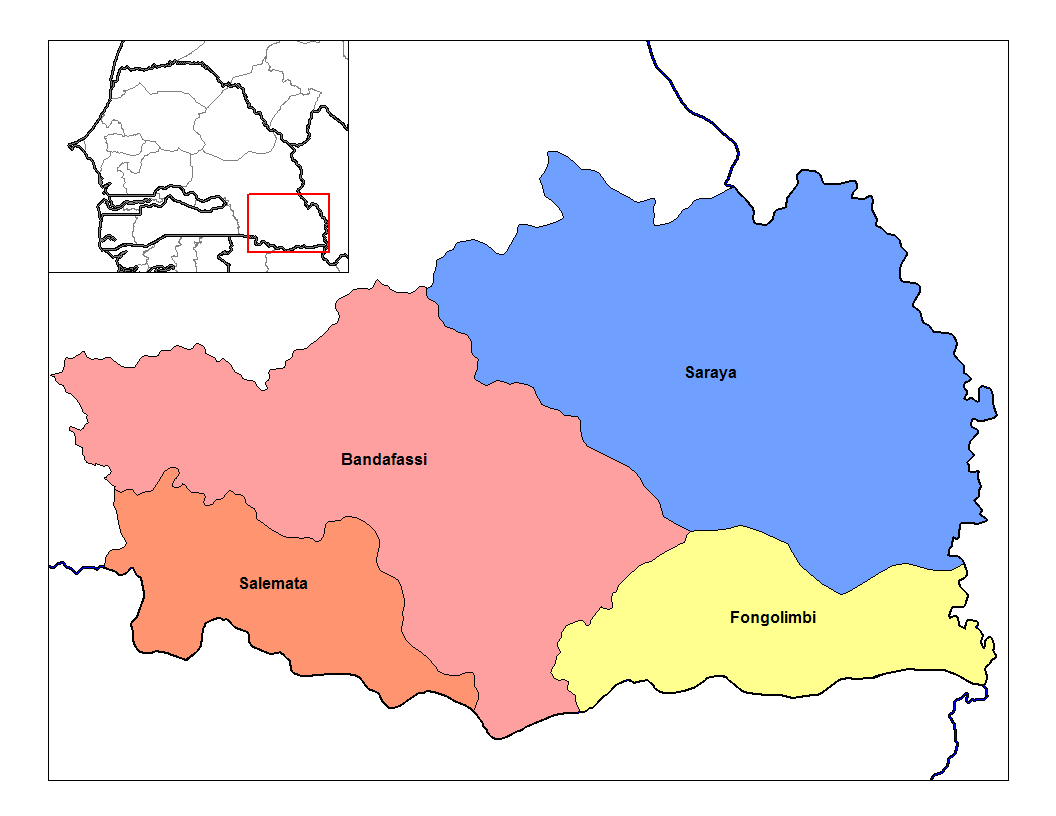
Arrondissements of Kédougou
