= Kédougou department =

Coordinates: 12°33′28″N 12°10′27″W

Kédougou
- Department
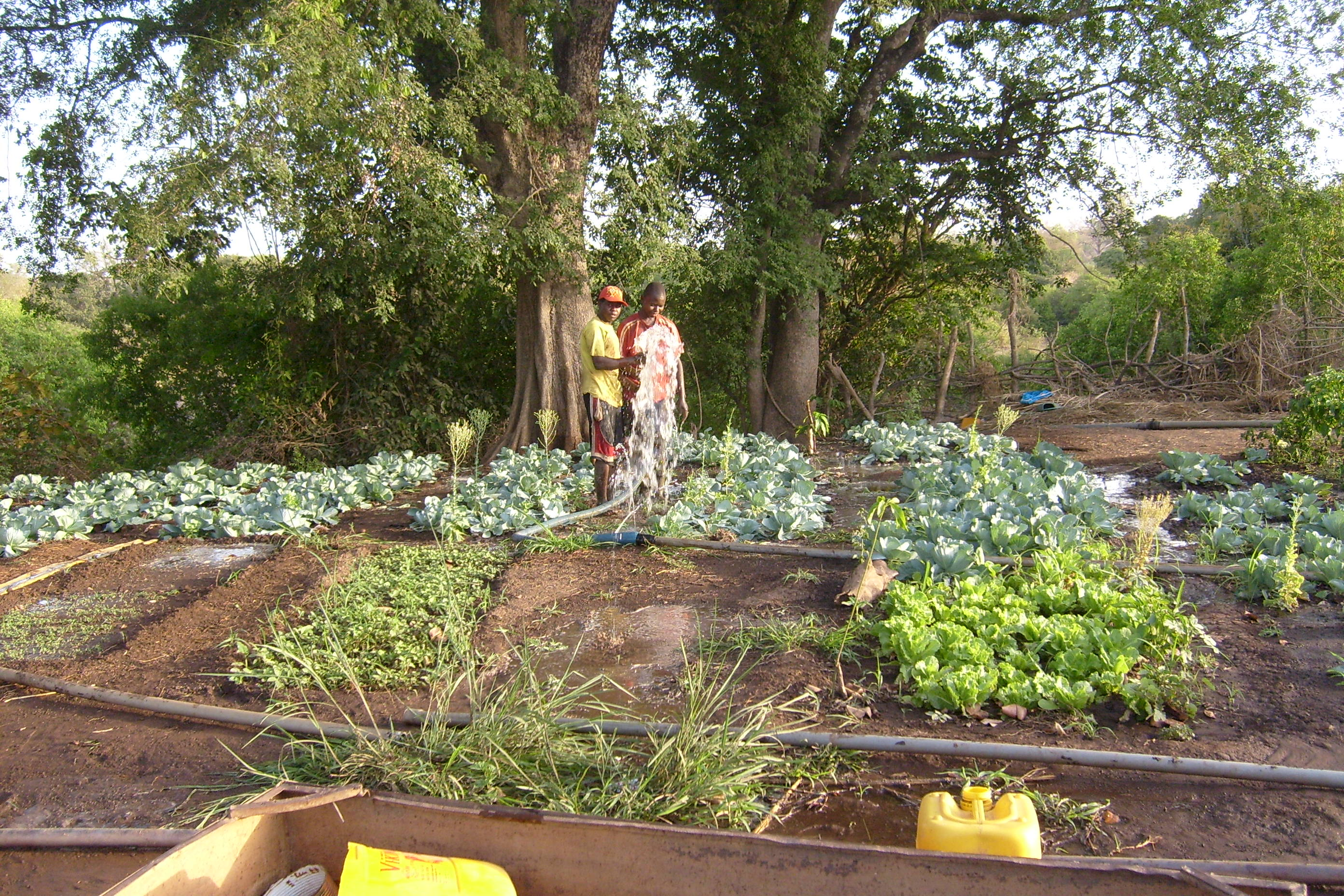

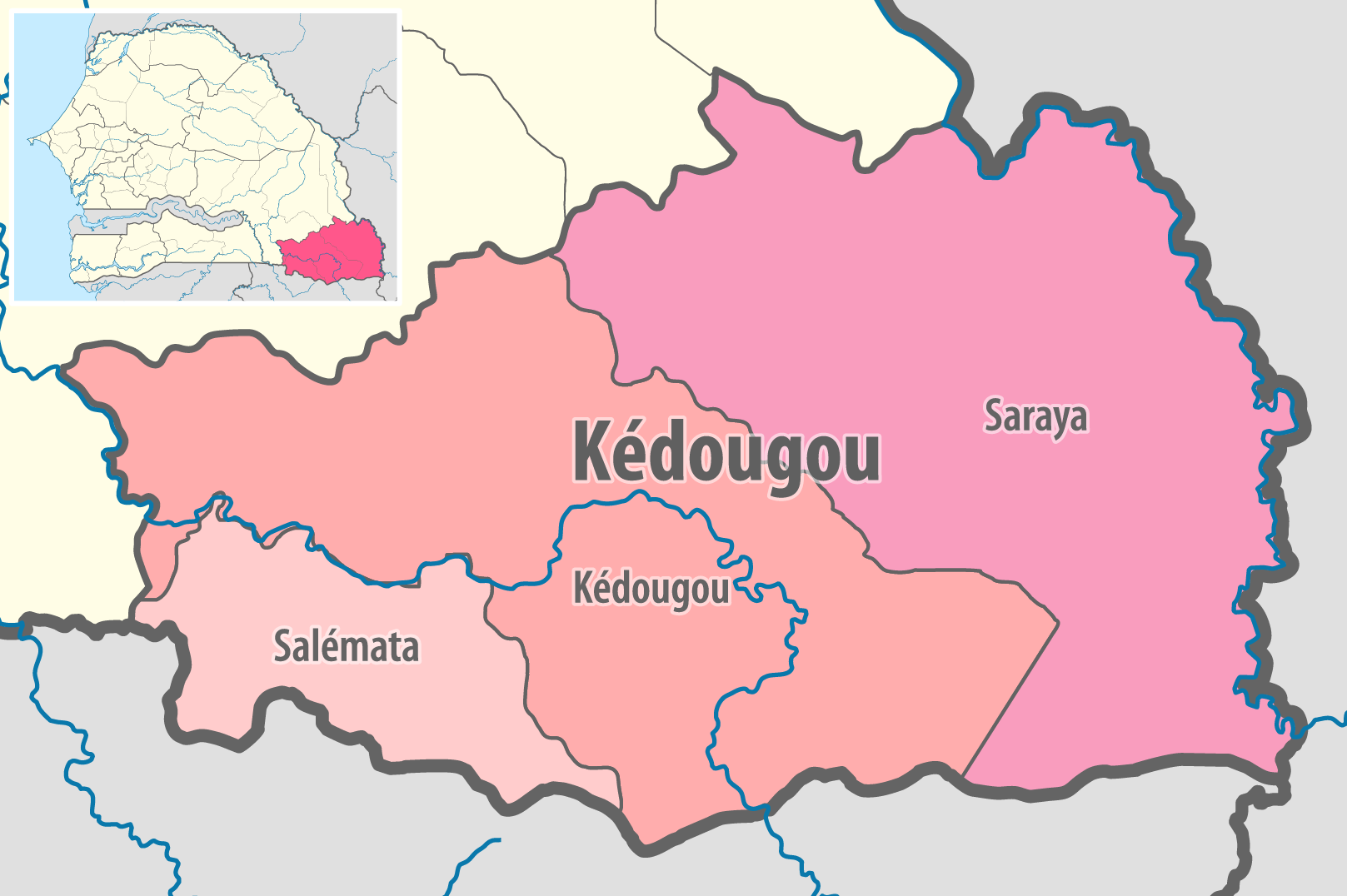
- Location in the Kédougou region
- Country: Senegal
- Region: Kédougou region
- Capital: Kédougou

Area
  - Total: 16,896 km^{2} (6,524 sq mi)

Population (2023 census)
  - Total: 124,265
  - Density: 7.3547/km^{2} (19.049/sq mi)
- Time zone: UTC+0 (GMT)

Kédougou department is one of the 46 departments of Senegal, located in the Kédougou region, formerly part of the Tambacounda region.

The chief settlement and only commune is Kédougou.

The rural districts (communautés rurales) comprise:

- Arrondissement of Bandafassi:
  - Ninéfécha
  - Bandafassi
  - Tomboroncoto
  - Dindefelo
- Arrondissement of Fongolimbi:
  - Fongolimbi
  - Dimboli

== Historic sites ==
- Dindefelo Falls, natural site
- Site of Iwol at Bandafassi, up the mountain, the "Place of silence"
- Bassari Country
