= Salémata department =

Coordinates: 12°37′43″N 12°49′00″W

Salémata
- Department and arrondissement
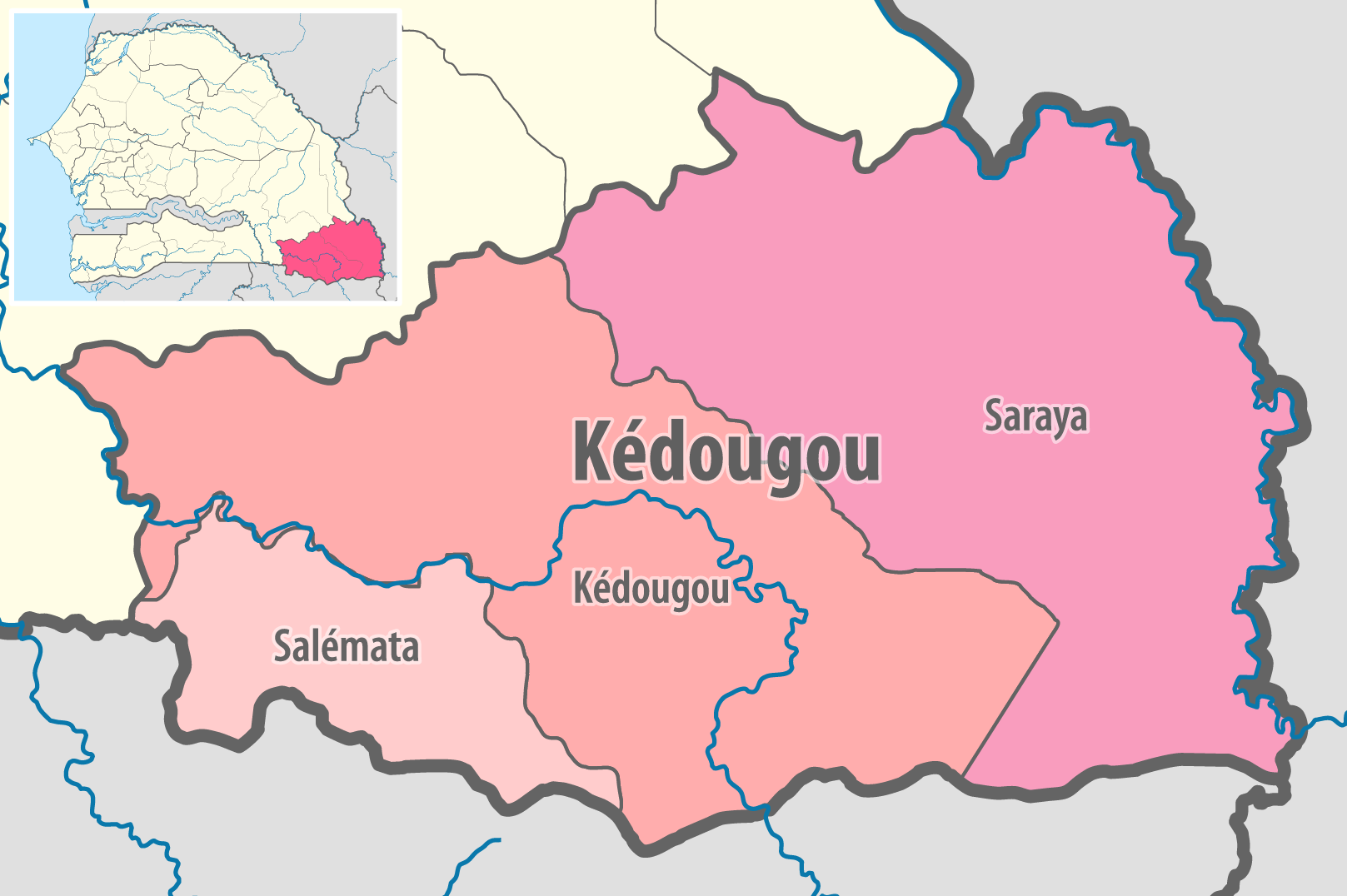
- Location in the Kédougou region
- Country: Senegal
- Region: Kédougou region
- Capital: Salémata
- Established: 2008

Area
  - Total: 1,963 km^{2} (758 sq mi)

Population (2023 census)
  - Total: 28,111
  - Density: 14.32/km^{2} (37.09/sq mi)
- Time zone: UTC±00:00 (GMT)

Salémata department is one of the 46 departments of Senegal, located in the Kédougou region. It was created as part of the new region in 2008.

The chief settlement and only commune in the department is Salémata.

The rural districts (communautés rurales) are as follows:

- Arrondissement of Dakateli:
  - Dakateli
  - Kévoye
- Arrondissement of Dar Salam
  - Dar Salam
  - Ethiolo
  - Oubadji
