= Dindefelo Falls =

Waterfall in Dindefelo, Senegal

Coordinates: 12°23′50″N 12°18′42″W

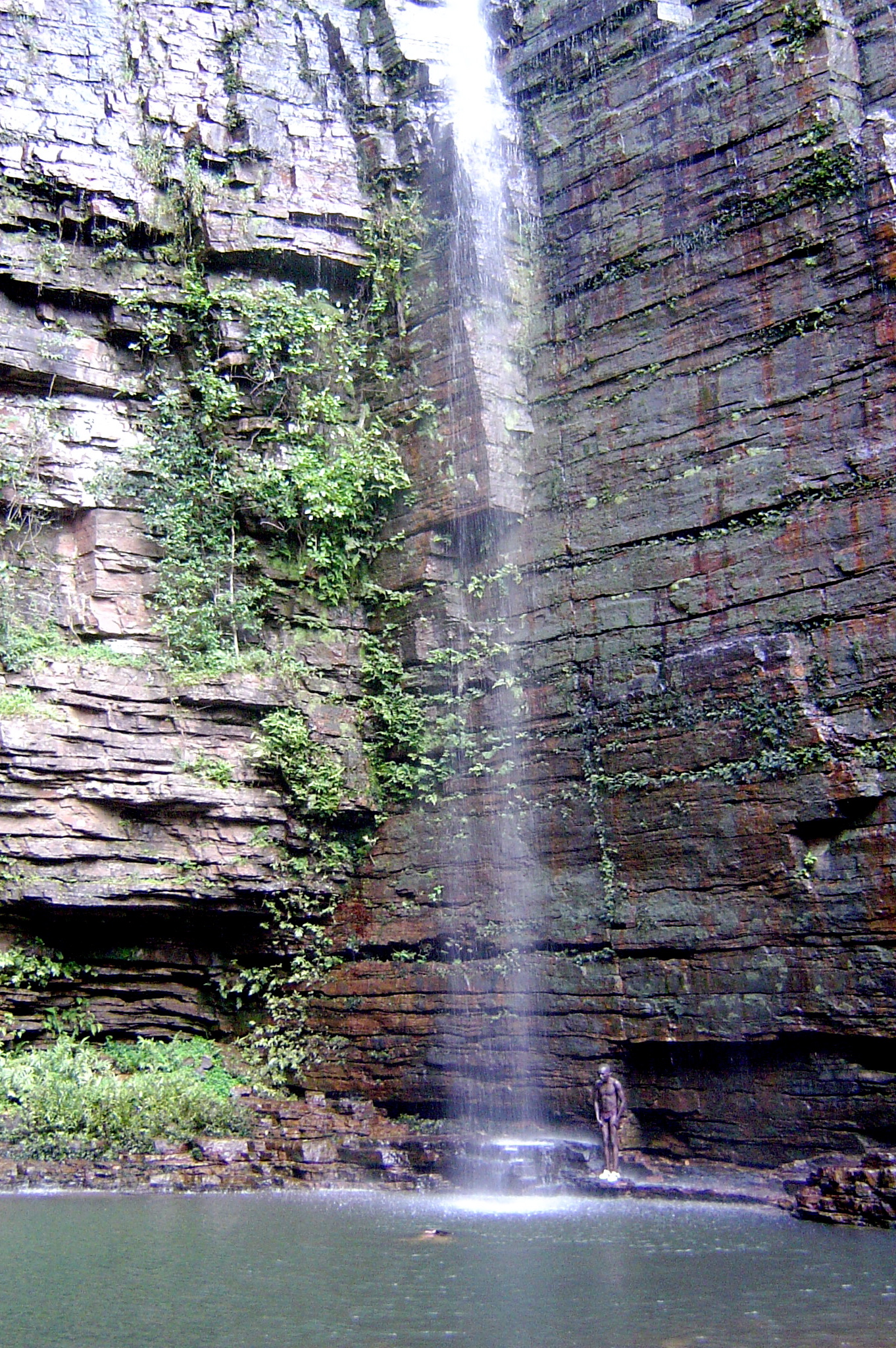
The Dindefelo Falls.

Dindefelo Falls, located in the town of Dindefelo, is a tourist attraction and park in southeast Senegal. It is located just a few miles from the Guinean border. The falls are about 100 meters high.

It forms part of the Bassari Country UNESCO World Heritage Site.
