= Bedick people =

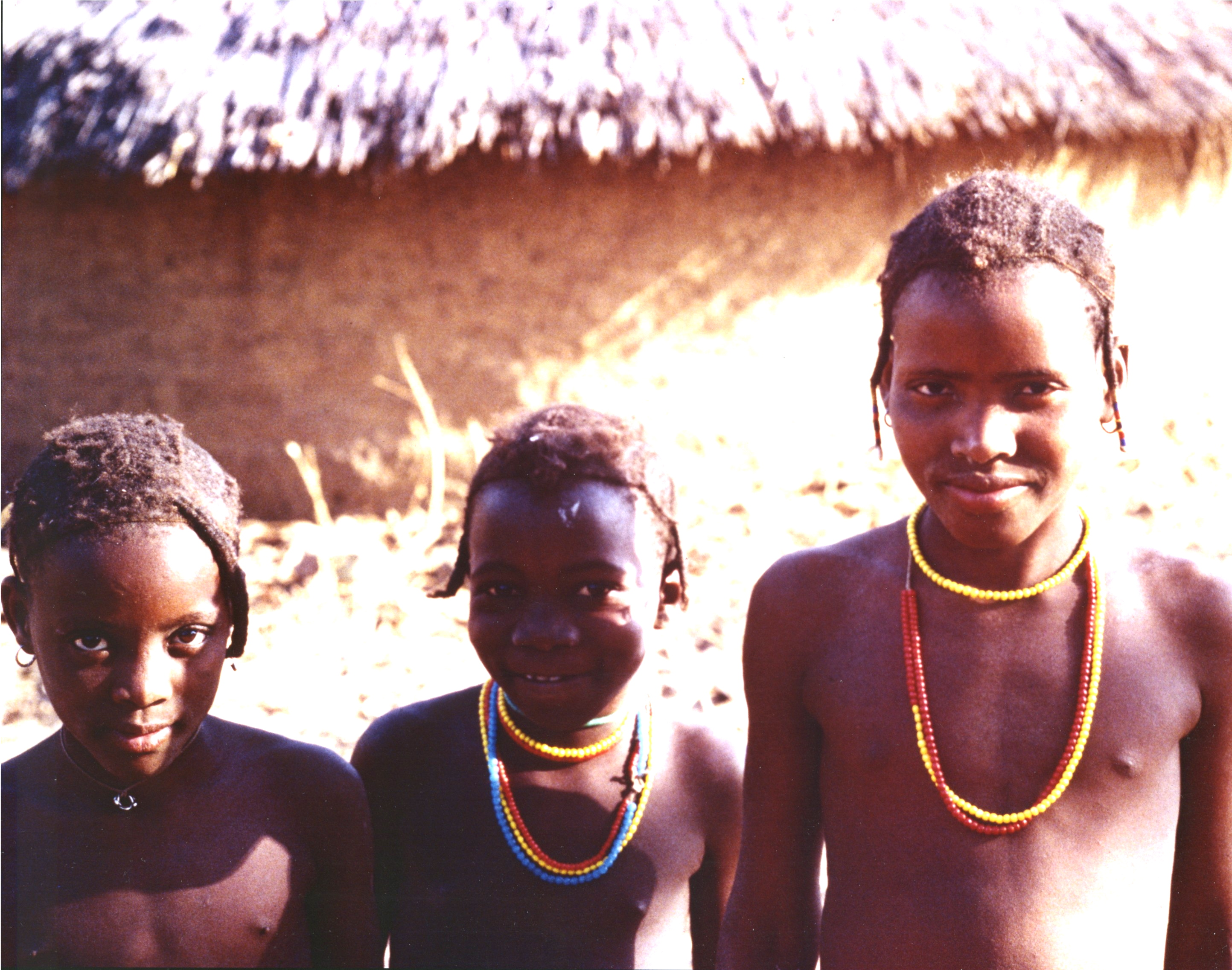
- Bedik girls, Iwol, Senegal

Total population
- 6100

Regions with significant populations
- Senegal: 6100

Languages
- Bedik language

Religion
- Traditional African religions, Christianity

The Bedick, or Bedik, are a minority ethnic group of Africa. They live in villages in the most isolated area of eastern Senegal, in the Arrondissement of Bandafassi. Iwol is one of their settlements.

The Bedick speak the Bedik language and their religion is a blend between their animist roots and a more recent Christian influence. More connected with Guinea Conakry or Mali than with Senegal, Bedick people have contact with other ethnic groups like Bassari and Serer. Their ancestors are the families Keita and Camera that came from Mali because of the War led by Alpha Yaye coming from Fouta Djalon.

== Gallery ==
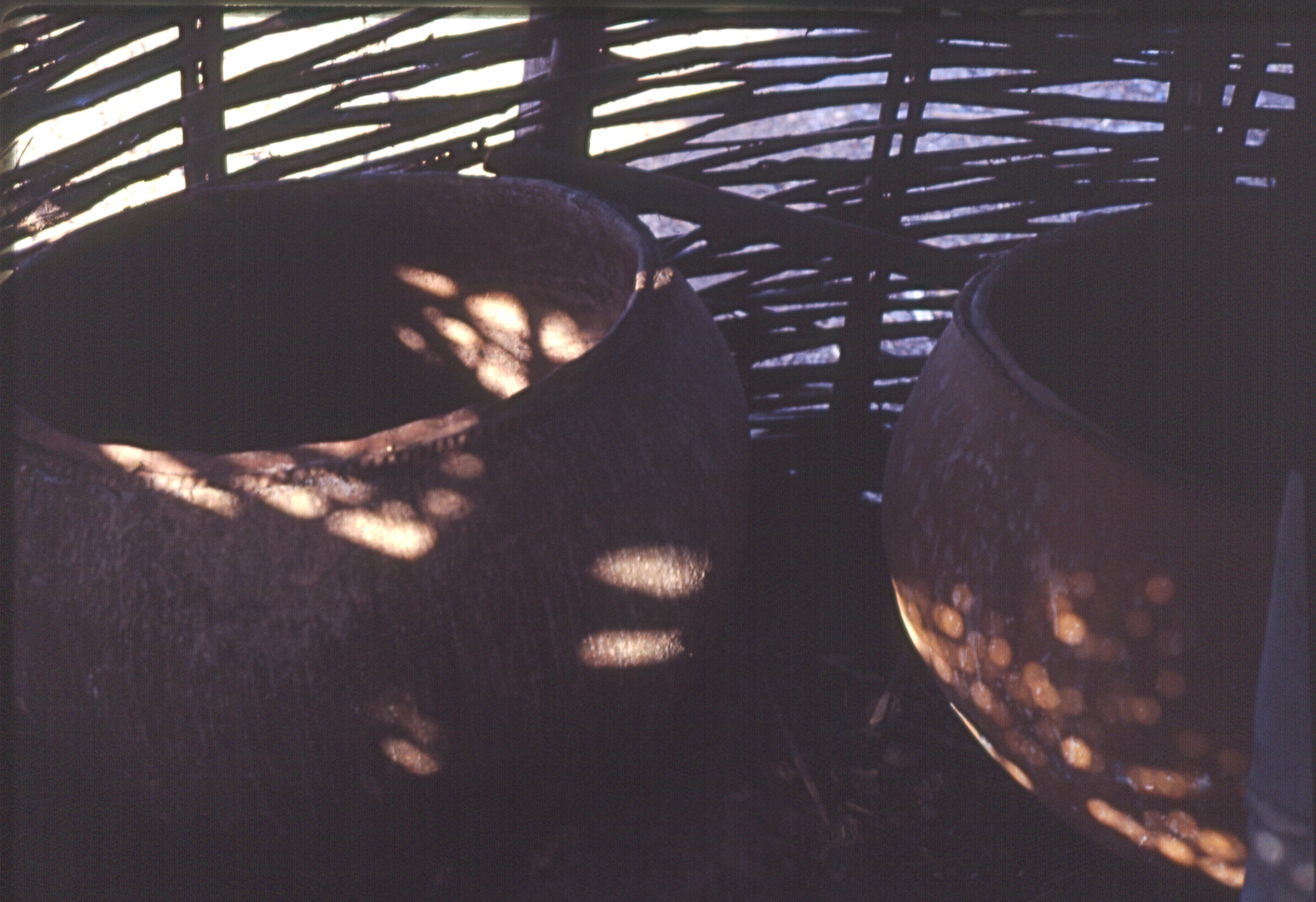
Bedick ceramic pots in storage.

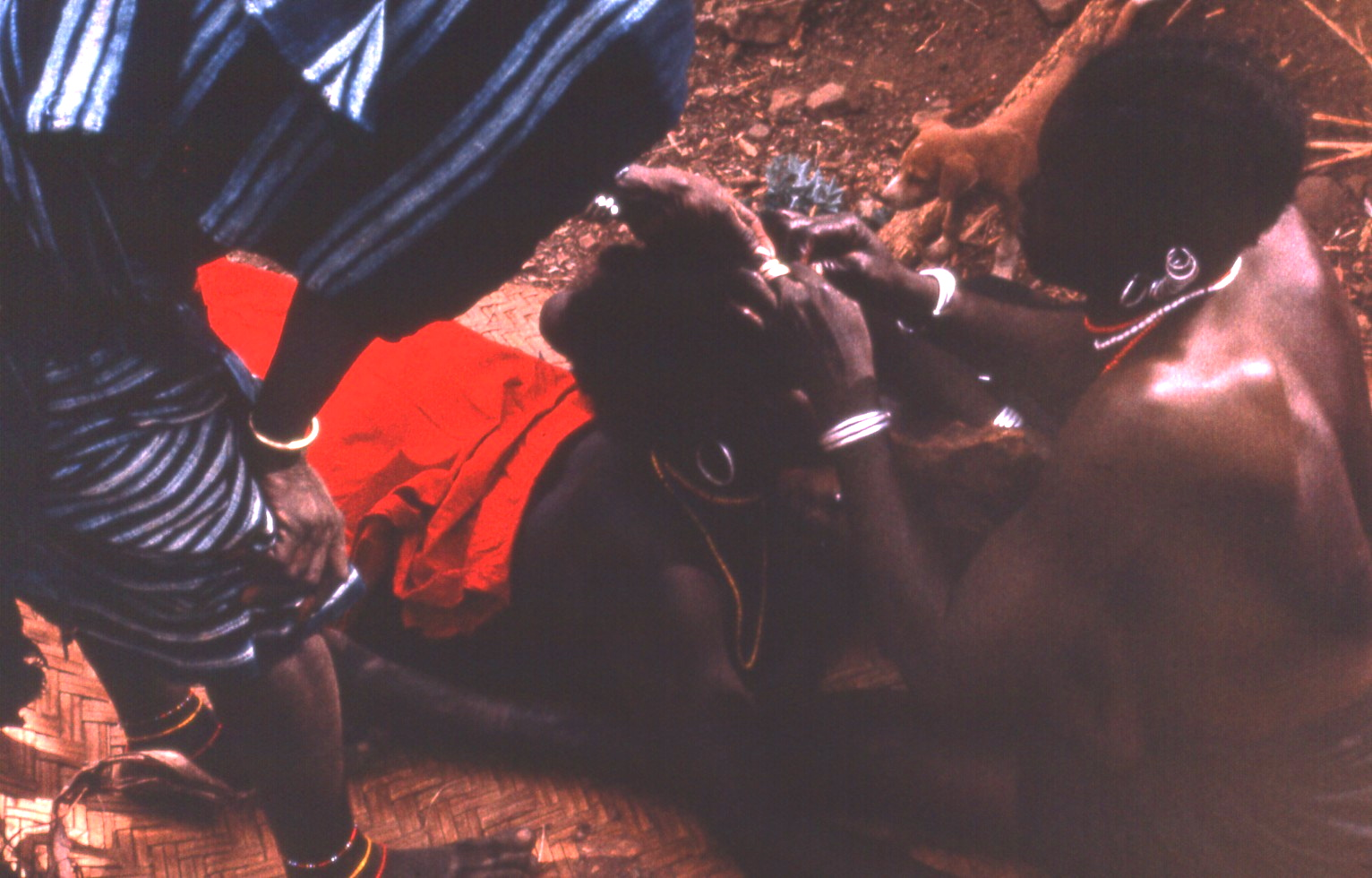
Bedick hairstyling in Iwol.

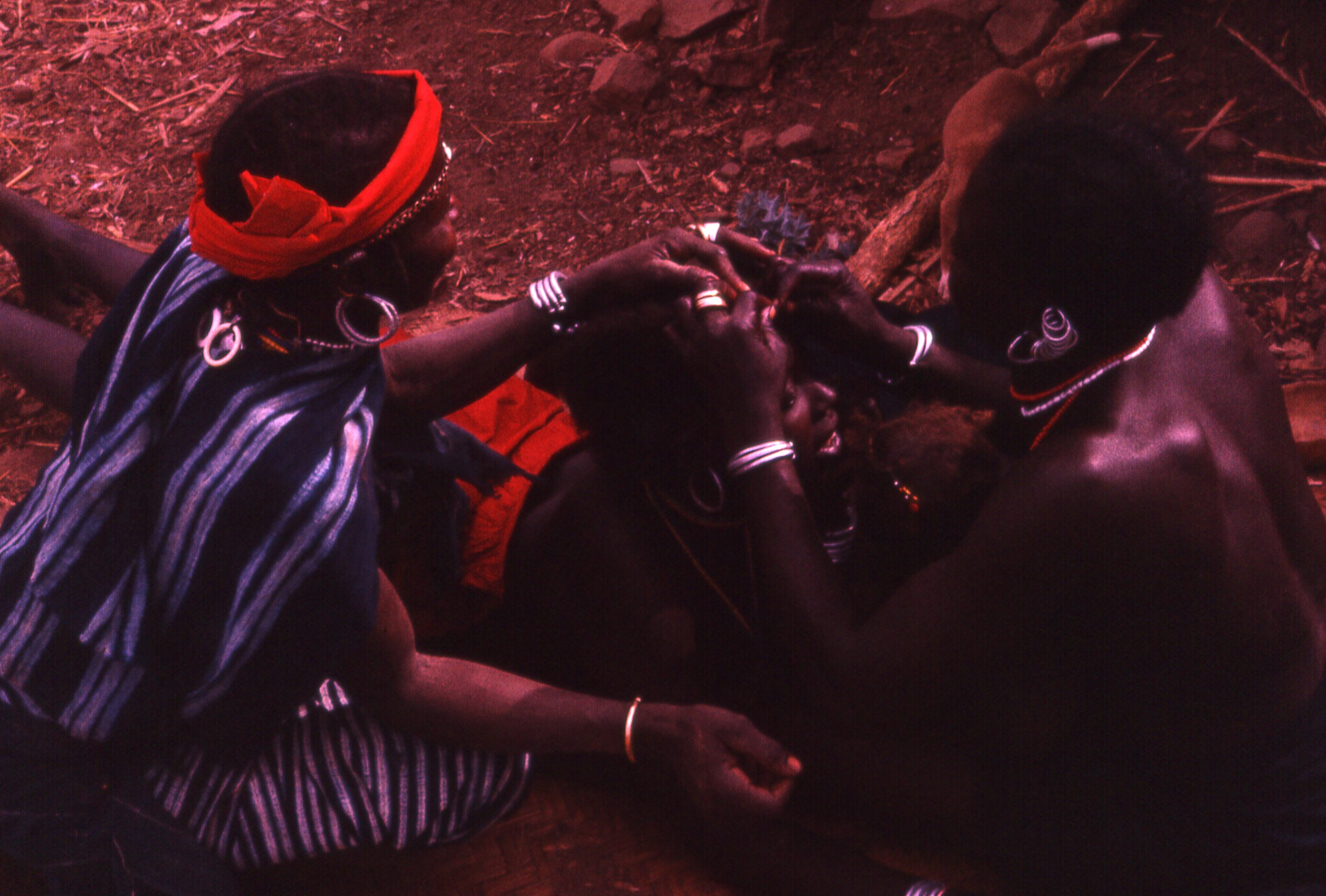
Bedick hairstyling in Iwol.

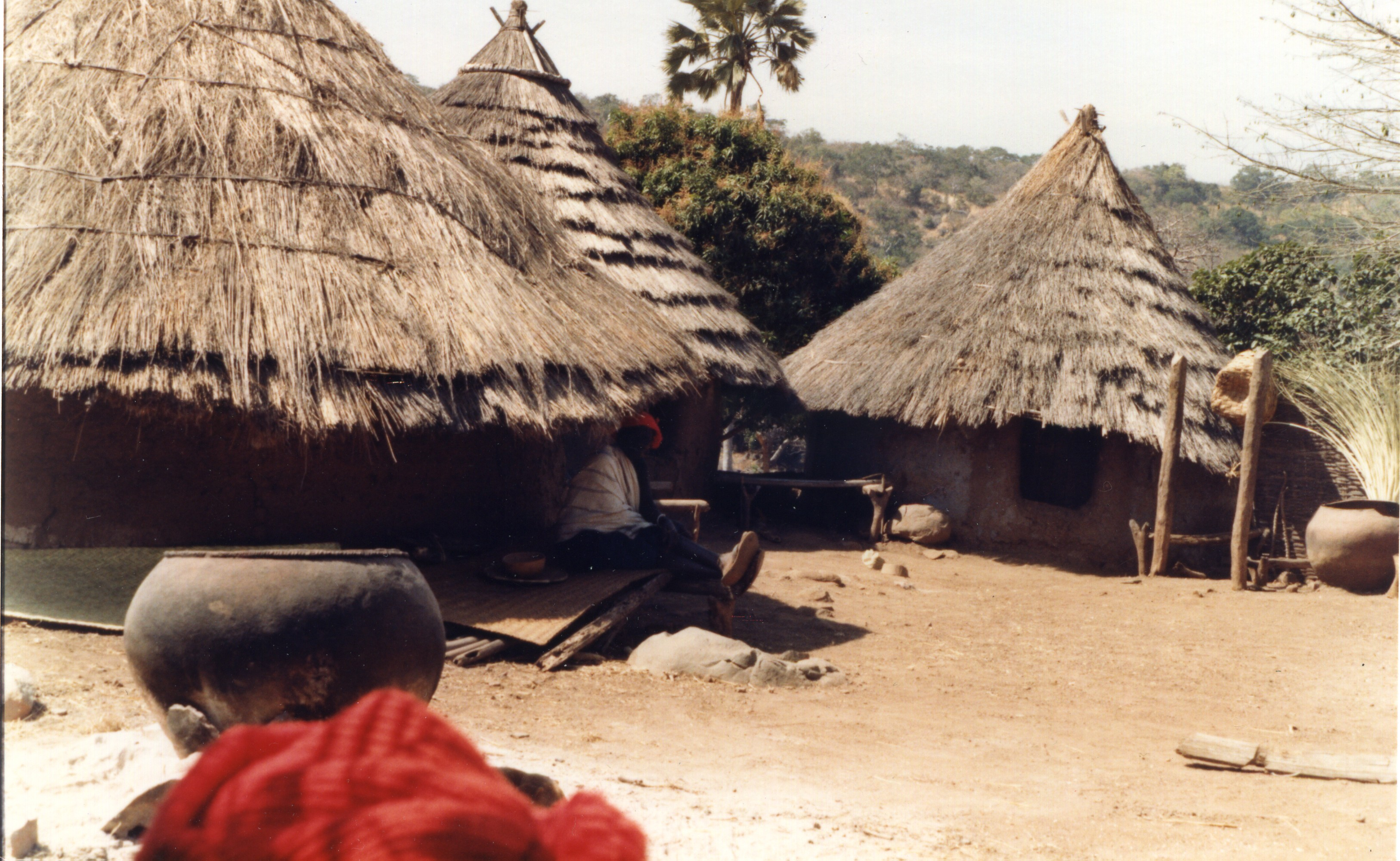
Bedick houses in Iwol.

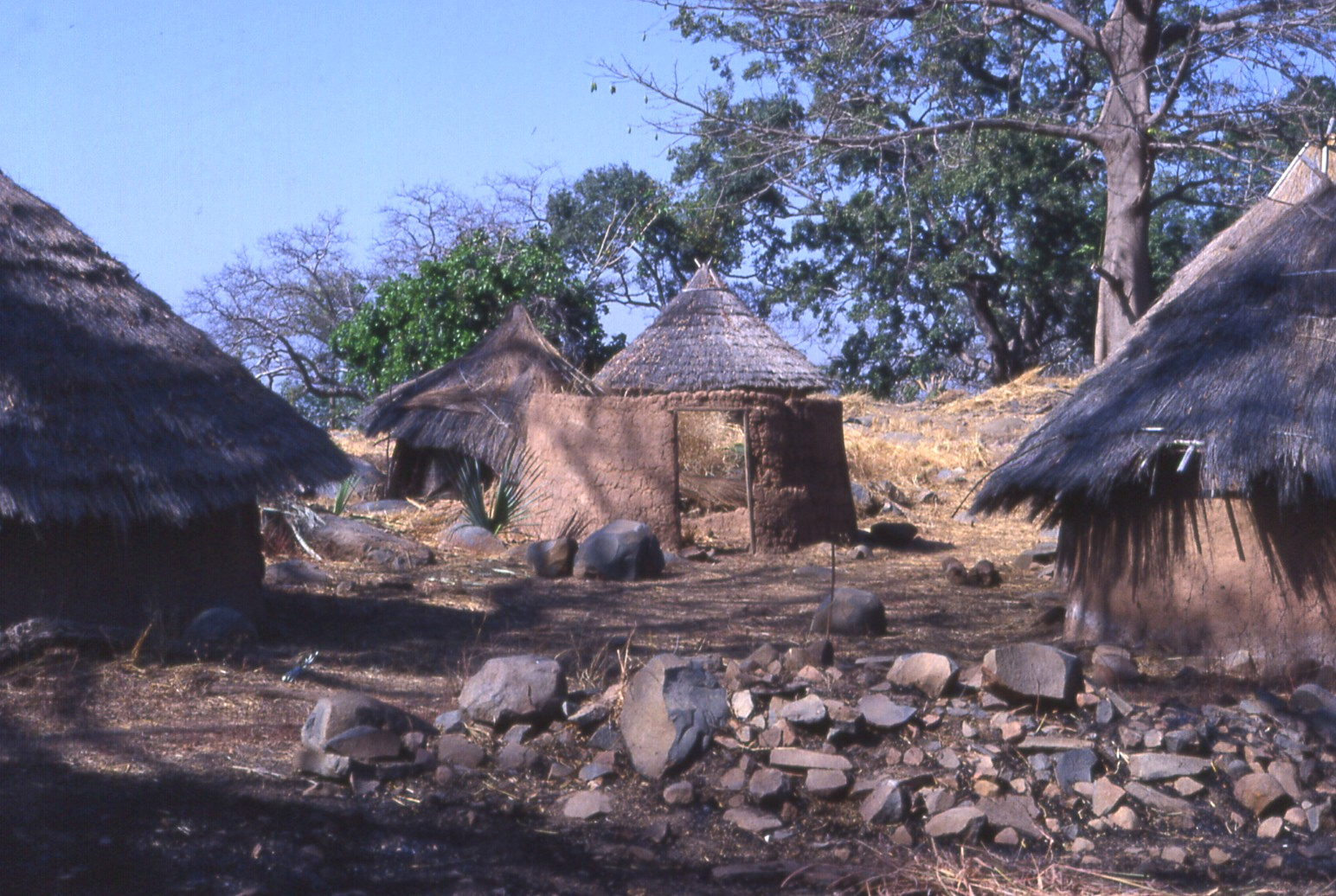
Image of Iwol.

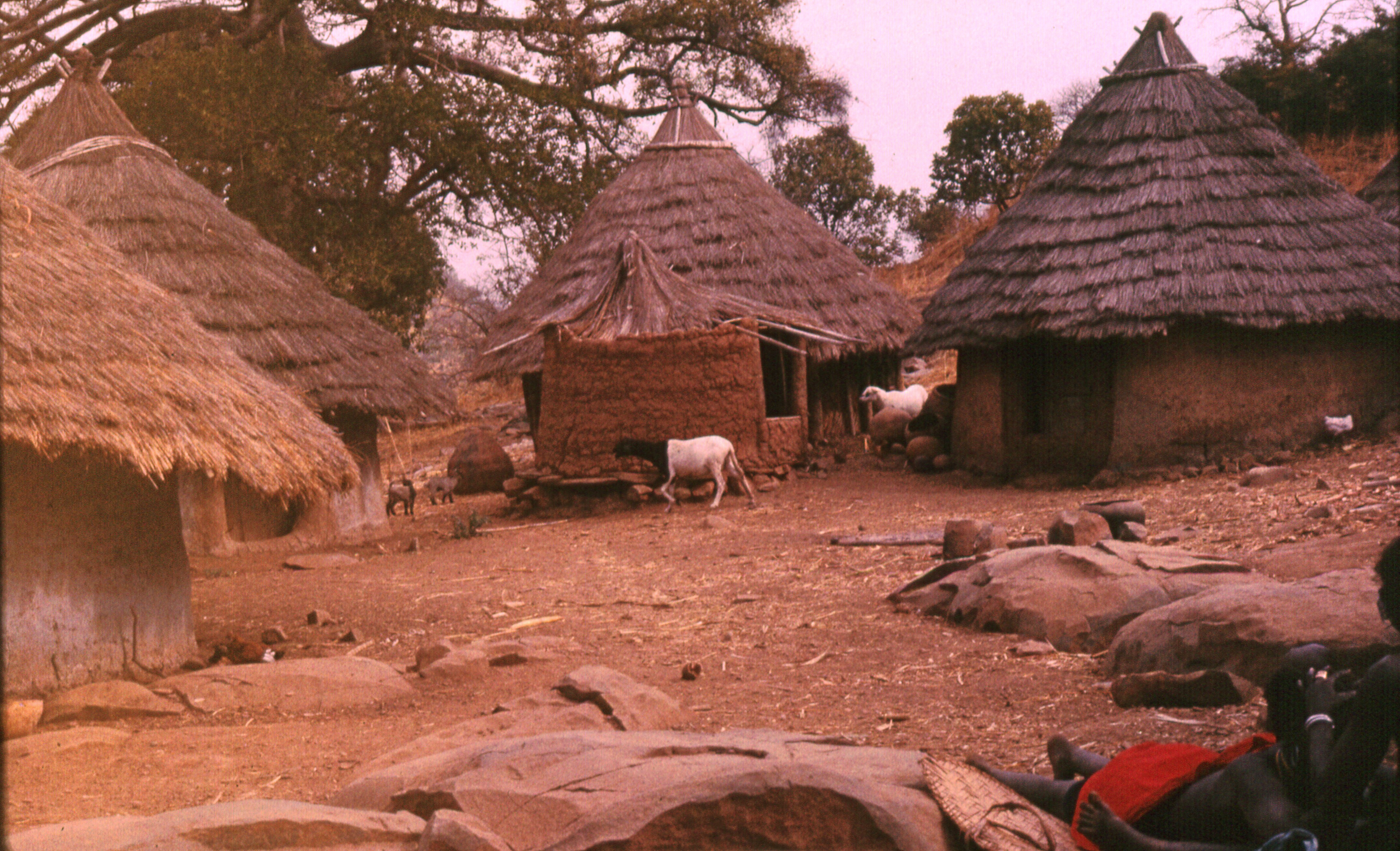
Bedick village.

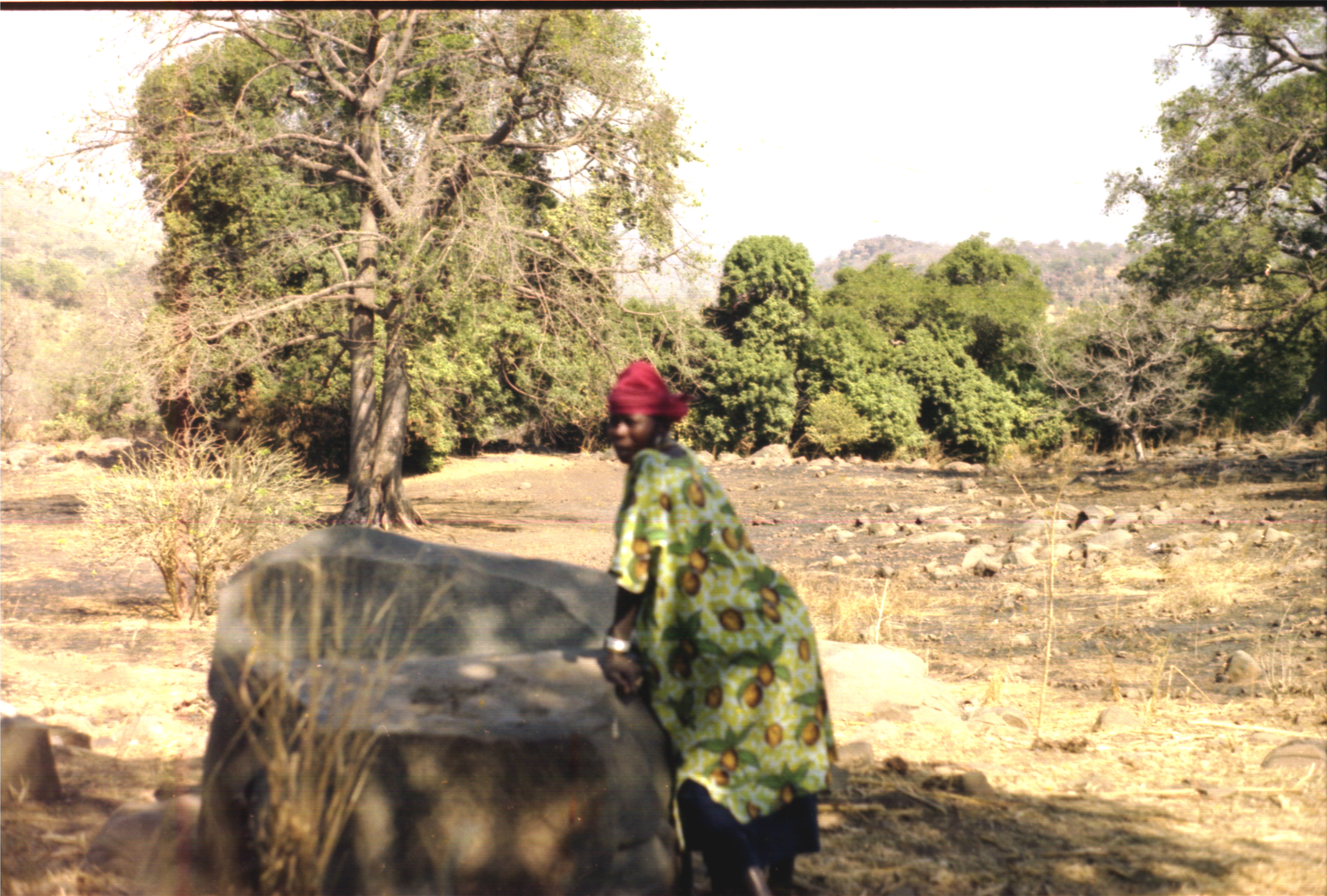
Bedick woman, Iwol.

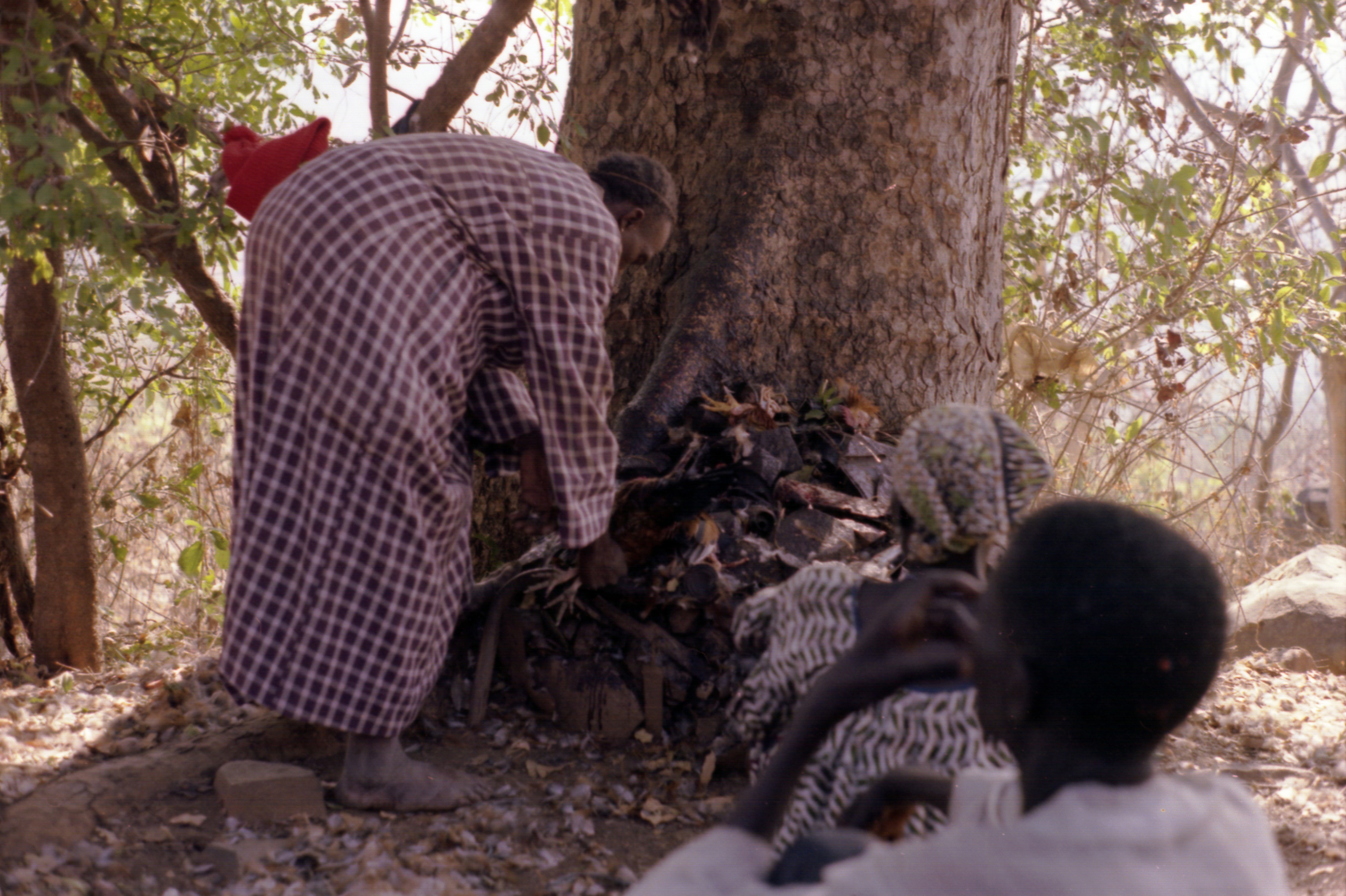
Bedick diviner sacrifices a chicken.

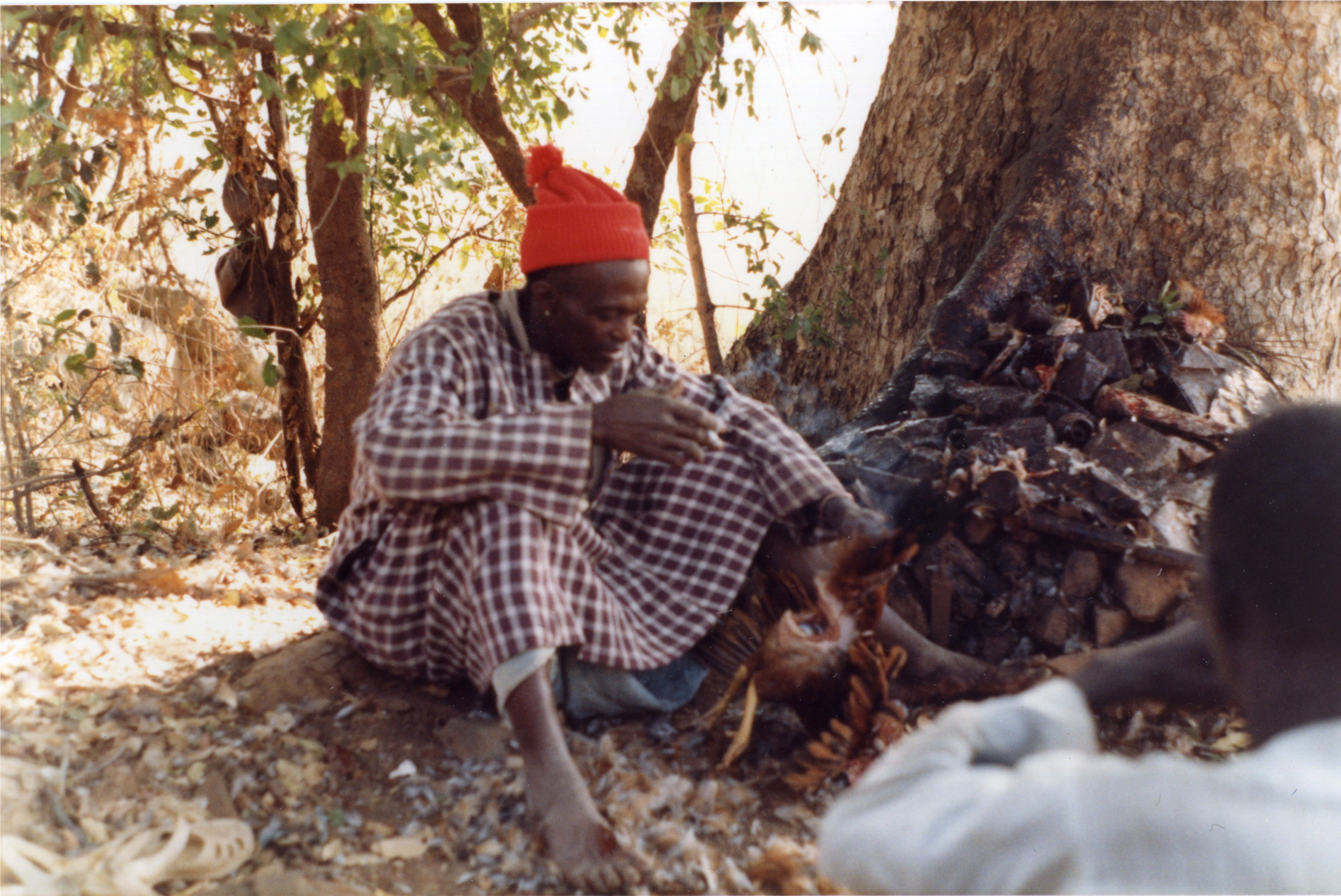
Bedick diviner predicting outcomes by examining the organs of a sacrificed chicken.

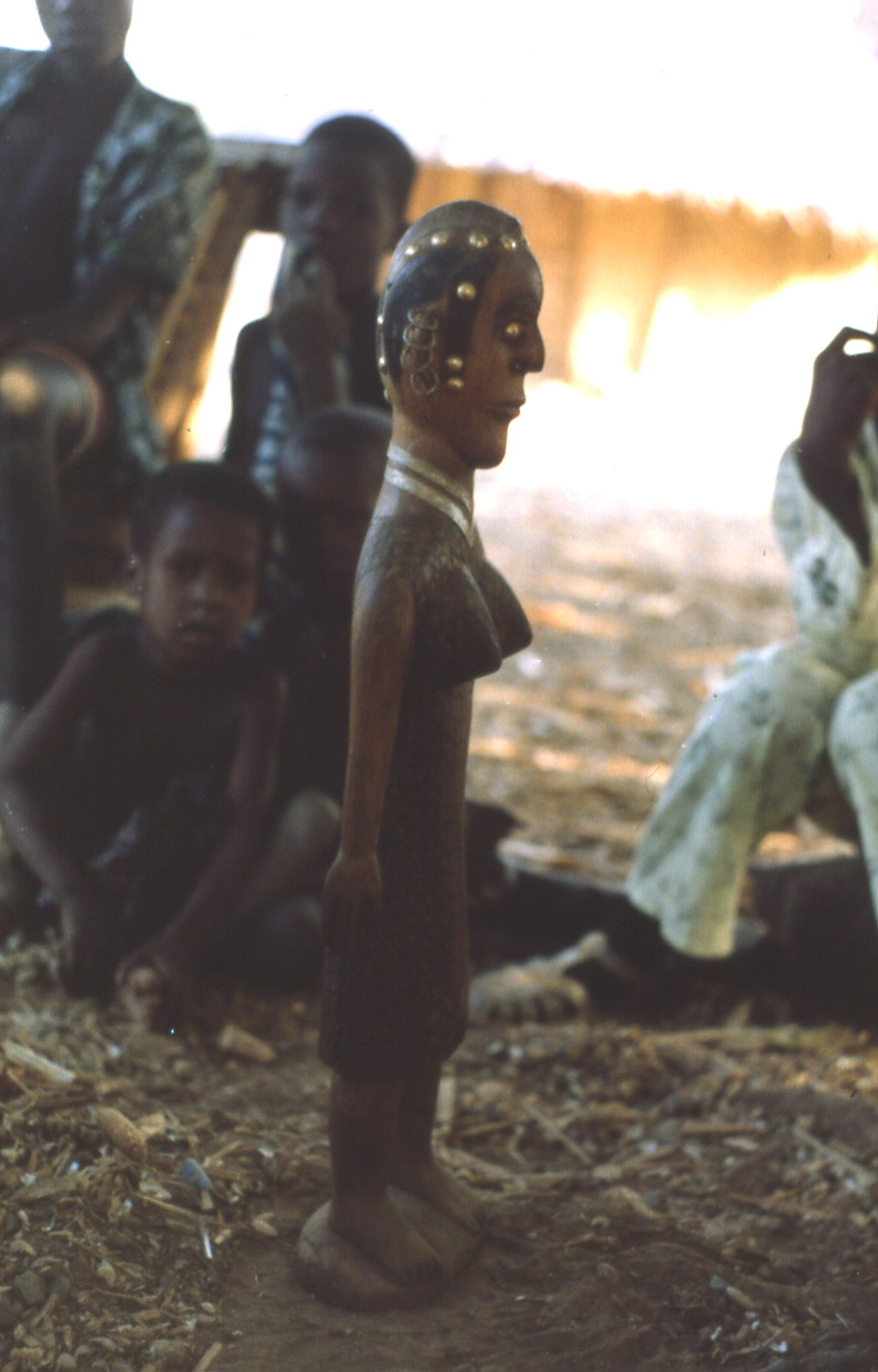
Bedick statue from village of Ibel.

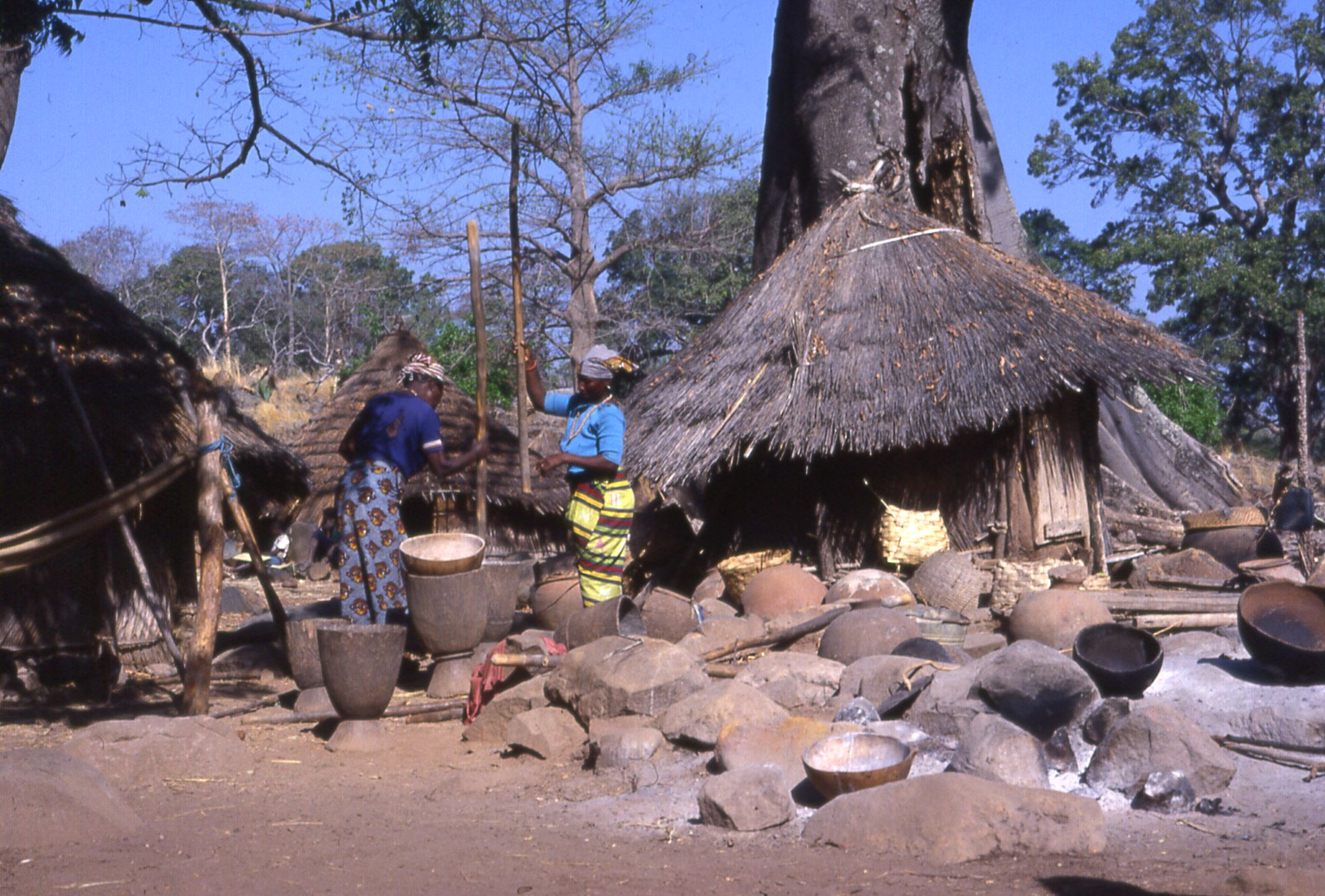
Bedick village.

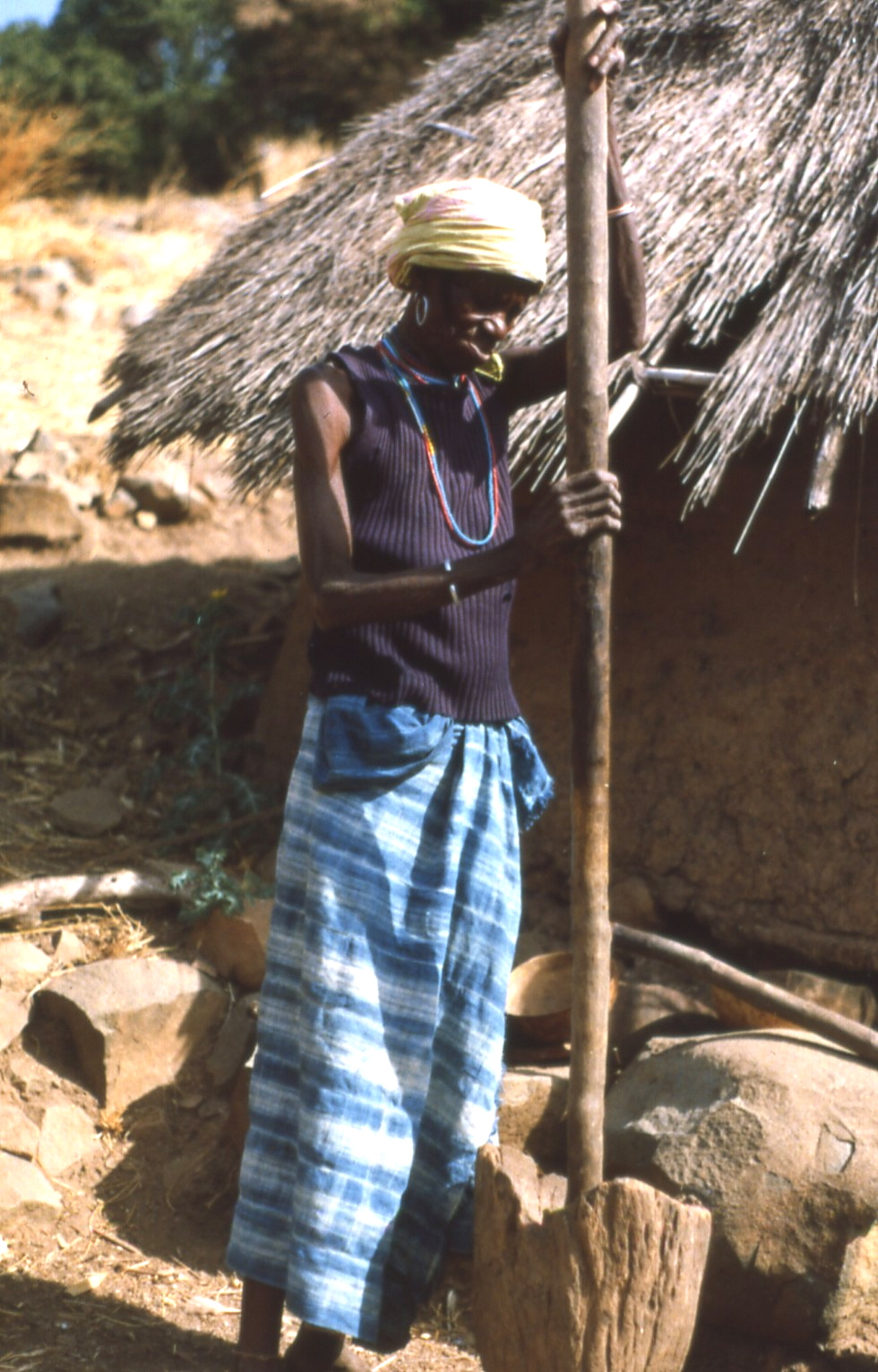
Bedick woman at Iwol.

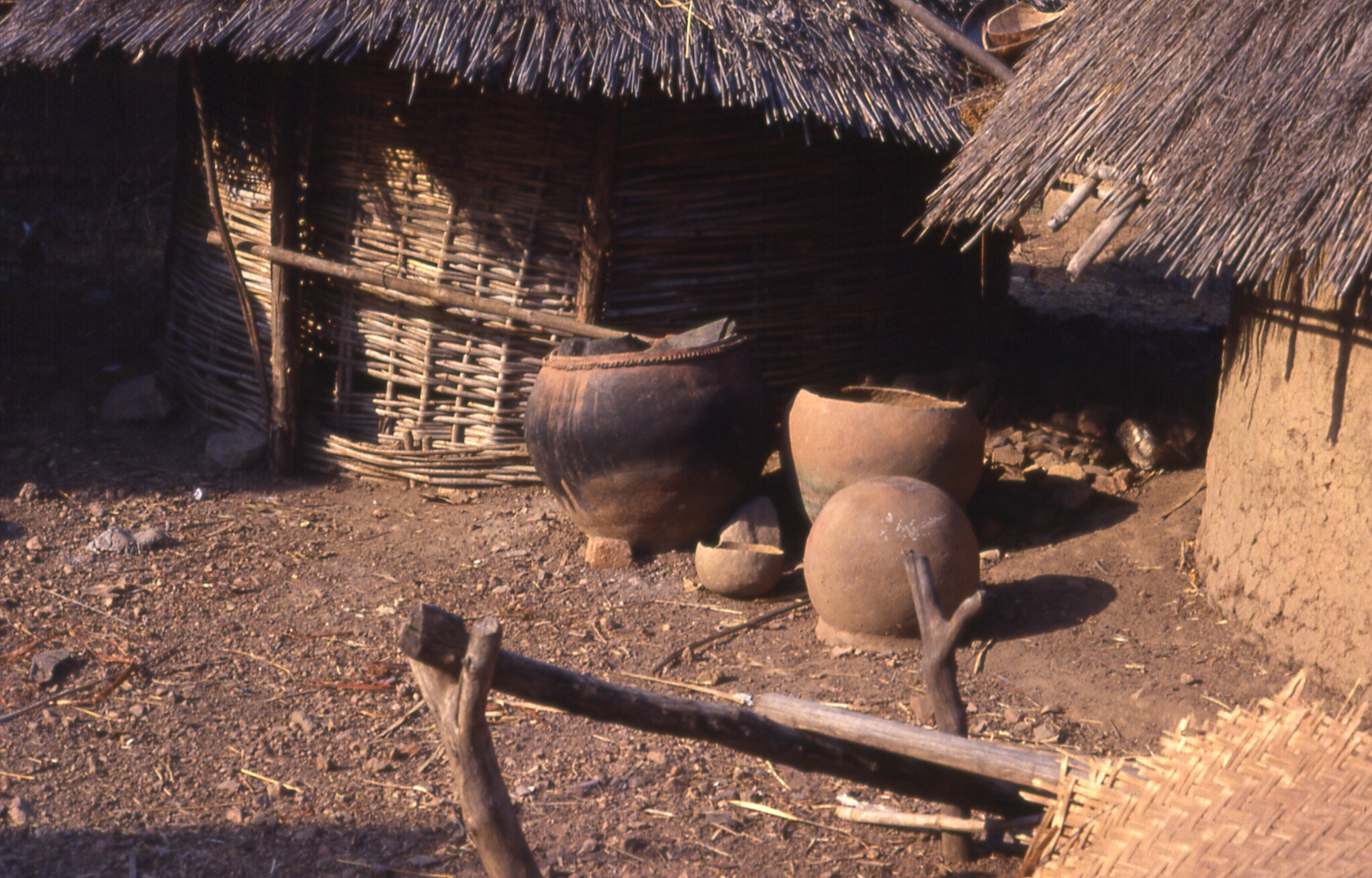
Large clay pot for brewing alcoholic beverage at Iwol.

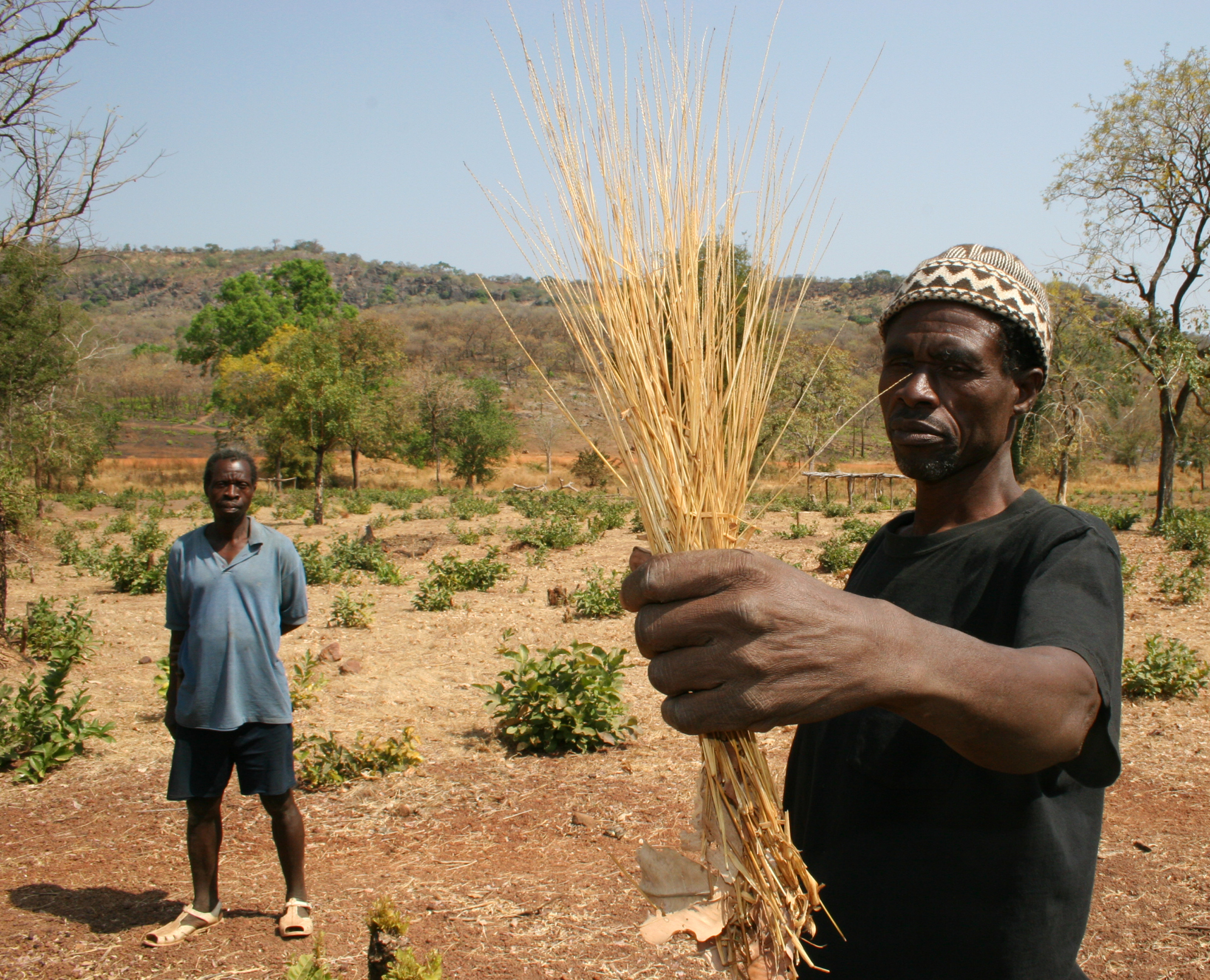
"Village chief of Boula Téné, Theodore Mada Keita, holds up the fonio grain Digitaria exilis that helps feed his family in southern Senegal. Boula Tene is a Bedik village of 200 in the southeast of Senegal, Tambacounda region.

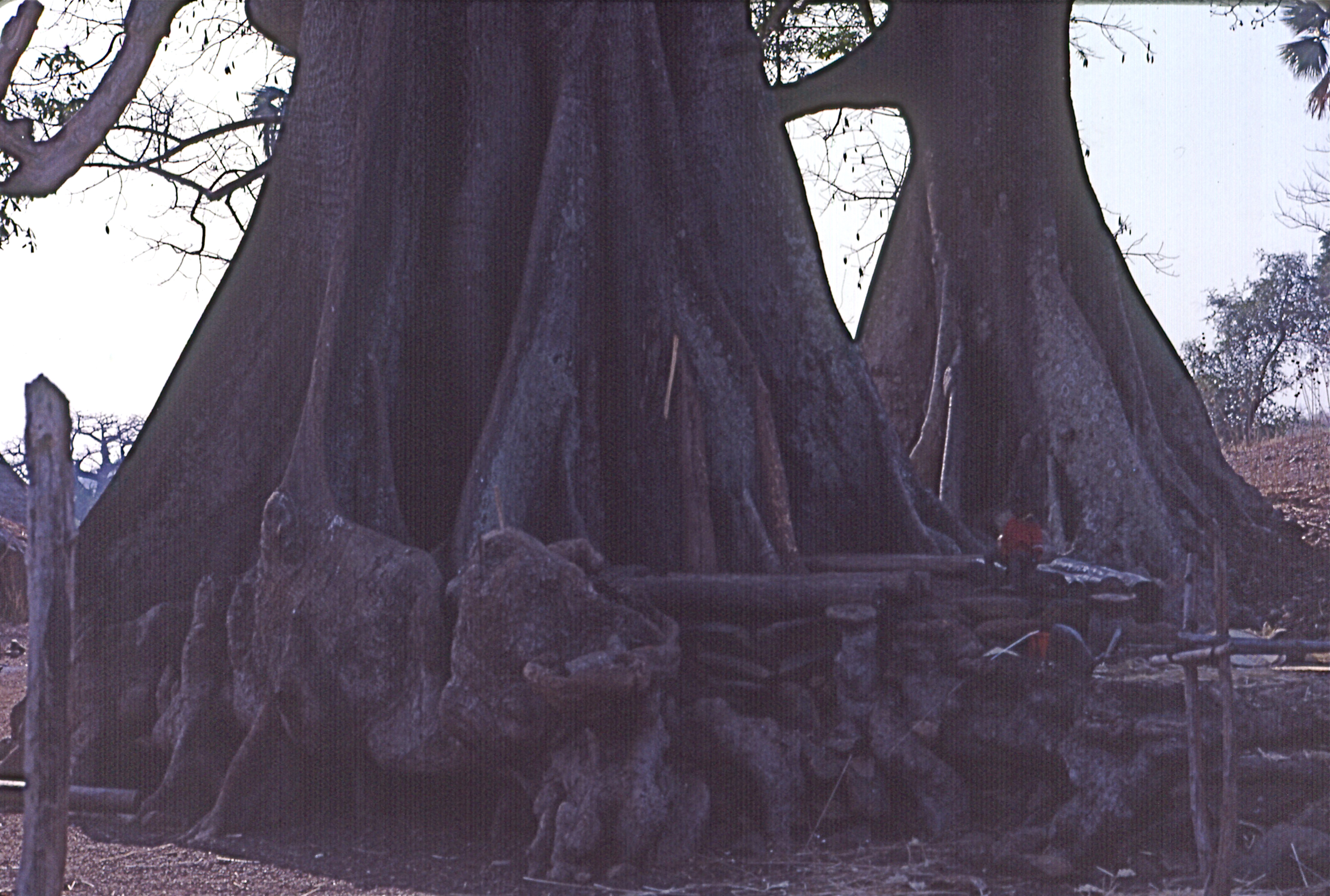
Trees at the edge of a Bedick village.
