= Kédougou region =

Region of Senegal

Kédougou region Région de Kédougou (French) Diiwaanu Kéedugu (Wolof)
- Region
- Location of Kédougou in Senegal

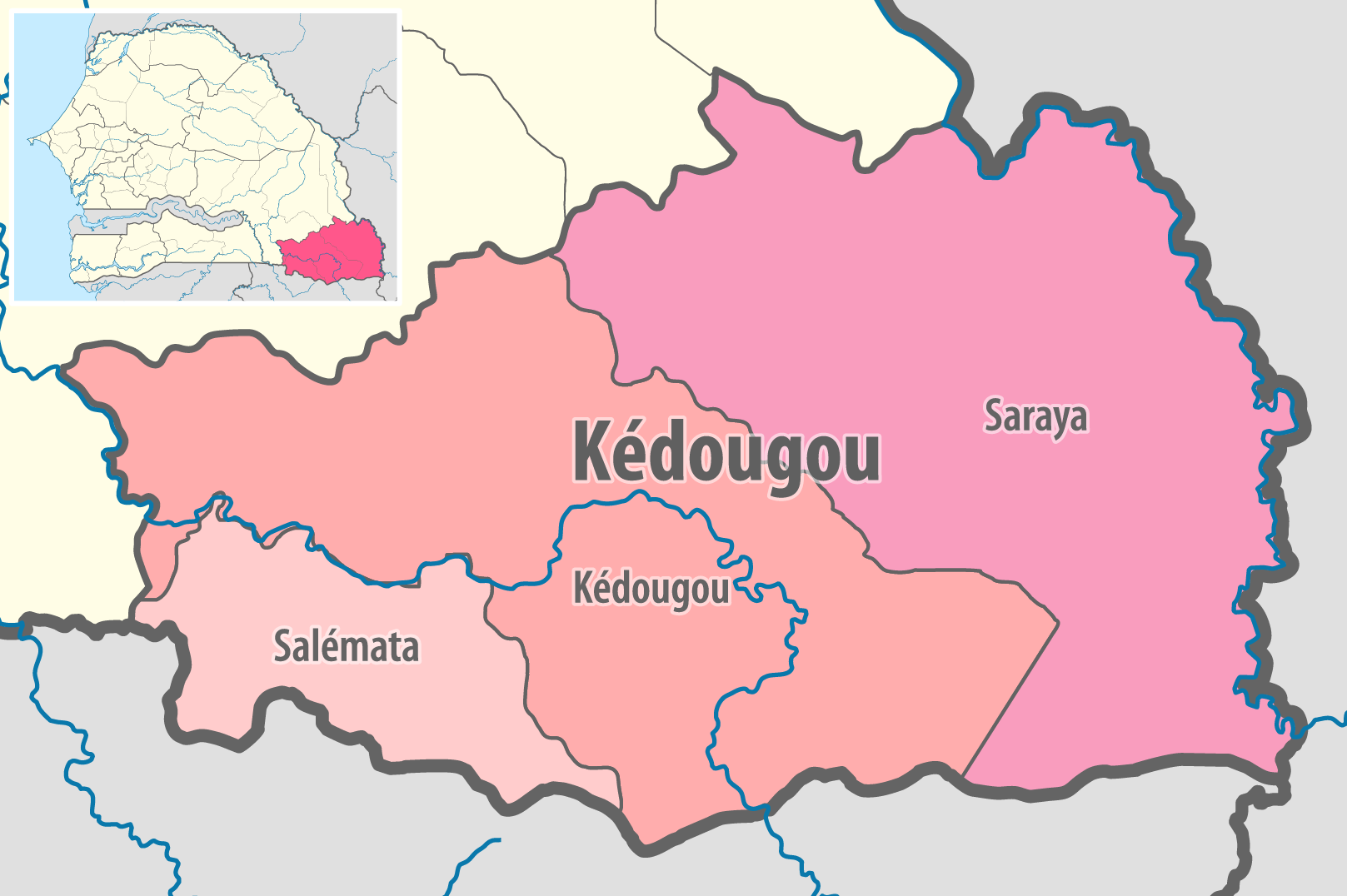
- Kédougou région, divided into 3 départements
- Coordinates: 12°33′N 12°11′W
- Country: Senegal
- Established: 2008
- Capital: Kédougou
- Départements: List: Kedougou; Salémata; Saraya

Government
  - Governor: Mamadou Diom

Area
  - Total: 16,800 km^{2} (6,500 sq mi)

Population (2023 census)
  - Total: 245,288
  - Density: 14.6/km^{2} (37.8/sq mi)
- Time zone: UTC+0 (GMT)

Kédougou is a region of Senegal. It was created in 2008. Formerly it was a department in the region of Tambacounda.

Kedougou has a number of ecotourism attractions.

== Departments ==
Kédougou region has three departments:

- Kédougou département
- Salémata département
- Saraya département

== Geography ==
Kédougou is traversed by the northwesterly line of equal latitude and longitude.
