= Battle of Logandème =

1859 anti-French uprising in modern Senegal

The Battle of Logandème
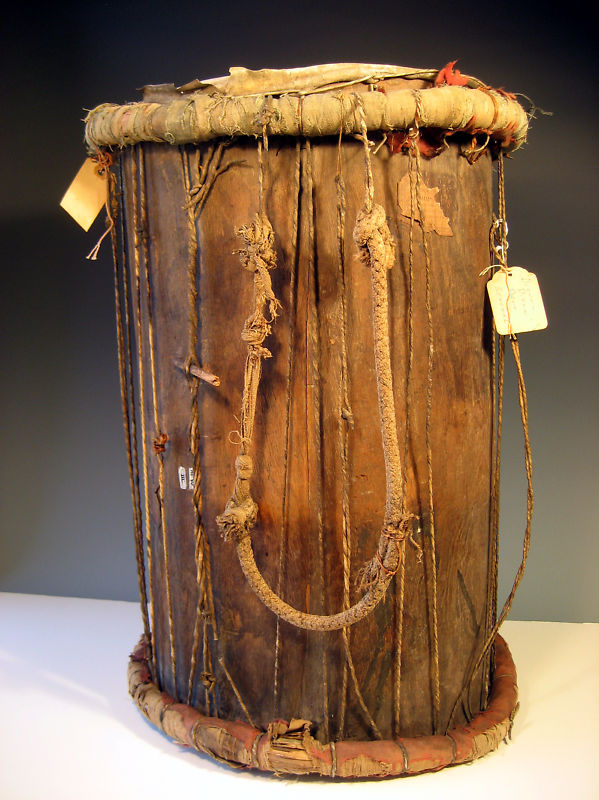
- 19th century junjung of Sine
Date	18 May 1859
Location	Fatick (Kingdom of Sine), now part of Senegal 14.317°N 16.417°W
Result	French victory

Belligerents
French Empire	Kingdom of Sine

Commanders and leaders
Louis Faidherbe (French governor of Senegal) Émile Pinet-Laprade (of France, future governor of Senegal)	Maad a Sinig Kumba Ndoffene Famak Joof (King of Sine - "Maad a Sinig")

Units involved
Louis Faidherbe : Émile Pinet-Laprade; French ally forces...etc	Maad a Sinig Kumba Ndoffene Famak Joof : Ndam Sanou; Diakhaté; Army of Sine
- The battle started around 9 am. About 30 minutes later, the Serer forces overwhelmed by French military might, retreated. However, within few minutes they reappeared on the battlefield and attempted twice to dent the French ranks. They failed and were defeated by the French forces. Ndam Sanou and Diakhaté were among those killed. The former died on the battlefield whilst the latter died later from the injuries he had sustained at the battlefield.

The Battle of Logandème (18 May 1859) was an uprising led by the Serer King Maad a Sinig Kumba Ndoffene Famak Joof, king of Sine, against the French Empire. The battle took place at Logandème (in Fatick) which was a part of Sine at the time. The battle was also a revenge attack against the Serer people after their resounding victory against France at the Battle of Djilass (or Tilas) on 13 May 1859. It was the first time that France decided to employ cannonball in the Senegambia.

== Background ==
After the defeat of Queen Ndateh Yalla Mbooj of Waalo in 1855, Louis Faidherbe decided to launch wars against the Serer kingdoms of Sine and Saloum, and declared all previously signed treaties between the two kingdoms and France null and void and asked for the establishment of new treaties on Faidherbe's terms. According to scholars like Martin A. Klein, that was a huge mistake on the part of the French, because it paved the way for the future Serer kings to use the same tactic against the French, in particular Maad a Sinig Sanmoon Faye, the successor of Maad Kumba Ndoffene Famak in 1871. The revocation of the excessive traditional customs duties paid by the French merchants to the Crown, the Serer kings refusal to have the French buy and own land in Serer countries or to build in masonry (see Maad a Sinig Ama Joof Gnilane Faye Joof) were all contributory factors to this war. However, the Serer resounding victory against the French at the Battle of Djilass on 13 May 1859 was a key factor.

This battle was the first time the French made the decision to employ cannonball in the Senegambia (and possibly in Africa) to avenge their humiliating defeat at the Battle of Djilass (13 May 1859). It was also in this battle where governor Faidherbe showed respect to his enemies (the Serer) by saying: "These people, we kill them, but we do not dishonour them." He said to the French commander of Gorée, Pinet Laprade. After Senegal's independence, that quote was taken up by President Léopold Sédar Senghor as the motto of the country's National Army: "You can kill us but you cannot dishonour us" (French: « On nous tue; on ne nous déshonore pas »).

In May 1859, Faidherbe arrived in Gorée with 200 tirailleurs and 160 marines. He then gathered the Gorée garrison, the people of Gorée, Rufisque and the Lebou people of Dakar to fight against the Serers of Sine in revenge of Kumba Ndoffene and Sanmoon Faye's victory against Pinet-Laprade earlier that year at Tilas. In a letter sent to Paris regarding how he supposedly managed to obtain the support of the Wolofs and the Lebou people, he reports:

"I told them that they were French, and that for this reason they had to take arms to join us and had to participate in the expedition that we are going to make against their neighbours to obtain reparations for wrongs those people had done to us."

From Rufisque, the French ally forces entered Joal, one of the principalities of the Kingdom of Sine. In Joal, they ran into Maad Kumba Ndoffene Famak's Buumi (heir apparent) – Prince Sanmoon Faye, who was on patrol with some of Sine's forces. Taken by surprise and totally ignorant of what the French forces where doing in Serer country, both sides opened fire. The Sine's patrol force was forced to retreat but two of them were captured by the French, and one of them was entrusted with the task to go and relay to Maad Kumba Ndoffene Famak Joof that the French army would be in Fatick in three days time. Fatick was one of the most important principalities of Sine.

== The battle ==
On the morning of 18 May 1859, the French finally arrived in Fatick and took their positions. The army of Sine, which had been mobilised by junjung, stood guard at Logandème. Around 9 am, the Serer army attacked against the French forces. By 9.30 am, overwhelmed by French military power, Maad a Sinig Kumba Ndoffene Famak Joof and his forces were forced to retreat. Within a few minutes, the king of Sine and his cavalry returned to the battlefield. However, they were unable to break the French ranks and were ultimately defeated. After the French victory, governor Louis Faidherbe gave the order for Fatick and its surrounding villages to be burned to the ground. Faidherbe claimed that 150 Serer-Sine men were:

"either killed or wounded, but that the French force had only five wounded".

The French government in Paris criticised Faidherbe for carrying out a military expedition without notifying them. In response to this criticism, Faidherbe claimed that he only occupied an area which had belonged to France since 1679. According to scholars like Klein, Faidherbe was playing with words and was making basic policy in Senegal, which resulted in an occupation of an area that had never belonged to France. Neither the Kingdom of Sine nor any of its provinces had ever belonged to the French.

== Aftermath ==
After his defeat at Logandème and the subsequent occupations of some of Sine's provinces by the French, Maad Kumba Ndoffene Famak was forced into a treaty which he deemed unacceptable. Part of that treaty included: guaranteeing freedom of French commerce, allowing the French a monopoly of trade, giving French traders the right to buy land and build in masonry, the taxes paid to Sine would only be a 3 percent export duty and French subjects were to be tried in French courts.

Maad Kumba Ndoffene Famak viewed the treaty as unfair and concluded that the French were trying to undermine his sovereignty. Historians like Klein and Diouf postulates that, the King of Sine was not yet ready to relinquish his country to the French in spite of French directives. On 8 July 1860, he wrote a letter to the commandant of Gorée which read:

You want to take Fadioudj, Mbourdiam and Ndiouk by force. If you prevent me from having these three villages, we will kill all the Whites who come to our country…. If you take Diavalo (Joal), Fadioudj (Fadiouth) and Ndiouk, there will be a big war between us.

— Maad a Sinig Kumba Ndoffene Famak Joof,

Maad Kumba Ndoffene Famak's threats did little to hamper French dominance in Senegal. However, some of his actions did seriously damage France's economic base in Senegal albeit temporarily, and the damage was very costly for the French administration to repair. To force the French to yield to his demands which included the collection of taxes from and recovery of these provinces, the Maad a Sinig gave the order that all movement of cattle to Joal be stopped. The cattle were destined for Dakar. The peanut fields, which was a major income generator to the French, along with the transport infrastructure were both destroyed. That was followed by a campaign of harassment of French traders at Fatick.

The destruction of the peanut fields did not only affect the French, but also the Serer farmers who bore the brunt of these wars. However, it prevented the farmers of Sine from becoming overdependent on French custom unlike Cayor whose farmers were strongly dependent on France following the famine of Cayor in 1863 and 1864, and Faidherbe granting loans to the Cayor farmers to buy seeds which increased peanut cultivation there, but also forced them to be overdependent on France.

"The French treated Coumba N'Doffène's (Maad a Sinig Kumba Ndoffene Famak Joof's) visit as another example of tyeddo (animist) thievery, but it is more likely that it was another attempt by the Bur (King, the Maad a Sinig) to show the French that he could be a valuable friend or a potent enemy. Coumba N'Doffène's demand was simple: clear recognition of the Bur's (King's) supremacy within Sine."

— Martin A. Klein

The Kingdom of Saloum, under the reign of Maad Saloum Samba Laobe Latsouka Jogop Faal, underwent a similar military campaign by the French. Inspired by Maad Kumba Ndoffene Famak's actions, the King of Saloum did the same. By October 1863, the king of Sine was still trying to recover the lost provinces, particularly Joal, which was extremely important to Maad Kumba Ndoffene, because Joal was a major commercial centre as attested to by David Boilat in "Esquisses Sénégalaises" (1853).

The French conquest of Joal was a severe blow to Maad Kumba Ndoffene Famak, not just economically, but also in terms of defense. Economically, Joal contributed immensely to the country's revenue. The jihads led by the Muslim marabouts such Maba Diakhou Bâ were encroaching on Sine. As the Sine did not depend on French weapons nor French military assistance, Joal was the only gateway for Maad Kumba Ndoffene Famak to purchase arms from the British in the Gambia in order to defend his country from any potential threat the Muslim marabouts may launch in Sine. By the French conquering Joal, they cut off the only route available to Maad Kumba Ndoffene to acquire arms from the British and defend his borders.

The French conquest of parts of Sine, Joal in particular, not only benefited the French, but also the Marabout movement of the 19th century who were buying arms from the British in the Gambia via Saloum, and depended heavily on British arms, albeit Maad Kumba Ndoffene Famak's victory against the marabouts at the Battle of Fandane-Thiouthioune (18 July 1867). Maad a Sinig Kumba Ndoffene Famak Joof saw the French as the greater enemy and threat than Maba Diakhou Bâ. For the next twelve years since his defeat at Logandème by Faidherbe, he continuously tried to fight the French. In August 1871, he left his capital for Joal in order to take it, but was killed by the French.

== Notes ==
=== Bibliography ===
- Sarr, Alioune, "Histoire du Sine-Saloum", (Introduction, bibliographie et Notes par Charles Becker), Bulletin de Institut Fondamental d'Afrique Noire, Tome 46, Serie B, n° 3–4, 1986–1987
- Adande, Alexis, Arinze, Emmanuel, "The place of Women in the Museum of Saint-Louis", [in] "Museums & urban culture in West Africa", Institut africain international, Oxford, 2002, ISBN 0-85255-276-9
- Klein, Martin A., "Islam and Imperialism in Senegal", Sine-Saloum, 1847-1914, Edinburgh University Press, ISBN 0-85224-029-5
- Boilat, David "Esquisses Sénégalaises" (1853), [in] Paris, Karthala, 1984
- Diouf, Cheikh, "Fiscalité et Domination Coloniale: l'exemple du Sine: 1859-1940", Université Cheikh Anta Diop de Dakar (2005)
