= Battle of Fandane-Thiouthioune =

Religious war between the Serer people and the Muslim Marabouts of the 19th century

- Part of Soninke-Marabout Wars
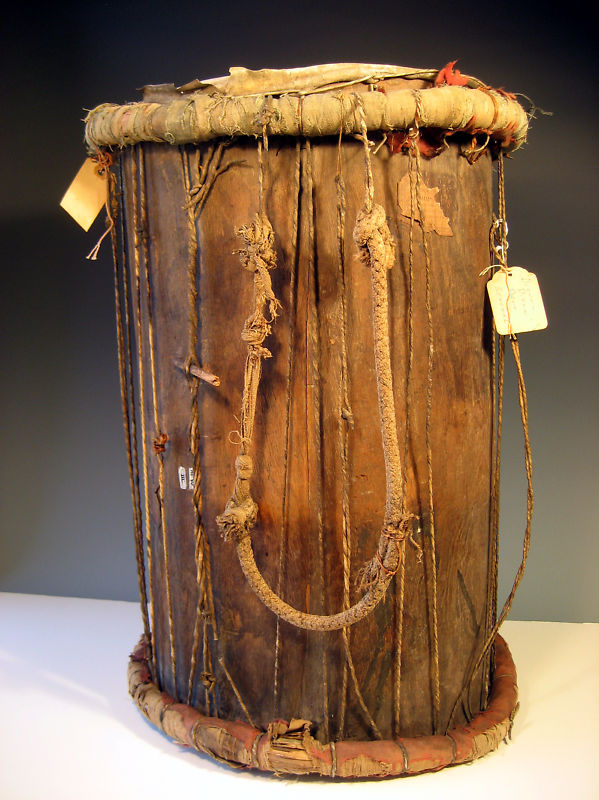
- 19th century junjung of Sine
Date	18 July 1867
Location	Kingdom of Sine, now part of independent Senegal
Result	Serer victory

Belligerents
Muslim Marabouts	Serer people

Commanders and leaders
Maba Diakhou Bâ (Almamy in rebellion) Damel-Teigne Lat Dior Ngoné Latyr Diop (King of Cayor and Baol)	Maad a Sinig Kumba Ndoffene Famak Joof (King of Sine - "Maad a Sinig") Maad Amad Ngoneh Joof (King of Thiouthioune and uncle of Maad a Sinig Kumba Ndoffene Famak Joof)

Units involved
Maba Diakhou Bâ: Damel-Teigne Lat Dior Ngoné Latyr Diop; Bourba Jolof Alboury Sainabou Njie (King of Jolof); Mama Gaolo Nyang; Tafsir Sa Lolley Jabou Samba; Gumbo Gaye (of Sanjal); Abdoulaye Ouli Bâ; Sed Kani Touray; N'Dari Kani Touray; Army of Rip, etc.	Maad a Sinig Kumba Ndoffene Famak Joof: Buumi - Somb; The Great Jaraff; Maad Patar (King of Patar); The Sandigue Ndiob; Maad Amad Ngoneh Joof (King of Thiouthioune); Maad Semou Gallo Joof; Mbagne Somb Faye; Makhoureja Ngoneh Joof; Army of Sine, etc.

The Battle of Fandane-Thiouthioune (or Thiouthiogne), also known as the Battle of Somb or the Battle of Somb-Tioutioune, occurred on 18 July 1867. It was a religious war between the Serer people and the Muslim Marabouts in 19th-century Senegal and the Gambia, but it also had a political and economic dimension to it: vendetta and empire-building. Fandane, Thiouthioune and Somb were part of the pre-colonial Serer Kingdom of Sine, now part of independent Senegal.

The Marabouts prevailed in the early hours of the battle, but the Serer army held firm. In the latter parts of the battle, the Marabouts were defeated. Maba Diakhou Bâ was killed and his body decapitated. Damel-Teigne Lat Dior Ngoné Latyr Diop and Bourba Jolof Alboury Sainabou Njie fled. Maad a Sinig Kumba Ndoffene Famak was injured. Mama Gaolo Nyang was held prisoner.

== Background ==
Prior to this battle, Maba Diakhou Bâ, the leader of the marabouts, was influenced by the king of Cayor and Baol - Lat-Dior - to launch a jihadist assault in the Sine. Lat-Dior had a grudge against Maad a Sinig Kumba Ndoffene Famak Joof after he was defeated by the French at the Battle of Loro on January 12, 1864, and exiled from his kingdom. Lat-Dior sought refuge with the Maad a Sinig, who granted him asylum. The Damel-Teigne asked the Maad a Sinig to loan him some of his forces so he could fight against the French and regain his throne. The Maad a Sinig refused to do that because he was already engaged in a long battle against the French himself in regards to the sovereignty of Joal, one of his provinces.

Lat-Dior sought the assistance of Maba, the Almami of Nioro du Rip. Maba promised to help Lat-Dior regain his throne if he converted to Islam. Lat-Dior converted and in 1867, he proposed to the Almami to launch a jihad in Sine.

The Marabouts surprised the Serer people of Mbin o Ngor, a small Serer village in the Sine, the "Surprise of Mbin o Ngor" in April 1867. Although the Serers managed to drive back the marabout forces stopping them from conquering their country, the marabouts' attack caused significant damage before they were finally forced to retreat. Some prominent Serer princesses such as Lingeer Selbeh Ndoffene Joof, daughter of the Maad a Sinig, was abducted and forcefully married off to Abdoulaye Oulimata Bâ, Maba Diakhou's brother. Princess Lingeer Fatma Tioube was also abducted along with Lingeer Selbeh Ndoffene and held prisoners by the Marabout forces. Some prominent Serer personalities and princes such as Boucary Ngoneh Joof (var : Boucar Ngoné Diouf or Bukaro Ngooni Juuf) who was a relative and counsel of the King of Sine was killed in that attack.

After this incident, the Maad a Sinig sent a letter to the leader of the Marabouts, Maba Diakhou Bâ, inviting him to an open battle. In that letter, he wrote, "This attack is undignified... If you are a man, I challenge you to come back and meet the full army of Sine in open battle."

== Fandane-Thiouthioune ==
After Maad a Sinig Kumba Ndoffene Famak’s invitation to Maba to an open battle following "The surprise of Mbin o Ngor", Maba and his army went to the Sine having acquired arms and ammunition in British Gambia. On 18 July 1867, the "Watchers" notified the King of Sine that the Rip army (the Muslim army from Nioro du Rip) is approaching Sine.

=== The rituals ===
According to Serer oral tradition, before Maad a Sinig Kumba Ndoffene Famak and his army made their way to the battlefield, he summoned the elders (his counselors) to perform the ancient rituals of their forefathers. He then commanded his Jaraff (head of the noble Council of Electors) also a Saltigue, - Wassaly Sene to perform the ritual of the ancestors and predict the outcome. Wassaly Sene is reported to have cited the name of Roog (the Supreme Deity in Serer religion), raised his spear to the Gods of the heavens and struck it to the ground. He then cried out "Victory!" During the battle, Maba Diakhou Bâ is said to have recited the Shahada (Islamic declaration of faith) from the Quran.

=== The armies ===
Maad a Sinig Kumba Ndoffene Famak Joof's army composed of the Buumi Somb (the heir to the throne of Somb with his army from the east); the Great Jaraff and his army from the south; Maad Patar (King of Patar) and his army from the north-east; the Sandigue Ndiob from the north; Maad Amad Ngoneh Joof (King of Thiouthioune and uncle of Maad Kumba Ndoffene Famak); Makhoureja Ngoneh Joof (variation : Makhoukhédia Ngoné, prince of Sine and younger brother of Boucary Ngoneh Joof who was killed at Mbin o Ngor); the Great Farba (his general) as well as the army of Sine, covering the west and north-west; Maad Saloum Sadiouka Mbodj (king of Saloum); etc. The griots beat junjung of Sine (the war drums) - a call for arms.

Maba Diakhou Bâ was accompanied by his brothers Ousmane Bâ and Abdoulaye Ouli Bâ (not to be confused with the historian Abdou Bouri Bâ, grand-nephew of Maba); the King of Cayor and Baol Damel-Teigne Lat Dior Ngoné Latyr Diop (and his army); the King of Jolof, Bourba Jolof Alboury Sainabou Njie (and his army); Gumbo Gaye (king of Sanjal) - also spelt Gumbo Guèye; Biran Ceesay (Biranne Cissé); his generals such as Mama Gaolo Nyang and Tafsir Sa Lolley Jabou Samba (general and military advisor to Maba); etc.

=== The battle ===
The Sine army having performed the required rituals according to Serer custom, Maad a Sinig Kumba Ndoffene Famak Joof led his army to Somb (in the Kingdom of Sine), the battlefield. Serer tradition states that, Somb was the starting point of the battle but it did not end there. It ended in Fandane-Thiouthioune where the outcome was decided. Muslim tradition agrees pretty much with this account.

On the day of the battle, there was a heavy rain. Maad Semou Gallo Joof (son of Maad Amad Ngoneh) with his cousin Mbagne Somb Faye and their griots led an attack on the Muslim Marabout forces. The Serer strategy was to push the Muslim Marabout forces into Somb where a strong resistance had been prepared and to prevent them from entering Thiouthioune. The strategy failed. Maba and his army successfully entered Thiouthioune. However at Thiouthioune, Maba's army faced a strong resistance by some of the retinue forces of King Amad Ngoneh of Thiouthioune, which included Maad Semou Gallo Joof and the princes: Gniba Dior Joof, Madior Latdjigué and Biram Joof. The battle took place between Somb and Thiouthioune and lasted three quarters of the morning. In the early stages of the battle, the Muslim Marabouts prevailed. The princes and Maad (King) Semou Gallo Joof were killed. The prince Mbagne Somb Faye committed suicide when he was captured by the Muslim Marabouts. Around 12 pm, it started to rain. Maba and his army took refuge in the coppices which surrounded the pond of Fandane and attempted to dry off their arms. Around that time, Maad Kumba Ndoffene Famak had left Ndoffane Nomad with his army and moving towards Fandane to defend it. Before his arrival, Damel-Teigne Lat-Dior Ngoneh Latyr and Bourba Jolof Alboury Sainabou (both valiant and experienced warriors) contemplated withdrawing from the battle at around 2 pm (tisbâr time – Muslim prayer time in the afternoon). Damel-Teigne Lat Dior reported to Maba that, he had heard the sound of Sine's junjung approaching, and Maad Kumba Ndoffene Famak is bound to be among them. He tried to discuss an exit strategy because the Sine army would be too strong for them. Maba was not interested in an exit strategy, his mission was to Islamize and conquer Serer Sine. When Maad Kumba Ndoffene Famak and his army, accompanied by the King of Patar; the King of Poukham and the Sandigue Ndiob arrived on the scene, they interposed between the Muslim Marabout forces and the Kingdom of Saloum locking the Marabouts in Sine and cutting off their exit route into Nioro du Rip (Maba's residence), via Saloum. Damel-Teigne Lat Dior Ngoné Latyr and Bourba Jolof Alboury Sainabou Njie realising that the cause has been lost, abandoned Maba in the battlefield. They fought their way out of the battlefield, the Damel-Teigne escaped and headed towards Cayor and the Bourba Jolof towards Gossas. The Serer army defeated the Muslim Marabouts. Maba was killed at Fandane and so was the Serer Prince Makhoureja Ngoneh Joof whom according to some was responsible for killing Maba. The King of Sine was injured. Many of Maba's men fell at Fandane-Thiouthioune. His generals such as Mama Gaolo Nyang were held prisoners. Mama Gaolo was released two days after the battle to go and relay the incident in his country. After Maba had been killed, Maad Kumba Ndoffene Famak had his head cut off and his limbs dismembered. He then sent an arm and the head, with a letter to the French commandant at Gorée to announce his victory. The remains of Maba's body were scattered in several parts of Sine, including Felir, Samba Toude, Ndialgué and towards Thiamassas. According to some scholars such as Diagne, Becker, Cheikh Diouf, Klein, etc., Maad Kumba Ndoffene Famak's letter and action was a threat to the French administration in Senegal, especially his succeeding letter sent to the French governor which listed the prominent members of Maba's army that had fallen in the Sine. The French administration in Senegal under the governorship of Émile Pinet-Laprade kept out of the battle. They armed neither side nor did they involved their forces. The French also had limited ammunition and forces (they were dying from the wars and diseases). Although Lamprade tried to gain more arms and French forces from France for the protection of French interest in the colony, the French government in Paris refused to sanction it and decided to devote all French resources in France due to the crisis in Europe, and their ultimate defeat in the Franco-Prussian War. As such, Laprade was ordered "to stay on the defensive" and told "he would not even receive white troops" to replace those who have died from disease.

Abdoulaye Ouli Bâ (Maba's brother) was not killed in the battle. In a revenge attack, he was castrated for participating in the surprise of Mbin o Ngor, the kidnapping of Lingeer Selbeh Ndoffene Joof (Maad Kumba Ndoffene Famak's daughter), forcefully marrying her and making her pregnant. Although released, he went missing for some time people thought that he had died like his two brothers (Maba and Ousmane) at the battle. He resurfaced by January 1868 during the raidings of the Mandinka principalities of Niani and Ouli, in the Gambia.

=== Victory anthem of Sine ===
At the end of the battle, the victorious King of Sine Kumba Ndoffene Famak nursed his injuries and led his army back home. The griots of Sine beat the junjung and chanted the following hymn in his honour (the hymn is still chanted in his honour):

In Serer

Fap Hamad Joof

Tandeh fo Kaet

O or Oleh hat Fandane

Dala Ngot

Bo fud es a buta

Mbai a varan'am

Sun ne'n Jahu

Ye de bgara

Me Somb a ndefu

Yerer a Tutun

Mbai Souka Ndella

A raha O ndonga'nga

Mbel Fandane eh

Talaba a naga pitit pasar

Ma Samba a humna

Jahu dang O lol

O ndongo sima

Ya eh! Tig eh fuhuna

Han O dal in eh

Roog a taha Mbai, O Kor Nadi

Vara ndongo yo!

Yacine O! Mbombeh O!

Kumba Ndoffene a var Maba

O kor of eh

Hoh um Tugal O!

O bai um oleh Sedu

Taf um Tangeget

Sun neh na Jahu Dob

Tonkater o mad.

In English

Father Hamad Joof,

Tandeh and Kaet,

the devastation they left at Fandane

and went to camp in Ngot.

To calm and settle my stomach

let Mbaye kill him.

This bull of Jahu.

Coming back,

he passed by Somb,

he couldn't go to drink at Thiouthioune.

Mbaye, son of Souka Ndella,

he pushed away the little talibeh.

At the marigot of Fandane, hé!

the drums beat loud

Masamba is sealed

Jahu begins to cry

The talibeh leaves us in peace.

Hey! My mother! There is no time for anger

But to laugh:

It is Roog’s will that Mbaye, brother of Nadi,

Has killed the Marabout.

Hey Yassin! Hey Mbombeh!

Kumba Ndoffene has killed Maba.

Your husband!

His head is in Europe!

His hands at Sedhiou!

His feet at Tëngéej (Rufisque)!

The bull of Jahu Dob

Will never offend the King.

"Coumba Ndoffene crushed their rebellion. Maba Diakhou, leader of the insurgent will be wiped out with his troops and buried without pomp in the heart of Sine."

— Pathé Diagné,

== Controversy ==
Senegal's Ministry of Culture states that, Maba was buried in Mbel Fandane – the mausoleum which is venerated by people in honour of Maba. Serer Sine's oral tradition refute this. According to the Serers of Sine, after Maba was killed, he was dismembered and his body parts scattered in various parts of the country. An arm and the head were sent to the French Commandant at Gorée accompanied by a letter from Maad a Sinig Kumba Ndoffene Famak Joof. Their tradition went on to state that, the mausoleum that is venerated is that of Makhoureja Ngoneh Joof and not that of Maba Diakhou Bâ. It was Makhoureja Ngoneh who was buried there not Maba. According to Cheikh Diouf, in a letter marked 31 July 1867 deposited at the National Archives of Senegal, the French replied to Maad Kumba Ndoffene Famak's previous letter in which they asked : "What do you want us to do with his remains?"

== See also ==
Serer side

- Maad a Sinig Kumba Ndoffene Famak Joof
- Serer people
- Kingdom of Sine
- Kingdom of Saloum

Muslim side

- Maba Diakhou Bâ
- Lat Dior
- Toucouleur people
- Wolof people
- Nioro du Rip
- Cayor
- Jolof

Present-day countries

- History of Senegal
- History of Gambia

Religions

- Islam in Senegal
- Islam in the Gambia
- Serer Religion

== Notes ==
=== Bibliography ===
- Bâ, Abdou Bouri. Essai sur l’histoire du Saloum et du Rip. Avant-propos par Charles Becker et Victor Martin. Publié dans le Bulletin de l’Institut Fondamental d’Afrique Noire. Tome 38, Série B, n° 4, octobre 1976, p. 813-860.
- Bâ-Curry, Ginette. In Search of Maba: A 19th Century Epic from Senegambia, West Africa (Preface of the Play by Edris Makward, Emeritus Professor of African Literature, Univ of Wisconsin, USA), Phoenix Press International, Maryland, 2011 [Category: Drama].
- Diouf, Niokhobaye. Chronique du royaume du Sine. Suivie de notes sur les traditions orales et les sources écrites concernant le royaume du Sine par Charles Becker et Victor Martin. (1972). Bulletin de l'Ifan, Tome 34, Série B, n° 4, (1972).
- Bâ, Tamsir Ousman. Essai historique sur le Rip (Bur Sine Mahecor Diouf; Latgarand N'Diaye & Abdou Boury Bâ). BIFAN. 1957
- Diouf, Cheikh. Fiscalité et Domination Coloniale: l'exemple du Sine: 1859-1940. Université Cheikh Anta Diop de Dakar - (2005)
- Gravrand, Henri. Horizons Africaines, No 68, p 15
- Diagne, Pathé. Pouvoir politique traditionnel en Afrique occidentale: essais sur les institutions politiques précoloniales. Published: Présence africaine, 1967.
- L'épopée de Sanmoon Fay. Ethiopiques n°54 revue semestrielle de culture négro-africaine Nouvelle série volume 7 2e semestre 1991
- Diouf, Cheikh. Fiscalité et Domination Coloniale: l'exemple du Sine: 1859-1940. Université Cheikh Anta Diop de Dakar - (2005)
- Diouf, Mahawa. L’INFORMATION HISTORIQUE : L’EXEMPLE DU SIIN. Ethiopiques n°54 revue semestrielle de culture négro-africaine Nouvelle série volume 7 2e semestre 1991
- Klein, Martin A. Islam and Imperialism in Senegal Sine-Saloum, 1847–1914. Edinburgh At the University Press (1968).
- Lipschutz, Mark R. and Rasmussen, R. Kent. Dictionary of African historical biography. 2nd Edition. University of California Press, 1989. ISBN 0-520-06611-1.
- Sarr, Alioune. Histoire du Sine-Saloum. Introduction, bibliographie et Notes par Charles Becker, BIFAN, Tome 46, Serie B, n° 3-4, 1986–1987.
- Thiam, Iba Der. Maba Diakhou Bâ, Almamy du Rip (Sénégal), Paris, ABC, Dakar-Abidjan, NEA, 1977, p44.
