= Somb =

Town in Senegal

Coordinates: 14°25′N 16°13′W

Somb (in Serer, also Som or Sombe) is a town in Senegal situated in the west of the country.

== History ==
Somb figured prominently in Serer religious affairs for a long part of its history. It takes its name from the Somb tree (Latin : prosopis africana a species of prosopis) the symbol of immortality in the Serer creation myth. The Somb tree was used for burial purposes. The wood is very strong and resistant to rot. It is the wood found in many of the Serer tumuli which are still intact after a thousand years.

The Battle of Fandane-Thiouthioune (18 July 1867) more commonly known as the Battle of Somb took place in the vicinity of this town. In that battle, Maba Diakhou Bâ tried to launch jihad against the Serer people of Sine but was defeat by the King of Sine Maad a Sinig Kumba Ndoffene Famak Joof.

== Administration ==
Somb is a town in the Département of Gossas, in the region of Fatick. It is part of the rural community of Patar Lia.

== Geography ==
The nearest towns are Djilassene, Ndiayene, Ndiok Doumaleourou, Dok, Kodieri, Koral and the two historical towns of Fandène, Tioutoune (or Thiouthioune).

== Notable people ==
- Yandé Codou Sène (1932–2010), the Serer Diva and griot of president Léopold Sédar Senghor
