= Fandène =

Village in Senegal

Coordinates: 14°27′N 16°55′W

Fandène (Serer : Fanđan, or Fandane or Mbel Fandane) is a small village in Senegal about 7 km from Thiès. It is inhabited by the Serer people.

== History ==
Fandène or Fandane was one of the villages of the precolonial Serer Kingdom of Sine. On 18 July 1867 at the Battle of Fandane-Thiouthioune (commonly known as the Battle of Somb), a war took place there at the stream of Fandane between the Serer people (followers of Serer religion) led by their King Maad a Sinig Kumba Ndoffene Famak Joof and his army and the Muslim Marabouts of Senegambia led by Maba Diakhou Bâ and his army. The Serer forces defeated the Muslim Marabouts when they tried to launch a jihad and conquer Sine. Maba Diakhou Bâ was killed in that battle.

== Population ==
About 5000 inhabitants

== Geography ==
The closest localities are Thies, Lalane, Somb, Mont-rolland, Peykouk, Keur Dembaand Keur Diour, Thiouthioune.

== Activities ==
A traditional market is held there every Wednesday. In January 2011, The Festival of Farmer's Seeds was also held there.

== See also ==
- Serer people
- Kingdom of Sine
- Kingdom of Saloum
- Serer religion

== Bibliography ==
- (in French) M. B. Gueye, Conflits et alliances entre agriculteurs et éleveurs : le cas du Goll de Fandène, IIED Dryland Network Programme Issue Paper n° 49, 1994
- (in French) Abbé Ruffray, « Fandène en liesse, fête le jubilé de ses premiers chrétiens », Horizons africains, n° 136, février 1962, p. 10-12
- Sarr, Alioune, Histoire du Sine-Saloum, Introduction, bibliographie et Notes par Charles Becker, BIFAN, Tome

46, Serie B, n° 3–4, 1986–1987. pp 37–39

- Gravrand, Henry, La civilisation sereer, vol. II : Pangool, Nouvelles éditions africaines, Dakar, 1990, p 474, ISBN 2-7236-1055-1
