= Djun djun =

Djun djun may refer to:

- a Western misnomer for dunun, a cylindrical drum of the Malinké people
- Dundun, an hourglass-shaped talking drum of the Yoruba people
- Junjung, a war drum of the Serer people.
