= Xooy =

Serer divination ceremony

The Xooy (meaning "macerate" or "call" in Serer, sometimes spelled Xoy or Khoy) is a Serer divination ceremony held once a year in Fatick, Senegal. The Xooy is one of the most important and well known ceremonies in the Serer religious calendar, and is a national event in Senegal's cultural calendar which attracts government officials and dignitaries. The ceremony is held yearly at the Centre MALANGO in Sine, Senegal and attracts a large crowd from Senegal, and Serers from neighbouring Gambia and the diaspora. It is somewhat of a yearly pilgrimage. The Lebou also attend the ceremony in homage to their Serer ancestors. The Lebou genies are actual the Serer pangool. The Xooy takes place around late May early June before the rainy season where the Serer high priests and priestesses—the Saltigue dressed in their traditional gowns and hats takes centre stage to divine the future. There is a master of ceremonies, and as the public are seated in a circle, each Saltigue enters the circle in turn and give their divination on matters relating to the weather, politics, economics, health, etc. The ceremony goes on for two days (sometimes more)—and throughout the night—accompanied by the rhythm of drums. The Serer people have traditionally been farmers, cattle herders, boat builders and fisher people. The Xooy therefore serves both a religious and agricultural function.

The Xooy should not be confused with the Raan festival, which is another major event in the Serer religious calendar. The Xooy is organized by MALANGO, whilst the Raan is organized and presided over by the Joof family—at their ancestral home in Tukar. The Xooy takes place in late May early June, whilst the Raan takes place yearly on the second Thursday in April after the appearance of the new moon

On the last day of the Xooy ceremony, the Serer cosmological star Yoonir is drawn on the ground and surrounded by saltigues and watchers. A fire is lit, and a calabash containing sacred water is placed by its side. A priest would then sip some of the water and blow it onto the fire. This ritual pays homage to the elements of earth, water and fire, and the significance of the star in Serer primordial time. This in essence signals the beginning of the Serer New Year which starts in the month of O nGool ɓetaafoleng (in Serer; Gam in Saafi)—corresponding to the month of June in the Gregorian calendar. The Serer saying Ngam jam, o yas jam (Rain in peace! Sow in peace!) are the first words Serer farmers say to one another during the first rain. It is also the way Serers wish each other Happy New Year! This saying is also a prayer.

The late Saltigue Biram Pouye from Diobass, Senegal, was one of the renowned saltigues of his generation. However, he stopped attending the event, but instead, used to send his messenger every year to Fatick MALANGO to deliver his divination to the public. Saltigue Khane Diouf is another revered Saltigue who historically have had a high accuracy record in her predictions.

The Xooy was added to UNESCO's Intangible Cultural Heritage List in 2013.

== Controversy ==
In recent years, some followers of Serer religion, as well as Serer organizations like the Seereer Resource Centre (SRC) and Seereer Radio have criticised the organizers (MALANGO) for their over-commercialization of this sacred ceremony, and for the ceremony not being a true reflection of how their Serer ancestors used to do it. In this regard, the Seereer Resource Centre has been extremely vocal about some of the Saltigue allowed to participate in this sacred ceremony, who proclaim themselves as bona fides saltigues—but whom the SRC refer to as "charlatans proclaiming themselves as genuine saltigis." Yet, "have neither been initiated nor do they adhere to the tenets of Seereer/African spirituality."

== See also ==
- Lamane
- Serer creation myth
- African divination

== Bibliography ==
- Kalis, Simone, Médecine traditionnelle, religion et divination ches les Seereer Siin du Sénégal – La connaissance de la nuit, L'Harmattan (1997), pp. 51, 60, 139, 173, 177, 213. 300 ISBN 2-7384-5196-9
- UNESCO, Xooy, a divination ceremony among the Serer of Senegal. UNESCO Culture Sector (retrieved 3 March 2020)
- Biagetti, Stefano; Lugli, Francesca; The Intangible Elements of Culture in Ethnoarchaeological Research, Springer (2016), p. 78, ISBN 9783319231532 (retrieved 3 March 2020)
- Africa Consultants International (2000), Yëgóo: magazine d'échanges inter-culturels, Issues 0-11, p. lix
- Dione, Salif, L'appel du ndut: ou, L'initiation des garçons seereer, IFAN (2004), pp. 43, 144, ISBN 9789291300471
- Galvan, Dennis Charles, The State Must Be Our Master of Fire: How Peasants Craft Culturally Sustainable Development in Senegal. Berkeley, University of California Press, 2004, p. 202, ISBN 0-520-23591-6
- Gravrand, Henry, La Civilisation Sereer - "Pangool", vol. 2. Les Nouvelles Editions Africaines du Senegal (1990), ISBN 2-7236-1055-1
