= Thiouthioune =

Coordinates: 14.4500°N 16.2167°W

Thiouthioune (in Serer) is a village in Senegal (rural community of Diakhao, Fatick Region) located in the pre-colonial Serer Kingdom of Sine. The current population is estimated at 763. The Battle of Fandane-Thiouthioune (18 July 1867) commonly known as "the Battle of Somb" took place within the vicinity of this village. In that battle, the Serer strategy - led by their king Maad a Sinig Kumba Ndoffene Famak Joof was to prevent the Muslim marabouts of Senegambia who came to launch jihad from entering Thiouthioune. Initially, the Muslims successfully broke the Serer lines and entered Thiouthioune. However, at the later stages of the battle, the Muslims were defeated by the Serer forces and Serer religion was installed. The leader of the Muslim army was decapitated in that battle under the orders of the Maad a Sinig. The sovereign of Thiouthioune in 1867 was Maad Amad Ngoneh Joof, commonly known as Amad Ngoneh Thiouthioune (Amad Ngoneh of Thiouthioune). He was the paternal uncle of the king of Sine (the Maad a Sinig). He and his army also fought in the battle to defeat the Marabouts.

== See also ==
- Fandène
- Somb
