= Maba Diakhou Bâ =

Senegalese Muslim leader (1809 – 1867)

Mamadu Diakhou Bâ (1809 – July 1867) was a Muslim leader in Senegambia (West Africa) during the 19th century. He was a disciple of the Tijaniyya Sufi brotherhood and became the Almami of Saloum.

Maba Diakhou Bâ combined political and religious goals in an attempt to reform or overthrow previous animist monarchies, and resist French encroachment. He is a part of a tradition of Fulani jihad leaders who revolutionized many West African states during the 19th century.

In the 19th century, he became a prominent Muslim cleric and slave trader and pillager of non-Muslim states.

== Spelling variations ==
- In Serer: Ma Ba Jaxu and Ama Ba Jaxu (or Amat Jaxu Ba)
- Maba Jaxu
- Maba Jahou Bah
- Ma Ba Diakhu
- Ma Ba Diakho Ba
- Mabba Jaxu Ba

== Early life ==
A descendant of the Fulani Denianke Dynasty, Amath Ba was born in 1809 in the region of Rip, also known as Badibu. His grandfather had immigrated from Futa Toro, and the family were all teachers of the Quran. Maba studied in Cayor and taught in the Kingdom of Jolof, his mother's native land, where he married a member of the royal family. In 1846, he likely met El Hadj Umar Tall, who named him the Tijani leader for the region. He returned to Rip around 1850, and spent ten years teaching and preaching in the village of Keur Maba Diakhou near Kaolack.

During this time, French forces under governor Faidherbe had carried out a scorched-earth policy against resistance to their expansion in Senegambia, with villages razed and populations removed after each victory.

== Beginnings of Jihad ==
The king of Badibou (Rip) in the 1850s was entitled Mansa Jeriba. He was a weak ruler, and his warriors would frequently raid marabout villages in the area. Maba was the court marabout, frequently making amulets and praying for the king, but also attempting to weaken him by magical means and stockpiling weaponry. When the marabouts retaliated against the ceddo (animist) warriors for a raid, the king tried to crush them but Maba and his talibes (students) defeated them. This success attracted more supporters, and by 1861 Maba controlled all of Rip. At this point he launched his jihad into Serer territory and soon controlled most of Saloum and part of Niumi. He founded the city of Nioro as his capital, named after El Hadj Umar's capital.

== Expansion and War ==
In 1862, the former Damel of Cayor Macodou Coumba Fall took refuge with Maba. Twice their combined forces defeated Fall's son Samba Laobe, the Maad Saloum, but on October 2nd they failed to take the French fortifications at Kaolack, where Laobe had taken refuge. Still, Maba now controlled most of Saloum, and enforced his interpretation of Islam throughout the country, burning and enslaving villages that resisted. In 1863 a group of animist Mandinka chiefs of Rip, assisted by Kiang and Wuli, counter-attacked and defeated the marabout forces at Kwinella.

In May 1864, Lat Dior, Damel of Cayor, was overthrown by a French-supported rival. Maba Diakhou Bâ offered him asylum, and converted Dior and his soldiers from the traditional Tièddo syncretic beliefs to rigorous Islam. While his conversion may have been for reasons more political than spiritual, Lat Dior became a powerful ally. With his support, Maba's movement became more than a civil war in Saloum and grew to impact the entire region. Maba would also convert Alboury Ndiaye, the Buur of the Kingdom of Jolof, to Islam. This marked a decisive turning point in the history of Islam among the Wolof.

Maba's forces now numbered up to 11,000 fighting men. In October 1864 the French recognized him as Almamy of Baddibu and Saloum. In the spring of 1865 Lat Dior led an army to conquer the Kingdom of Jolof, alarming the French. The marabout forces repeatedly defeated the Jolof-Jolof, and entered the capital of Warkhokh in July. Maba attempted to build alliances with the neighboring Emirate of Trarza and the Imamate of Futa Toro, threatening to unify Senegambia against the French, but a rebellion in Rip forced him to leave Jolof in October after burning several animist villages and enslaving the inhabitants.

An alarmed French governor Émile Pinet-Laprade marched on Saloum at the head of 1,600 regulars, 2,000 cavalry, and 4,000 volunteers and footsoldiers. At the Battle of Pathé Badiane outside of Nioro on November 30th, however, the marabout forces led by Lat Dior drove the French back towards Kaolack.

== Islamization and reform ==
As well as converting traditional states and their populations to Islam, Maba Diakhou Bâ's forces sought to abolish the traditional caste system of the Wolof and Serer aristocratic states. In unifying with other Muslim forces, West African Jihad states aimed to end the reign of small regional kingships who kept the area in a constant state of war, and the farming and artisanal classes in slave conditions. This centralization caused friction within his realm, as Mandinka people near the Gambia River resented being ruled by Wolof judges from the north. The Toucouleur Empire of El Hadj Umar Tall in Mali, which rose at about the same time, had much the same goals, and Umar Tall himself was in contact with and recruited among Maba Diakhou Bâ's forces.

== Slave trading activities ==
Maba was a prominent Muslim cleric and slave trader that ravaged non-Muslim states. Historian, Professor Klein notes that, "When a British Emissary told him famine would result from his ravaging, he replied "God is our father, and has brought this war. We are in his hands."

== Death and legacy ==
In 1866, Maba Diakhou Bâ invaded the Kingdom of Sine, still led by the animist Serer ruler Kumba Ndoffene Diouf. With a surprise attack he captured and burned the capital of Diakhao. On April 20th 1867 he defeated and killed the French captain Le Creurer at Thiofack. On July 18th, The Rip forces faced the Serer armies at the Battle of Fandane-Thiouthioune. A rainstorm rendered the Muslim guns useless, Maba's troops were routed and he himself was killed.

With the continued resistance of Sine, much of Serer territory remained animist or Christian into the 20th century. Sine resistance was likely as much nationalist as religious, with Muslims and animists fighting on both sides of these struggles.

Maba Diakhou Bâ is an important link in the tradition of Senegalese marabouts who trace their lineage to Umar Tall. This tradition has continued to the present, with such notables as El Hadj Saidou Nourou Tall (the former grand marabout of French West Africa) the Tivaouane-based Sy family of El Hadj Malik Sy (1855–1922), and the Niass family of Abdoulaye Niasse (1840–1922) and his son Ibrahim in Kaolack. Tivaouane in the north among the Wolof and Kaolack among the Serer have become the two centers of Tijaniyyah Sufi teaching in Senegal, and both were founded as a direct result of Maba Diakhou Bâ's short-lived state.

He was interred in the village of Fandène (or Mbel Fandane), and his tomb, which has become a place of pilgrimage, is in the Diakhao Arrondissement, département of Fatick in Sine-Saloum, Sénégal.

== See also ==
- Soninke-Marabout Wars
- Maad a Sinig Kumba Ndoffene Famak Joof
- The Battle of Fandane-Thiouthioune
- Muslim brotherhoods of Senegal
- The Tijaniyyah Expansion in West Africa
