= Kumba Ndoffene Famak Joof =

King of Sine (1810–1871)

Kumba Ndoffene Famak Joof (Kumba Ndoofeen fa Maak Juuf)
- King Kumba Ndoffene Famak Joof, as depicted at the Historical Museum of Senegal in Gorée

King of Sine.
- Reign: 1853 – 23 August 1871
- Coronation of Maad a Sinig Kumba Ndoffene Famak Joof: 1853
- Predecessor: Ama Joof Gnilane Faye Joof
- Heir-apparent: Sanmoon Faye
- Born: 1810; Kingdom of Sine (in present-day Senegal)
- Died: 23 August 1871 (aged 60–61)
Names
- Kumba Ndoffene Famak Joof
- House: The Royal House of Semou Njekeh Joof founded by Semou Njekeh Joof in the 18th century
- Father: Souka Ndela Joof
- Mother: Lingeer Gnilane Jogoy Joof
- Religion: Serer religion

Kumba Ndoffene Famak Joof (Serer: Kumba Ndoofeen fa Maak Juuf, (Note: Other spelling/variations: Mad a Sinig Kumba Ndoffene Famak Joof, Mad a Sinig Coumba Ndoffène Fa mak Diouf, Coumba N'Doffène Diouf, Coumba N'Doffène Diouf I, Maat Sine Kumba Ndoffene Famak Joof, etc.)c. 1810 – 23 August 1871) was the Maad a Sinig (Note: Variations: Bour Sine or Mad a Sinig) ("King of Sine" in Serer) in modern-day Senegal. He ruled from 1853 until his death on 23 August 1871. He was the son of Souka Ndela Joof and Lingeer Gnilane Jogoy Joof. His father Souka Ndela came from the Royal House of Semou Njekeh Joof founded by Semou Njekeh Joof in the early 18th century, the third and last royal house founded by the Joof family of Sine and Saloum. His paternal family ruled three kingdoms: Sine, Saloum, and Baol. They traced descent to Ndaah Njemeh Joof, the 13th century King of Laah (or Lâ) in Baol.

Kumba Ndoffene Famak's mother, Lingeer Gnilane Jogoy Joof, came from the Guelowar maternal dynasty. The Guelowars had ruled two Senegambian Kingdoms, Sine and Saloum. They had also provided two kings of Jolof and heirs to the thrones of Cayor and Baol. According to oral tradition, they originated from the royal family of Kaabu in the 14th century who were granted asylum by the Serer nobility of Sine (the lamanes) following some dynastic struggle in Kaabu with the Nianco dynasty. The name Famak (Serer proper: fa Maak) means the Elder in Serer. He should not be confused with his successor Kumba Ndoffene Fa Ndeb Joof who reigned from c. 1898 to 1924. The name fa Ndeb/Fandeb (Serer: fa Ndeb) means the Younger in Serer. The prefix Famak is a later addition in order to differentiate him from his successor, who is sometimes referred to as Kumba Ndoffene II.

== Succession and coronation ==
Serer royal and religious titles
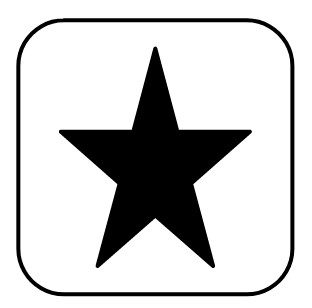
- Royal titles
- Lamane (also religious)
- Maad
- Maad a Sinig
- Maad Saloum
- Teigne
- Lingeer
- Line of succession
- Buumi
- Thilas
- Loul Religious titles
- Saltigue

Kumba Ndoffene Famak succeeded to the throne in 1853 following the death of the young Ama Joof Gnilane Faye Joof. He was crowned in September 1853 by the Great Jaraaf (head of the Noble Council of Electors responsible for electing kings from the royal family). Guests included his paternal and maternal family as well as the dignitaries of Sine. His succession to the throne went unchallenged during the 19th century.

== External threats ==
The reign of Maad Kumba Ndoffene Famak was in constant threat by two external forces : the French who wanted to extend their authority in his Kingdom following the defeat of Waalo under Lingeer Ndateh Yalla Mboge and by Tafsir Amat Jahu Bah more commonly known as Maba Diakhou Bâ who wanted to Islamize the Animist Serer people of Sine and Saloum.

== Leadership style ==
Maad a Sinig Kumba Ndoffene Famak was a very strong leader whose word was generally accepted by the French. However, sometimes he had his reasons for giving very limited protection to the French merchants and even less protection to the French missionaries, whom he regarded as spies of the French administration in Senegal and the French government in Paris. This rumour was first circulated by his predecessor — Maad a Sinig Ama Joof Gnilane Faye Joof, who stopped the French from building any bricked chapel or church in his Kingdom. During the first few years of Maad Kumba Ndoffene Famak's reign, the Mission at N'Gasobil faced constant harassments designed to force their departure. The people were not only ordered not to sell anything to the mission, but also not to send their children to Christian schools in fear that the mission would corrupt the minds of the young.

In 1856, Father Lamoise and Kobes (accompanied by French officers) went to Sine to see Maad Kumba Ndoffene Famak. They presented their complaints to the king about the constant harassments which began during the reign of Maad Ama Joof Gnilane Faye Joof. Lamoise also used the meeting to seek the king's permission to build a brick chapel. Permission was not granted. Lamoise threatened to build a brick chapel with or without the king's permission. Maad Kumba Ndoffene Famak threatened to kill Lamoise if he dared to disobey his orders. Nothing was achieved by the French in that meeting.

Maad a Sinig Kumba Ndoffene was related to the other Senegambian royal families (Jolof, Cayor, Baol, Waalo and Saloum) and was known for giving asylum to the royal families of those kingdoms, so much so that the French governor of Senegal at the time—Pinet Laprade used to refer to him as "the King of Kings."

== Siege of Kaolack ==
In 1866, the French governor Émile Pinet-Laprade tried to encourage resettlement around Kaolack (a province of the Kingdom of Saloum) and promised to restore order and trade there. He failed to achieve that. Kaolack which was previously sacked by the Muslim marabouts in 1865 falls within the jurisdiction of Saloum, ruled by the Maad Saloum (king of Saloum), and not by the Maad a Sinig (king of Sine). It was part of the jurisdiction of Maad Saloum Fakha Boya Latsouka Fall. The King of Sine (Maad a Sinig Kumba Ndoffene Famak) was not willing to persuade his people to settle in a war zone.

Laprade (and his predecessors Faidherbe and Jauréguibéry) who previously had nothing good to say about the Serers, referring to them "drunkards" and "violent against the Muslims" now needed Maad Kumba Ndoffene Famak's assistance to solve the problem in Kaolack. He wrote several letters to Maad Kumba Ndoffene Famak begging him to do something. To secure the support of Maad Kumba Ndoffene Famak, Laprade changed his strategy by calling the Muslim marabouts "thieves".

When Maad Kumba Ndoffene Famak tried to offer help to the King of Saloum (Fakha Boya Latsouka Fall), the King of Saloum turned him down and refused to listen to him. According to some (such as Klein, Bâ, etc.), Fakha Boya was a weak king who was unwilling or unable to solve the Kaolack problem, his own province. However, the consensus is that, the sacking of Kaolack by the marabout forces would not have happened without Laprade. It was Laprade who initially asked Fakha Boya whether he could withdraw his army from the Kaolack post for a short period so that trade could resume with the marabouts. That was after he tried and failed to conquer the Kingdom of Saloum. When King Fakha Boya withdrew his army from the Kaolack post, Laprade immediately informed Maba Diakhou Ba in July 1864 that the army of Fakha Boya had left and he can come back. When the marabout came, they ransacked and looted Kaolack and virtually control it. As the situation worsened in Kaolack, Maad Fakha Boya lost all control in Kaolack, and the marabouts were no longer willing to listen to Laprade. As such, Laprade lost all influence he had on the marabouts and needed Maad Kumba Ndoffene Famak's assistance to deal with the problem.

== Maad Kumba Ndoffene Famak against the Muslim marabouts ==
Maad Kumba Ndoffene Famak resisted against French expansionism, and the strategy of the French to use him against Maba Diakhou Bâ. According to some, had he accepted the French's terms and strategy, Maba would have been killed in the 1850s. Émile Pinet-Laprade mistook that for cowardice which was not the case.

However in 1867, Maba Diakhou who had avoided the animist Kingdom of Sine for six years decided to launch a jihad in the Sine. The British administration in the Gambia and the French administration in Senegal had both tried to get rid of Maba Diakhou when relations broke down, but failed. Governor George Abbas Kooli D'Arcy (the British governor in the Gambia) was arming Maba and the marabout forces with British weapons. He also planned and executed the invasion of the Mandinka animist State of Baddibu in the Gambia in a revenge attack against the British traders by animist Baddibu. D'Arcy planned his invasion to coincide with the French's unsuccessful invasion of animist Serer Saloum in 1861.

Almost a week after Maba's victory in Kaolack, a large group of his disciples entered Sine. Maba himself did not enter Sine. The battle was indecisive as the marabout forces withdrew when they realised that they could not penetrate Sine.

=== The surprise of Mbin o Ngor (Mbetaan Keur Ngor) ===
Mbin o Ngor (var: Mbon o NGOOR) is a small Serer village in Sine. The Surprise of Mbin o Ngor in 1867 was not an open battle. It was a surprise attack by the marabouts against the Serer community of this village. The Wolof term for it is "Mbetaan Keur Ngor" which means "the surprise attack of Keur Ngor". "Mbetaan" means surprise. In the Serer language, the incident is known as "Mbin o Ngor".

In the Serer oral tradition, the incident occurred on a Wednesday. In those days taxes were collected on Wednesdays. That day Maad Kumba Ndoffene Famak also attended the funeral of one of his warriors. It was the funeral of Dyé Tyass, one of the warriors of Sine. Maad Kumba Ndoffene Famak and his entourage were also later obliged to participate in the final phase of the ceremony of the newly circumcised young boys of Somb. This festival is one of the last phases of the initiation were they perform a dance before the king and the rest of the royal family who in turn give them gifts for their courage. The funeral of Dyé Tyass coincided with this ceremony and the King's secretary was told by the King to inform the initiates he will meet them later at Mbin o Ngor after the funeral at Dielem. Historians and theologians note that, in Serer religion, "funerals are the occasion of much eating and drinking" - celebrating the life of the departed as they make their journey to the next life. Therefore, apart from attacking civilians, Sine's defenses would have been down.

The King of Cayor - Damel Lat Dior Ngoné Latyr Diop is said to be the instigator of this surprise attack. Lat Dior who is reported to have had a long grudge against Maad Kumba Ndoffene Famak after his defeat and exile by the French administration at the Battle of Loro (January 12, 1864) sought refuge in Sine. Maad Kumba Ndoffene Famak granted him asylum. Oral tradition says Lat Dior was well received in Sine. Lat Dior also needed military support from Maad Kumba Ndoffene Famak in order to launch a war against the French and regain his throne. Maad Kumba Ndoffene Famak was unable to provide military support to Lat Dior, because he was involved in a long battle against the French administration regarding the sovereignty of Joal (a province of Sine). Lat Dior sought military support from Maba. Maba promised to help Lat Dior if he converts to Islam. Lat Dior converted to Islam, and in 1867, persuaded Maba to launch a jihad in the Kingdom of Sine.

There is no consensus as to whether Maba went to Mbin o Ngor or not. Serer oral sources gives detailed account of the incident, incriminating several prominent members of the marabout movement some of which include Lat Dior and Gumbo Gaye. Serer oral tradition says that Maba went to Mbin o Ngor and it was he who killed Boucary Ngoneh Joof (many variations: Boucar Ngoné Diouf - a cousin and brother-in-law of Maad Kumba Ndoffene Famak who is reported to have sacrificed his life in the incident in order to preserve the honour of Sine). Muslim marabout oral sources agree pretty much with Serer sources, except that Maba did not go to Mbin o Ngor (Keur Ngor, in Wolof). When Maat Kumba Ndoffene Famak finally managed to mobilize the army of Sine, the marabout army retreated. However, before their retreat, they had managed to cause serious damage in Sine and kidnapped some prominent princesses of Sine including the daughter of Maad Kumba Ndoffene Famak (Lingeer Selbeh Ndoffene Joof). During her abduction, Lingeer Selbeh Ndoffene was given in marriage to Abdoulaye Wuli Bâ (brother of Maba).

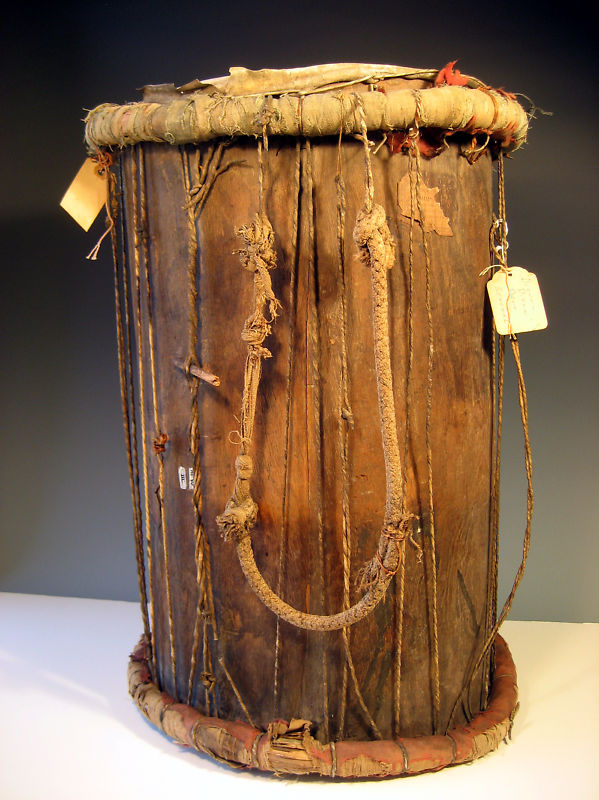
A 19th-century royal war drum, called junjung in Serer. It was played when Serer kings and warriors went to war. From the Kingdom of Sine, now part of Senegal.

=== The Battle of Fandane-Thiouthioune (Somb) ===
After the surprise attack at Mbin o Ngor, Maad Kumba Ndoffene Famak wrote a letter to Maba Diakhou Bâ telling him that the surprise attack he launched in Sine was undignified and invited him to an open battle. On 18 July 1867, Maba and his army came. In this battle - The Battle of Fandane-Thiouthioune (commonly known as the Battle of Somb), Maba Diakhou Bâ was defeated. He died in this battle and his body was decapitated. Maba's brother (Abdoulaye Wuli Bâ) was not killed in this battle. He was castrated.

== Death ==
Maad a Sine Kumba Ndoffene Famak Joof was assassinated in Joal by the French in August 1871. He went to Joal to exercise his authority over the sovereignty of Joal. The French claimed they never gave an official order to assassinate the King, and blamed a French drunkard and merchant by the name Baccaria. None of the credible historians believe them.

== Legacy ==
It was during Maad a Sinig Kumba Ndoffene Famak Joof's reign that an old traditional Serer song and proverb were officially adopted as the national anthem and motto of Sine. The song sang in his honour after his victory at The Battle of Fandane-Thiouthioune is still chanted by the Serer people of Sine and Saloum. Maad a Sinig Kumba Ndoffene Famak Joof is still admired by the Serer people for resisting against French colonialism, securing the independence of Sine and the safety of his people. It was after his death that the kings of Sine succeeded one another at an astounding rate.

"Maba Diakhou, the fighter of the faith died in the land of Sine without ever managing to Islamize the country deeply rooted in centuries old belief. The glorious epic of Islam in the land of Senegambia did not spread to "Ceddo" (Animist) Sine, who were determined to reject forever the religion that threatened the faith of their forefathers and to rule their lives in defiance of their customs. The Sine is an impregnable bastion of the anti-Islamic."

— Iba Der Thiam

For the Serers who adhere to Serer religion, Maad Kumba Ndoffene Famak is also admired for defeating the marabouts who threatened the religion of their forefathers. He was a valiant warrior and a strong leader whose succession to the throne went unchallenged in the 19th century. His victory at The Battle of Fandane-Thiouthioune is deemed by some historians (such as Klein, Bâ, Thiam, C. Diouf, etc.) as the division of Senegambian communities between Muslims and followers of Serer religion.

== Genealogy ==
The following genealogy gives the line of descent from Maad a Sinig Kumba Ndoffene Famak Joof to his ancestor Maad Semou Njekeh Joof, founder of The Royal House of Semou Njekeh Joof in the 18th century. It was the third and last Royal House founded by the Joof Dynasty of Sine and Saloum during the Guelowar period. The first being the Royal House of Boureh Gnilane Joof, founded in the 14th century, followed by the Royal House of Jogo Siga Joof. The first King to rule the Kingdom of Sine from the Royal House of Semou Njekeh Joof was Maad a Sinig Boukar Tjilas Sanghaie Joof (Boukar Tjilas Sanghaie Diouf, French spelling in Senegal, - reigned: 1724 - 1735) son of Maad Semou Njekeh.

Genealogy of Maad a Sinig Kumba Ndoffene fa Maak Joof

16. Buka Choro Joof; (of Tagdiam) (Prince of Sine)
8. Maad Semou Njekeh Joof; (King of Tagdiam, Sine); Founder of the Royal House of Semou Njekeh Joof _______; Maad Semou Njekeh Joof had multiple wives and at least thirty-five children in total. One of his wives Lingeer Yandeh Mbouna Faye from the Faye royal family of Sine, was the mother Maad a Sinig Boukar Tjilas Sanghaie Joof, the first Maad a Sinig from Mbind Sem-Jike.
4. Biram Baro Joof; (var: Biram Mbarou Joof) (Prince of Sine) _______; Paternal half-brother of Buka Cilaas Yandeh Mbouna Joof (né. Ngari Yandeh Mbouna (of Tagdiam)) who was the father of the warlord Sandigui Ndiob Niokhobai Joof, father of Kumba Ndoffene fa Maak Joof's mother (Lingeer Gnilane Jogoy Joof), Lingeer Kot Faal Joof (mother of Maad a Sinig Sanmoon Faye), and Maad a Sinig Ama Joof Gnilane Faye Joof (Kumba Ndoffene's maternal uncle and predecessor).
9. Mbarou; (of Sine)
2. Maad Souka Ndela Joof; (Prince of Sine); Commonly known as Souka Ndela Guigneba Foudal. _______; He was the paternal half-brother of Maad Amad Ngoneh Joof (King of Thiouthioune), whose army participated in the Battle of Fandane-Thiouthioune against the Muslim Marabouts.
10. ?
5. Lingeer Ndela Ndaw; Princess of Saloum
11. ?
1. Maad a Sinig Kumba Ndoffene fa Maak Joof; c. 1810 — 23 August 1871 (King of Sine); Reigned: 1853 — 23 August 1871; Assassinated at Joal; Buried at Diakhao (at the burial ground of the Serer Kings of Sine) _______ Full blood siblings Lingeer Selbe Nyadi Joof (Queen Mother of Sine), married to Boucary Ngoneh Joof (Prince of Sine, cousin and advisor of Kumba Ndoffene fa Maak Joof), and from that marriage, begot Maad a Sinig Semou Maak Joof (King of Sine); Lingeer Goumb Joof; Lingeer Goumbo Ndeb Joof (commonly known as Goumbo Mou Ndaw); and Lingeer Njem Joof. Boucary Ngoneh Joof (the matyr at Mbin o Ngoor), was also a direct paternal descendant of Semou Njikeh from a different branch of the family tree. Children Lingeer Selbeh Ndoffene Joof (Princess of Sine); Sandigui Biram Mbarou Joof (Prince of Sine); and Lam Souka Mboul Joof (Prince of Sine & Lamane).
12. Buka Cilaas Yandeh Mbouna Joof; né. Ngari Yandeh Mbouna (of Tagdiam) (Buka Cilaas, Prince of Sine) _______; He is the son of Maad Semou Njekeh Joof and Lingeer Yande Mbouna Faye.
6. Sandigui Ndiob Niokhobai Joof (the warlord); (Sandigui of Ndiob & Prince of Sine)
13. ?
3. Lingeer Gnilane Jogoy Joof; (Princess & Queen Mother of Sine); Also known as Fan Kumba Ndoffene _______; She was the full blood sister of Maad a Sinig Ama Joof Gnilane Faye Joof, Lingeer Kot Faal Joof (Queen Mother of Sine), Lingeer Seum Mbaba Joof, and Lingeer Njem. Lingeer Kot Faal Joof was married off to Prince of Sine Abdoulaye Jimborr Faye of Taa'boor matriclan, and from that marriage, begot Maad a Sinig Sanmoon Faye (né. Biram Kodu Faye, King of Sine), and Lingeer Sanou Faye.
14. ?
7. Lingeer Gnilane Faye; (Queen Mother of Sine) _______; From her first marriage, she had Maad a Sinig Njak Gnilane Faye, King of Sine in c. 1837
15. ?

== See also ==
- Amar Godomat
- Issa Laye Thiaw

== Bibliography ==
- Klein, Martin A. Islam and Imperialism in Senegal Sine-Saloum, 1847–1914, p. 106. Published by Edingburg University Press (1968). ISBN 0-85224-029-5
- Faal, Dawda. Peoples and empires of Senegambia: Senegambia in history, AD 1000–1900. p. 84. Saul's Modern Printshop, 1991
- Diouf, Niokhobaye. "Chronique du royaume du Sine." Suivie de notes sur les traditions orales et les sources écrites concernant le royaume du Sine par Charles Becker et Victor Martin. (1972). Bulletin de l'Ifan, Tome 34, Série B, n° 4, (1972).
- Thiaw, Issa Laye. "La Religiousite des Sereer, Avant et Pendant Leur Islamisation." Ethiopiques, No: 54, Revue Semestrielle de Culture Négro-Africaine. Nouvelle Série, Volume 7, 2e Semestre 1991. Aussi: A. Corre. "Les Sérères de Joal et de Portudal. (1883). Paris, Rev.)
- l'epopee de Sanmoon Fay. "La famille Juuf". Ethiopiques n°54 revue semestrielle de culture négro-africaine Nouvelle série volume 7 2e semestre 1991
- Diouf, Cheikh. Fiscalité et Domination Coloniale: l'exrmple du Sine: 1859–1940. Université Cheikh Anta Diop de Dakar—(2005)
- Sarr, Alioune. "Histoire du Sine-Saloum (Sénégal)." Introduction, bibliographie et notes par Charles Becker. Version légèrement remaniée par rapport à celle qui est parue en 1986-87 co 1985.
- Diouf, Mahawa, L'information Historique: L'exemple du Siin. Ethiopiques n°54 revue semestrielle de culture négro-africaine Nouvelle série volume 7 2e semestre 1991
- Thiam, Iba Der, Maba Diakhou Ba Almamy du Rip (Sénégal), Paris, ABC, Dakar-Abidjan, NEA, 1977
- Lanker, Nadine Van & Lussier-Lejeune, Florence. Sénégal. L'homme et la mer, Dossiers Pédagogiques. Année scolaire 2006–2007, Projet Qualité

Preceded by Maad a Sinig Ama Joof Gnilane Faye Joof	Maad a Sinig; 1853–1871	Succeeded by Maad a Sinig Sanmoon Faye
