= Tukar =

Village in Senegal

Tukar (Serer: A Tukaar, other variations: Toukar or Toucar) a large village in Senegal. Attached to the rural community of Ngayokhem, it is located in the area of the pre-colonial Kingdom of Sine, west of Senegal. The population is mostly made up of by the Serers. As of 2006 to 2007, the population was estimated at 3000. Ndokh, which was a colony of Tukar, is now a separate village.

== History ==
According to Serer tradition Tukar was founded by Lamane Jegan Joof (French spelling in Senegal: Lamane Djigan Diouf). There are various versions of the tradition, but the basic story has a hero-migrant, Jegan Joof migrating from Lambaye looking for land to exploit. When he arrived at Tukar, it was nothing more than an inhospitable forest. In accordance with the complex land law system of the Serer people, he was the one who cleared the fields and founded Tukar. His paternal descendants (the Joof family) reigned there for several centuries.

In 1937, Biram Diouf (English spelling in the Gambia: Biram Joof (Note: Joof is the English spelling in the Gambia, a former British colony. Diouf is the French spelling in Senegal, a former French colony. They are the same Serer ethnic group and pronounced the same way in the Serer language. Difference in spelling is due to colonization, with Britain taking Gambia and France taking Senegal. The demacation of these two countries was a result of colonisation. Their surname is spelled Juuf or Juf in Serer language, see Joof family.)), a descendant of Lamane Jegan Joof, was short of money and decided to pawn his family's estate (a form of mortgage known in the Serer language as taile) to Waly Sene, the Jaraff of Tukar (representative of the local king). The Joof family of Tukar almost lost their ancestral land. It took 50 years for a great-grandson of Biram Diouf called Djignak Diouf to eventually repay the descendants of Waly Sene and reclaimed his family's estate.

== Etymology ==
The name Tukar consists of two Serer words: tuuk ("shut up") and kar-kar ("just kidding"). According to Serer oral tradition, an adventurer by the name of Fassamane Thiaw (or Chaw) paid a visit to Lamane Jegan Joof during the harvest season. Lamane Jegan Joof was to have a very good harvest of millet that year and Fassamane Thiaw is reported to have exclaimed, "Ooh, you're going have quite bit of millet!" The Lamane was so surprised he immediately replied: "Tuuk!" - which means "shut up!" in Serer language. He then ordered Fassamane Thiaw to say "kar-kar" ("just kidding"). This is said to be the origin of the name Tukar.

According to historians, Lamane Jegan Joof had certainly been very shocked by the remark of Fassamane Thiaw about his promising harvest, but, above all, the bad spirits could be listening and decide to take revenge as a result of jealousy and introduce plague or locusts. This ancient superstition still prevails in Senegambia. The Serers and other ethnic groups of Senegambia forbid drawing attention to success or good fortune, because they fear that the bad spirits may become jealous and take revenge. If one mistakenly offers a compliment or comment on someone's good harvest, one is expected to quickly add kar-kar (just kidding), to ward off bad luck.

== Status ==
The foundation of Tukar by Jegan Joof is occasionally taught to young children at the local school of Kane Faye. In the Serer religious calendar, the Raan festival is held in Tukar once a year on the second Thursday after the new moon in April. The Pangool of Tukar of is Lunguñ Joof (or Lunguñ Juuf in Serer).

== In popular culture ==
Senegalese artist Angélique Dione's 2017 track Toukar pays homage to Tukar. The track has a salsa vibe in which Angélique, who is a native of Tukar plays the guitar.

== Community life ==
Founded in 1986, the Association of Peasants of Tukar (APT) (French: l'Association des Paysans de Tukar) is a rural association that promotes community cohesion and self-sufficiency. However in the mid-2000s, it had some difficulties and a new organization Bug Saax Of (Serer for "those who love their town") was born.

== See also ==
- Kingdom of Saloum
- Kingdom of Baol
- History of Senegal
