= Nioro du Rip =

Town and commune in Senegal

Ville de Nioro du Rip
- Town and commune
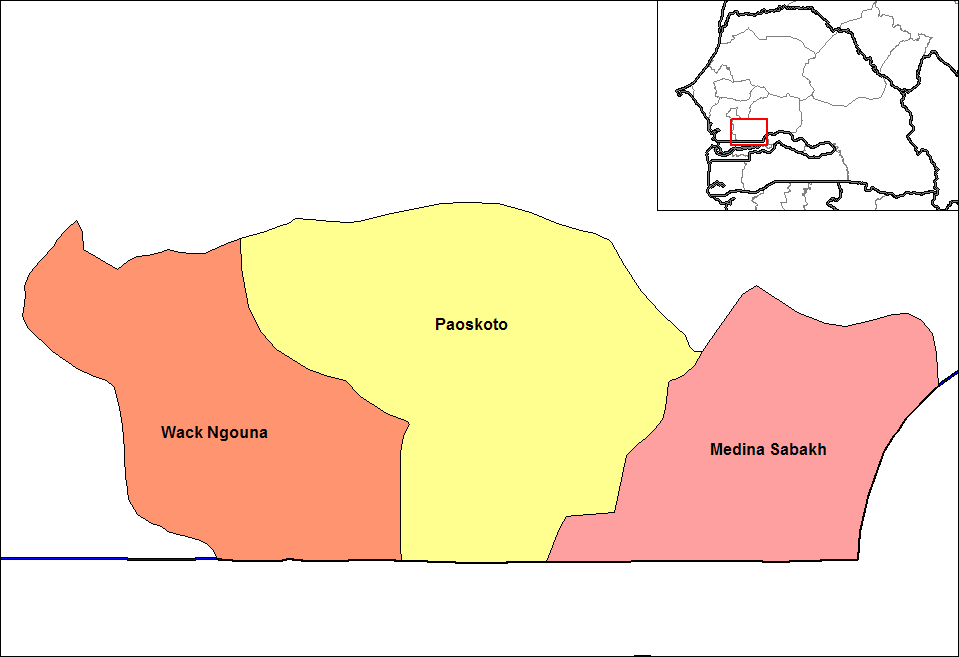
- Arrondissements of the Nioro du Rip Department

- Location in Senegal
- Coordinates: 13°45′N 15°48′W
- Country: Senegal
- Region: Kaolack
- Department: Nioro du Rip

Government
  - Mayor: Modou Mbaye

Area
  - Town and commune: 7.909 km^{2} (3.054 sq mi)
- Elevation: 28 m (92 ft)

Population (2023 census)
  - Town and commune: 28,491
  - Density: 3,602/km^{2} (9,330/sq mi)

Nioro du Rip is a town and urban commune in the south-west of Sénégal, situated about 60 km (37 mi) to the south-west of Kaolack and 27 km (17 mi) from the border with The Gambia.

== History ==
The town of Nioro du Rip was the capital of Rip (a kingdom of the marabout leader Maba Diakhou Bâ). Cheikh Ahmadou Bamba Mbacké (founder of The Mouride brotherhood) at one point lived here. Nioro is near one group of the Senegambian stone circles which date from the eighth century.

== Administration ==
The town is the capital of Nioro du Rip Department, in région of Kaolack.

== Geography ==
Nioro du Rip is on the route nationale N4 which links Kaolack to Ziguinchor via The Gambia. The nearest small towns are Keur Ali Gueye, Paoskoto, Diamaguene, Keur Bidji Ouri, Lougue, Bamba, Bakesaloum, Mbaye Faye Fafa et Mbap.

=== Climate ===
Climate data for Nioro du Rip (1991–2020)
Month	Jan	Feb	Mar	Apr	May	Jun	Jul	Aug	Sep	Oct	Nov	Dec	Year
Mean daily maximum °C (°F)	34.8 (94.6)	37.0 (98.6)	39.2 (102.6)	40.3 (104.5)	39.8 (103.6)	37.1 (98.8)	33.5 (92.3)	32.2 (90.0)	32.5 (90.5)	34.9 (94.8)	36.8 (98.2)	35.4 (95.7)	36.1 (97.0)
Mean daily minimum °C (°F)	15.3 (59.5)	17.4 (63.3)	19.2 (66.6)	20.7 (69.3)	22.4 (72.3)	24.2 (75.6)	24.1 (75.4)	23.8 (74.8)	23.5 (74.3)	23.2 (73.8)	18.8 (65.8)	15.8 (60.4)	20.7 (69.3)
Record low °C (°F)	7.0 (44.6)	11.4 (52.5)	12.0 (53.6)	13.0 (55.4)	17.5 (63.5)	19.5 (67.1)	18.3 (64.9)	13.1 (55.6)	19.5 (67.1)	16.7 (62.1)	11.0 (51.8)	9.0 (48.2)	7.0 (44.6)
Average precipitation mm (inches)	0.0 (0.0)	0.6 (0.02)	0.0 (0.0)	0.0 (0.0)	2.8 (0.11)	53.5 (2.11)	175.9 (6.93)	274.6 (10.81)	214.3 (8.44)	60.2 (2.37)	6.6 (0.26)	0.1 (0.00)	788.6 (31.05)
Average precipitation days (≥ 1.0 mm)	0.0	0.2	0.0	0.0	0.3	3.5	10.3	14.8	12.9	4.4	0.3	0.0	46.7
Source: NOAA

== Bibliography ==
- (English) Ba-Curry, Ginette. In Search of Maba: A 19th Century Epic from Senegambia, West Africa (Preface of the Play by Edris Makward, Emeritus Professor of African Literature, Univ of Wisconsin, U.S.), Phoenix Press International, Maryland, 2011 [Category: Drama].[1]
- (in French) Alioune Touré, La population de Nioro du Rip, du protectorat français (1887) à la veille de la Seconde Guerre mondiale, Université de Dakar, 1987, 6 + 96 p. (Mémoire de Maîtrise)
