= Louis Faidherbe =

French general and colonial administrator (1818–1889)

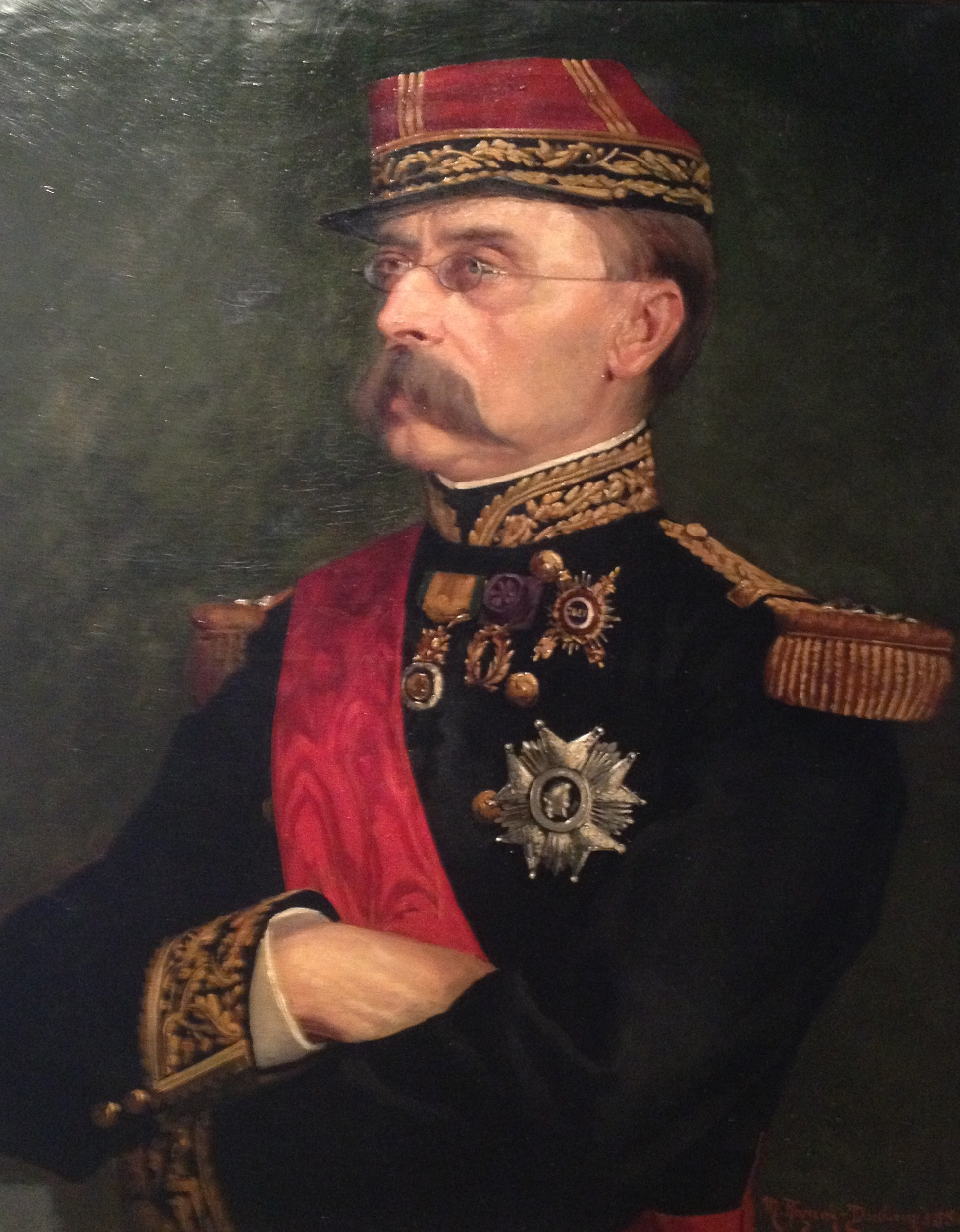
- Louis Léon César Faidherbe
- Born: 3 June 1818; Lille, France
- Died: 29 September 1889 (aged 71); Paris, France
- Military career
- Allegiance: Kingdom of France; French Second Republic; Second French Empire; French Third Republic
- Branch: French Army
- Service years: 1840–1879
- Rank: Général de Division
- Commands: Army of the North
- Conflicts: Franco-Prussian War
- Awards: Grand Cross of the Légion d'honneur
- Other work: Governor of Senegal; Deputy of the National Assembly

Louis Léon César Faidherbe (French pronunciation: [lwi leɔ̃ sezaʁ fedɛʁb]; 3 June 1818 – 29 September 1889) was a French general and colonial administrator. He created the Senegalese Tirailleurs when he was governor of Senegal.

== Early life ==
Faidherbe was born into a lower-middle-class family in Lille. He was the fifth child of Louis César Joseph Faidherde, a hosier who had volunteered as a Republican in the revolutionary war, and his wife, Sophie Monnier. His father died in 1826 when he was seven and he was brought up by his mother. In primary school, he displayed a talent for drawing and mathematics. He was a hard-working student and later received his military education at the École Polytechnique and then at the École d'application de l'artillerie in Metz. From 1843 to 1847 he served in Algeria, then for one year in Guadeloupe, and again from 1849 to 1852 in Algeria.

== West Africa ==
In 1852 he was transferred to Senegal as sub-director of engineers, and in 1854 was promoted chef de bataillon and appointed governor of the colony on December 16. He held this post with one brief interval (1861–1863) until July 1865.

The work he accomplished in French West Africa constitutes his most enduring legacy. At that time France possessed in Senegal little else than the town of Saint-Louis and a strip of coast. Furthermore, its position there was precarious - in Saint-Louis for example the French were forced to pay tribute to the Moors. Explorers had, however, made known the riches and possibilities of the Niger regions, and Faidherbe formed the design of adding those countries to the French dominions. He even dreamed of creating a French African empire stretching from Senegal to the Red Sea.

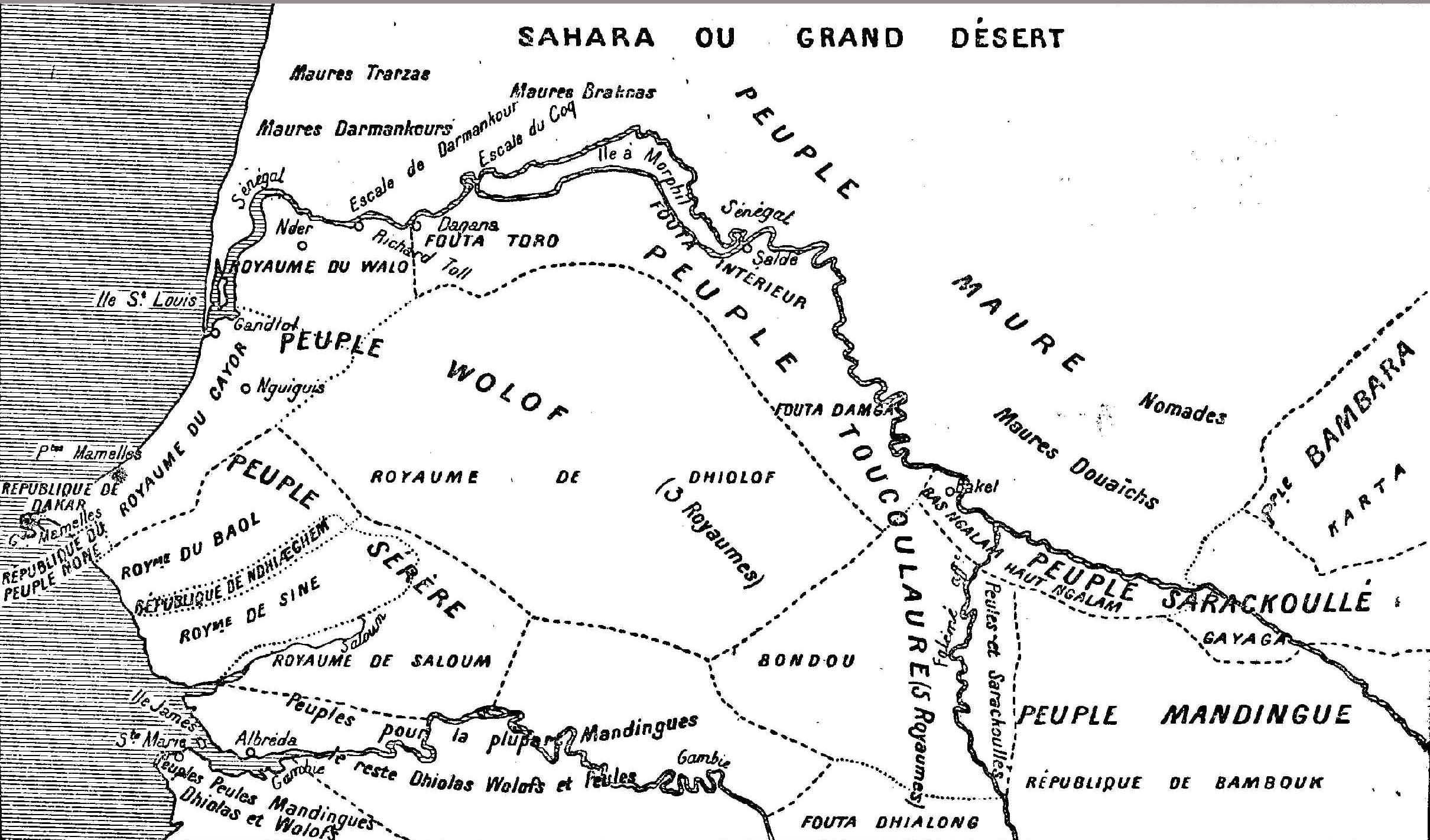
The Senegal River valley upon the arrival of Faidherbe (1853).

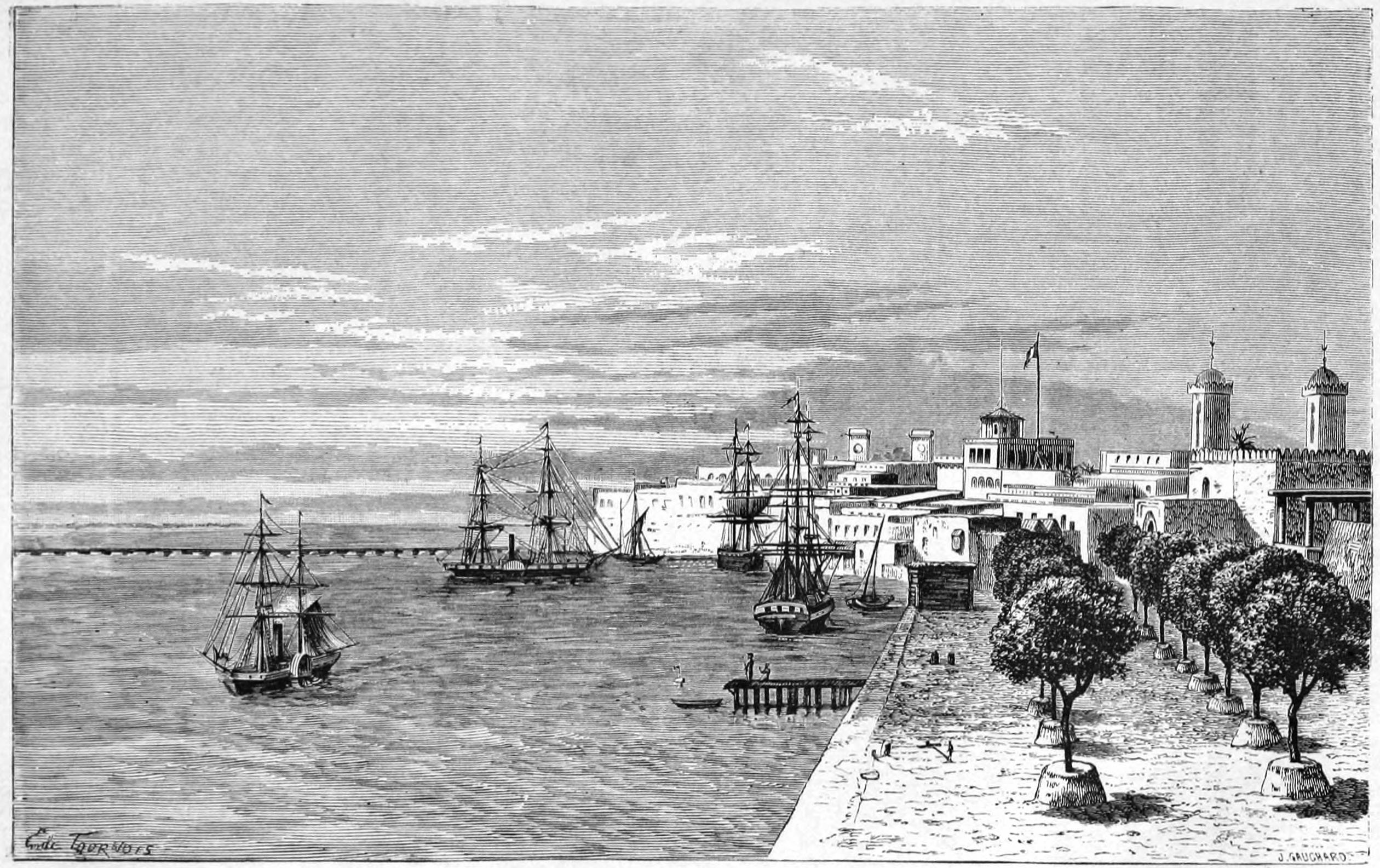
View of Saint-Louis in the 1860s

=== Direct control of the Senegal River ===
Faidherbe's actions were not of his own creation, but were an implementation of "The Plan of 1854": a series of ministerial orders given to Governor Protet that originated in petitions from the powerful Bordeaux-based Maurel and Prom company, the largest shipping interest in Saint-Louis. The plan specified in detail the creation of forts along the Sénégal River to end African control of the acacia gum trade from the interior. Faidherbe's push to build fortifications farther out, his conflicts with Protet, and his protests to Paris over Protet's inaction earned him the governorship in 1854.

Within three months of his appointment as governor, he had begun work on the first in a series on inland forts up the Sénégal, at Médine just below the Félou Falls (1855). By 1860, Faidherbe had built a series of forts between Médine and Saint-Louis, launching missions against the Trarza Moors in Waalo (north of the Sénégal river), who had previously collected taxes on goods coming to Saint-Louis from the interior.

=== Conflict in the interior ===
French military forces had previously avoided conflicts with the most powerful states in the area, the Peul empire along the Niger River, and the Cayor in the south. By sending emissaries to sign protectorates with weaker states (Bubakar Saada of Bundu, King Samba of Khasso) and by completing the "pacification" of Casamance and the Wolof peoples through what is now northern Senegal, Faidherbe quickly came into direct conflict with these states.

=== War with the Fulanis of Fouta Toro ===
To accomplish even the first part of his design, he had very inadequate resources, especially in view of the opposition from El Hadj Umar Tall, the Muslim ruler of the countries of the middle Niger. By advancing the French outposts on the upper Senegal, and particularly by breaking Umar Tall's siege of Medina Fort, Faidherbe stemmed the Muslim advance. Striking an advantageous treaty with Umar in 1860, Faidherbe brought the French possessions into touch with the Niger. He also brought into subjection the country lying between the Senegal River and Gambia.

=== War with the Serer people ===
At the Battle of Logandème (18 May 1859), Faidherbe launched war against the Serer people of Sine, during the reign of Maad a Sinig Kumba Ndoffene Famak Joof (King of Sine). After his victory, he gave the order for Fatick (one of the provinces of Sine) and its surrounding villages to be burned to the ground. The French government in Paris criticised him for undertaking a military campaign without their authority. To answer his critics, Faidherbe claimed that he only occupied areas that belonged to France since 1679. Scholars like Martin A. Klein note that Faidherbe was merely playing with words and was making political decisions in Senegal without any authority whatsoever. Neither the Kingdom of Sine nor any of its provinces had ever belonged to France.

=== Economics ===
Saint-Louis was placed under formal military control, and a telegraph and road link was set up to the other French colonies in Gorée Island and Rufisque. In 1857, the French seized the inland region between these two from the Lebu Republic, and rechristened their capital Ndakarou as the new colonial city of Dakar. Work was begun on the Dakar–Saint-Louis railway, as well as a rail line along the Senegal into the interior.

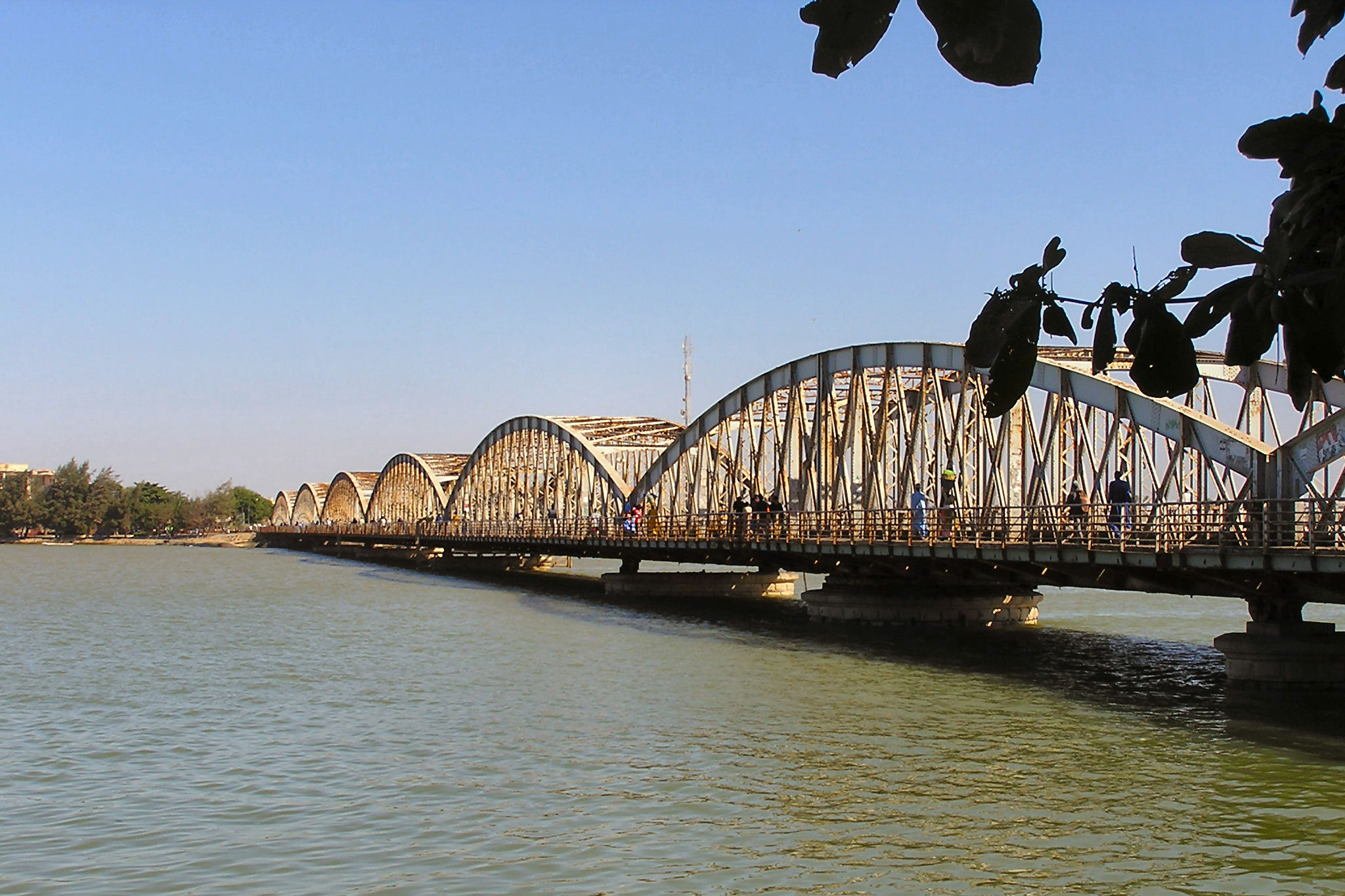
Faidherbe Bridge in Saint-Louis

Faidherbe's large-scale projects included the building of bridges and provisioning of fresh drinking water. But Saint-Louis's place as a door of French trade into an African interior began to wane with the expansion of direct colonial rule. Access to its port became increasingly awkward in the age of the steamship; and the completion of the Dakar-Saint Louis railroad in 1885 meant that up-country trade effectively circumvented its port. Large French firms, many from the city of Bordeaux, took over the new commercial networks of the interior, marginalizing the Métis traders who had always been the middle men of upstream commerce.

Faidherbe also placed under direct French control large-scale seasonal groundnut cultivation near the fort systems, and then along the rail lines. This created the navétanes system of seasonal labor migration, first in Cayor, then spreading along the rail lines to Baol and Sine-Saloum, and eventually along the Thies-Kayes railway. This would be a pattern spread throughout French West Africa and French Equatorial Africa well into the 20th century.

=== Legacy in French colonialism ===
When he resigned his post, French rule had been firmly established over a very considerable and fertile area and the foundation laid upon which his successors built up the position occupied after 1904 by France in West Africa.

The first half-century of French colonialism in Senegal produced neither solid political control nor economic gains. However, it established the basic principles for the later French advance. Senegal became the principal French base, not Guinea. French expansion was aimed towards the interior (which also encouraged expansion south in Algeria), and Faidherbe's vision of empire was confirmed.

In 1863 he became general of brigade. From 1867 to early 1870, he commanded the subdivision of Bona in Algeria, and was commanding the Constantine division at the commencement of the Franco-Prussian War.

== Marriage and family ==
Soon after his arrival in Saint-Louis Faidherbe took as a mistress, Diocounda Sidibe (Dionkhounda Siadibi), a fifteen-year-old Sarakolé girl. She helped him in his study of the Wolof, Pular, and Sarakolé languages. On 15 February 1857, they had a son, Louis Léon Faidherbe. In 1858, when Faidherbe was 40, he married his 18-year-old niece, Angèle-Emilie Marie Sophie Faidherbe. She was the daughter of his older brother, Romain, who had died eight years earlier. The marriage produced three children: Gaston, Mathilde and Wilhem. Angèle also helped care for Louis, the son of Sidibe.

Another of Faidherbe's nieces, his wife's older sister Clarence, married the naval officer Théophile Aube in May 1861. At the time Aube was serving in Senegal. He would later be promoted to admiral.

== Franco-Prussian War ==
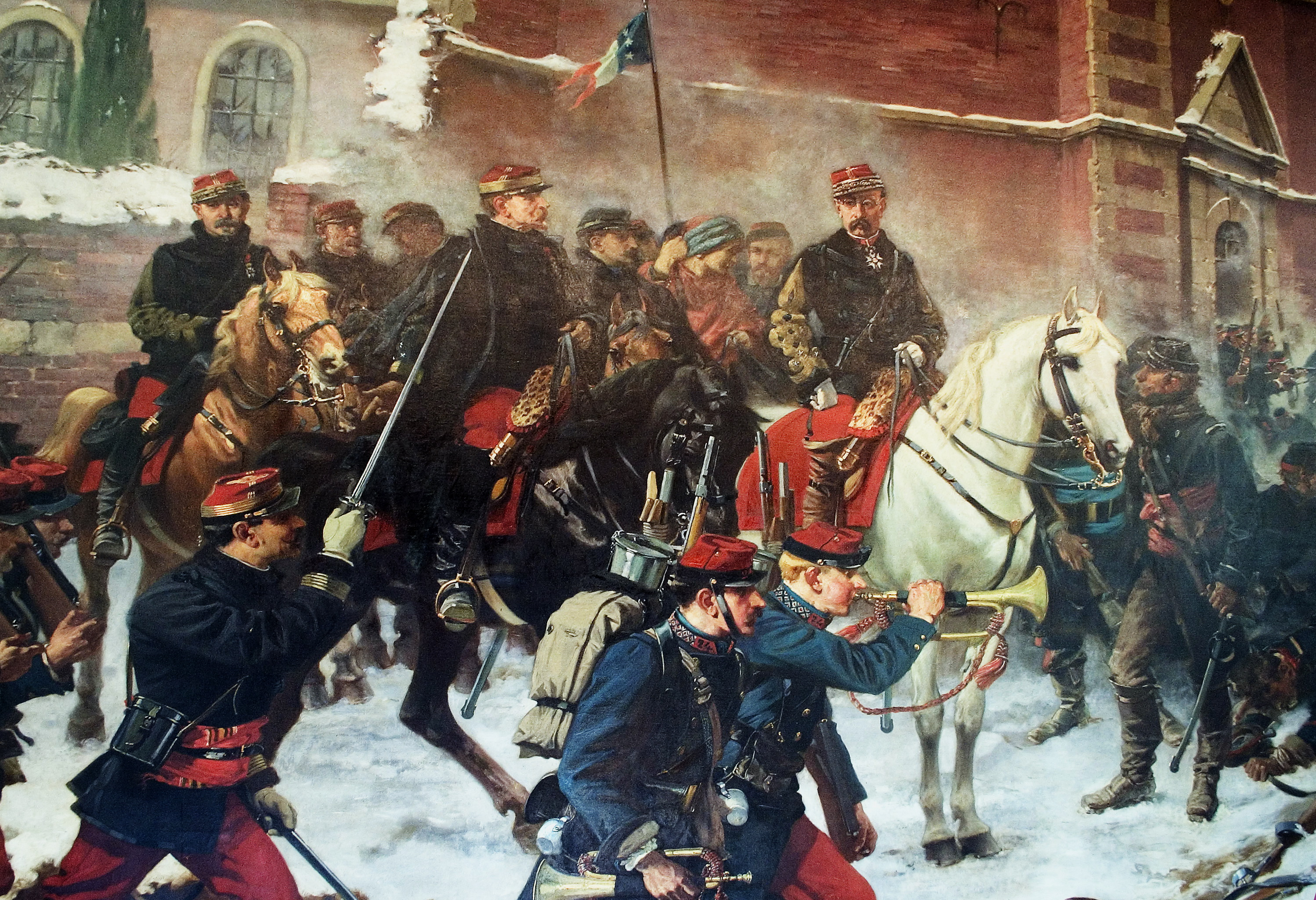
Painting by Charles Édouard Armand-Dumaresq showing Faidherbe at the Battle of Bapaume.

After the defeat of Napoleon III and his French Imperial Army by the Prussian Army in the summer of 1870, colonial officers such as Faidherbe were recalled to France and promoted to higher ranks to command new units and replace generals killed or captured in the war. Faidherbe was promoted to divisional general in November 1870, and in December appointed as commander-in-chief of the Army of the North by the Government of National Defence.

Faidherbe quickly proved himself to be the most able of the generals fighting Prussian forces in the French provinces, and won several small victories against the Prussian First Army at the towns of Ham, Hallue, and Pont-Noyelles. Despite his military skills, Faidherbe was never able to form an army strong enough to seriously worry the Prussians, as his army, composed of raw recruits, suffered immense supply difficulties and low morale in the freezing winter of 1870–1871. The Army of the North performed remarkably well by striking isolated enemy forces and then retreating behind the belt of fortresses around Pas-de-Calais. Ultimately, however, Faidherbe was ordered by Minister of War Leon Gambetta to attack the Prussians – Faidherbe rushed into an open battle at St Quentin and his army was destroyed.

== Political life and retirement ==
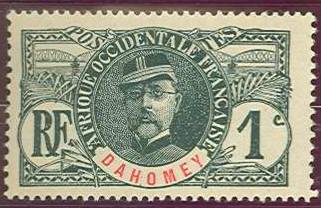
French stamp issued in 1906 honoring Faidherbe

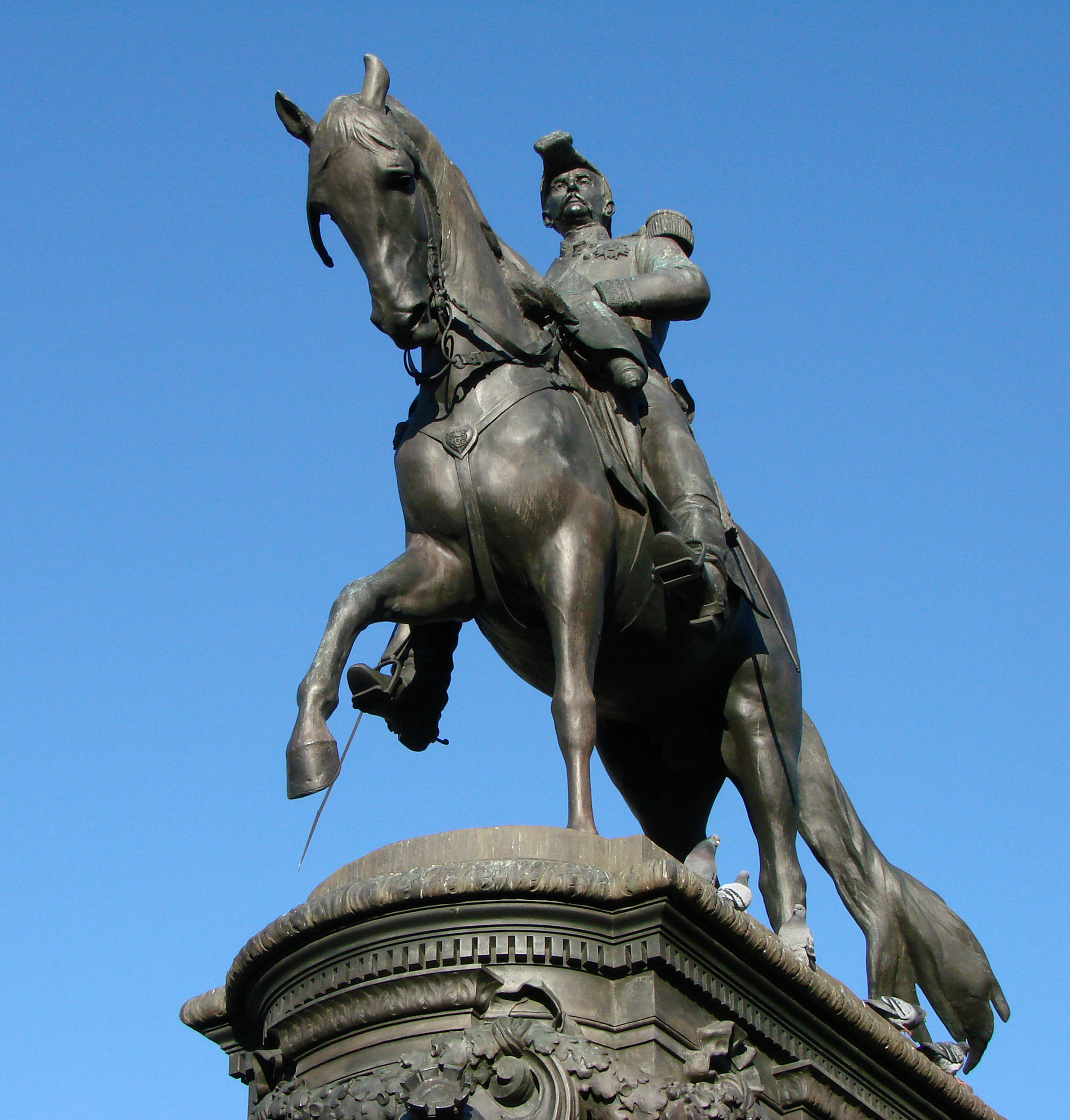
Equestrian statue of Faidherbe by Antonin Mercié in Lille

During the course of his military career Faidherbe was decorated with the five degrees of the Legion of Honor: the Chevalier in 1852, the Officier in 1855, the Commandeur in 1861, the Grand Officier in 1871 and the Grand Croix in 1880.

Faidherbe was named as candidate for the legislature on several lists in the Somme department in the elections of 8 February 1871, and was elected. He decided not to accept his election while retaining his military command in the north. After he resigned from the army he was reelected on 2 July 1871 as representative for the Somme, for Pas-de-Calais and for Nord. He chose to represent Nord. (Note: A by-election was held to replace him in Pas-de-Calais on 7 January 1872 in which the Bonapartist Charles Levert was elected.) However, he resigned on 26 August 1871 after voting against giving the Assembly the power to define a constitution, because he said the Assembly had given itself that right rather than receiving it from the electors. On 8 October 1871 he became a member of the departmental Council of Nord for the canton of Lille center.

Between October 1871 and May 1872 Faidherbe undertook a scientific mission to Upper Egypt, where he studied the monuments and inscriptions. On the same trip he visited Jerusalem and Italy. He ran for election to the senate in Nord as a republican on 30 January 1876 but was defeated. Faidherbe was elected on 5 January 1879 to the senate for the département of Nord. He resigned his seat prior to the end of his term in 1888.

An enthusiastic geographer, historian, philologist and archaeologist, he wrote numerous works, including Collection des inscriptions numidiques (1870), La Campagne de l'armée du Nord (1871), Epigraphie phenicienne (1873), Essai sur la langue poul (1875), and Le Zénaga des tribus sénégalaises (1877), the last a study of the Berber language. He also wrote on the geography and history of Senegal and the Sahara.

He was elected a senator in 1879, and, in spite of failing health, continued to the last a close student of his favorite subjects.

== Death ==
Faidherbe died on 29 September 1889, his body receiving a public funeral. Statues and monuments to his memory were erected at Lille, Bapaume, Saint-Quentin and Saint-Louis, Senegal. Numerous streets are named after him, and also the subway station in Paris (Faidherbe-Chaligny).

== Works ==
- Faidherbe, L. (1854). "Les Berbères et les Arabes des bords du Sénégal". Bulletin de la Société de Géographie (Paris). 4th series. 7: 89–112.
- ——— (1856). "Populations noires des bassins du Sénégal et du Haut Niger". Bulletin de la Société de Géographie (Paris). 4th series. 11: 281–300.
- ——— (1859). Notice sur la colonie du Sénégal et sur les pays qui sont en relation avec elle. Paris: A. Bertrand.
- ——— (1859). Vocabulaire d'environ 1,500 mots français les plus usuels avec leurs correspondants en ouolof de Saint-Louis, à l'usage des écoles indigènes. Saint-Louis, Senegal: Imprimerie du Gouvernement. OCLC 249063491.
- ——— (1863). "L'avenir du Sahara et du Soudan". Revue maritime et coloniale. 8: 221–248.
- ——— (1864). Vocabulaire d'environ 1,500 mots français avec leurs correspondants en ouslof de Saint-Louis, en poular, Toucoulor, du Fouta, en Soninké, Sarakhollé, de Bakel. Saint-Louis, Senegal: Imprimerie du Gouvernement. OCLC 559326045.
- ——— (1864). Chapitre de géographie sur le Nord-Ouest de l'Afrique à l'usage des écoles de Sénégambie. Saint-Louis, Senegal: Imprimerie du gouvernement. OCLC 82569267.
- ——— (1865). "Étude sur la langue Kéguem ou Sérè-Sine". Annuaire de Sénegal et dépendances. Saint-Louis, Sénegal: Imprimerie du Gouvernement: 173–245.
- ——— (1866). "Résumé historique et géographique du voyage de MM. Mage et Quintin à Ségou". Annales des voyages, de la géographie, de l'histoire et de l'archéologie. 4: 223–270.
- ——— (1870). "Collection complète des inscriptions numidiques (libyques), avec des aperçus ethnographiques sur les numides". Mémoires de la Société des sciences, de l'agriculture et des arts de Lille. 3rd Series. 8: 361–425.
- ——— (1871). Campagne de l'armée du Nord en 1870-1871, avec une carte, des notes et des pièces justificatives. Paris: E. Dentu.
- ——— (1872). "Épigraphie phénicienne". Mémoires de la Société des sciences, de l'agriculture et des arts de Lille. 3rd Series. 10: 293–299.
- ——— (1873). Armée du nord. Réponse à la relation du général Von Goeben pour faire suite à la "Campagne de l'armée du nord". Paris: E.Dentu.
- ——— (1875). Essai sur la langue poul, grammaire et vocabulaire. Paris: Maisonneuve.
- ——— (1877). Le Zénaga des tribus sénégalaises: contribution à l'étude de la langue berbère. Paris: E. Leroux.
- ———; Quintin, L. (1881). "Dictionnaire de la langue poul, par le général Faidherbe, augmenté par le Docteur Quintin". Bulletin de la Société de géographie. 7th Series. 2: 334–354.
- ——— (1882). Grammaire et vocabulaire de la langue poul : à l'usage des voyageurs dans le Soudan. Paris: Maisonneuve.
- ——— (1887). Langues sénégalaises : wolof, arabe-hassania, soninké, sérère, notions grammaticales, vocabulaires et phrases. Paris: E. Leroux. OCLC 6967898.
- ——— (1889). Le Sénégal: la France dans l'Afrique occidentale. Paris: Hachette.

== Sources ==
- This article incorporates text from a publication now in the public domain: Chisholm, Hugh, ed. (1911). "Faidherbe, Louis Léon César". Encyclopædia Britannica. Vol. 10 (11th ed.). Cambridge University Press. p. 126.
- Barrows, Leland C. (1976). "Faidherbe and Senegal: a critical discussion". African Studies Review. 19 (1): 95–117. doi:10.2307/523854. JSTOR 523854. S2CID 143877276.
- Coursier, Alain (1989). Faidherbe, 1818–1889: du Sénégal à l'Armée du Nord (in French). Paris: Tallandier. ISBN 978-2-235-01888-3.
- Kanya-Forstner, A.S. (1969). The Conquest of the Western Sudan: A Study in French Military Imperialism. Cambridge: Cambridge University Press. ISBN 978-0-521-10372-5.
- Robert, Adolphe; Cougny, Gaston (1890). "Faidherbe (Louis-Léon-César)". Dictionnaire des Parlementaires français (1789–1889) (in French). Vol. 2: CAY-FES. Paris: Edgar Bourloton. pp. 590–592.
- Robert, Adolphe; Bourloton, Edgar; Cougny, Gaston (1891). "Levert (Charles Alphonse)". Dictionnaire des Parlementaires français (1789–1889) (in French). Vol. 3: LAV-PLA. Paris: Edgar Bourloton. pp. 147–148.
- Saint-Martin, Yves-Jean (1989). Le Sénégal sous le second Empire: Naissance d'un empire colonial (1850–1871) (in French). Paris: Karthala. ISBN 2-86537-201-4.
