= Émile Pinet-Laprade =

Émile Pinet-Laprade (1822–1869) was a French governor of Senegal.

== Biography ==
Succeeding Bernard Jauréguiberry, Pinet-Laprade was governor of Senegal from May 13, 1863, until July 14, 1863. Louis Faidherbe then took over until May 1, 1865, when Pinet-Laprade assumed the position again until July 14, 1863. Ferdinand Charles Alexandre Tredos then succeeded him. Pinet-Laprade was born on July 13, 1822, in Mirepoix, Ariège and died on August 17, 1869, in Saint-Louis, Senegal. He was buried in Mirepoix on August 11, 1872.

== Posterity ==
A major boulevard in Dakar bears his name. He had no children.
