= Junjung =

War drum of the Serer ethnic group

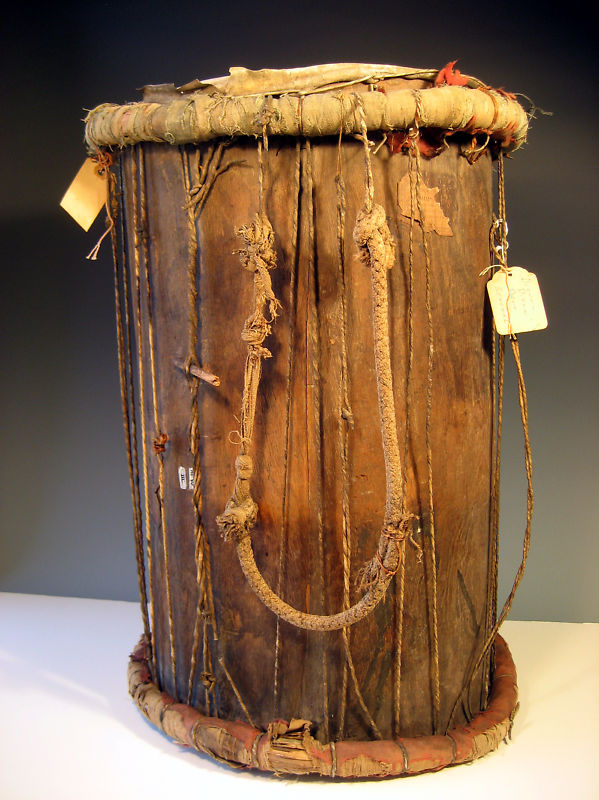
19th century junjung, from the Kingdom of Sine, part of present-day Senegal.

A junjung (or variously jung-jung, gungun, dyoung-dyoung etc.) is the royal war drum of the Serer people in Senegal and the Gambia. It was played on the way to the battlefield, on special state occasions as well as on Serer religious ceremonies.

It is also the progenitor of the music of the same name found in the Caribbean.

== See also ==
- Dunun
