= Kopé Tiatie Cac =

Senegalese deity

Kopé Tiatie Cac (also Koh and Koope; in Ndut language, meaning god grandfather or god the grandfather) is the Supreme Creator of the Ndut. Kopé Tiatie Cac is the name used by the Ndut people to refer to the Supreme being. Among the Ndut and followers of Serer religion, Kopé Tiatie Cac is associated with death and plague (pisti).

== Ndut cosmogony ==
The Ndut people who adhere to the tenets of Serer religion refer to the supreme god as Kopé Tiatie Cac in Cangin-Ndut. The name Kopé Tiatie Cac probably derived from the god Koox (var : Kooh). Ndut cosmogony posits that, the first humans did not die. The human species were not meant to die following the initial creation. The dog was the first to die at that primordial time. Having witnessed the death of the animal, the Ndut people gave the animal a sacred burial at the foot of a baobab tree, and mourned its death. The women crying and wailing in sadness for the departed dog, attracted the attention of Kopé Tiatie Cac (or Koh) God of death. The god angered by the mourning women unleashed death to human kind in the following terms:

What! You make so much noise for a dead dog? Good! You die you too.

== Worship ==
The deity is worshiped through Serer ancestral spirits and saints. Various matrilineages (both on the paternal and maternal line) play a key role in its invocation. The name koh a variant of the god's' name, is the feminine form. The masculine form is ala.

== See also ==
The people

- Serer people
  - Saafi people
  - Palor people
  - Ndut people
  - Laalaa people
  - Serer-Noon
  - Niominka people

Languages

- Cangin languages
  - Saafi language
  - Palor language
  - Ndut language
  - Lehar language
  - Noon language
- Serer language

Serer religious articles

- Serer religion
- Roog (Serer deity)
- Koox
- Serer creation myth
- Lamane
- States headed by ancient Serer Lamanes
- Saltigue
- Ndut initiation rite
- Timeline of Serer history

Related articles

- Faro (mythology)
- Nommo
- Traditional African religion
- List of African deities

== Bibliography ==
- Dupire, Marguerite, "Sagesse sereer: Essais sur la pensée sereer ndut", KARTHALA Editions, (1994), pp 61–86, ISBN 2865374874
- Ndiaye, Ousmane Sémou, "Diversité et unicité sérères : l’exemple de la région de Thiès", Éthiopiques, no. 54, vol. 7, 2e semestre 1991
- Éthiopiques, "Issues 55-56", Fondation Léopold Sédar Senghor, (1991), p 124
- Echenberg, Myron J., "Black death, white medicine: bubonic plague and the politics of public health in colonial Senegal, 1914-1945", Heinemann (2002), pp 139, 160-161, ISBN 0325070172
- Dupire, Marguerite, "Totems sereer et contrôle rituel de l'environnement", p 39 (in French)
