= Kokh Kox =

Deity of the Noon people of Senegal

Kokh Kox (or Koh, as pronounced in Noon) is the creator god of the Noon people. The Noon are members of the Serer ethnic group of Senegal, the Gambia and Mauritania. Kokh Kox is one of the main deities in Serer religion. The Noon people refer to the supreme being as Kokh Kox rather than Roog, the name the majority of Serers refer to the supreme being in the Serer-Sine language. The name Kokh Kox derives from the deity Koox, the name the Saafi people regularly use to refer to the divine.

== Noon Cosmogony ==
The Noon cosmogony follows a similar narrative to the Ndut especially in regards to how death began on Earth. In both myths, the dog is believed to have been the first living thing to have died.

== Worship ==
Kokh Kox is worshipped through intermediaries (e.g. the Pangool). Like all the Serer group who adhere to the tenets of Serer religion, the sacred wood plays a crucial role in the religious affairs of the Noon. The Serer-Noon sometimes refer to Kokh Kox affectionately as Tyagaye (grandfather). In times of great sorrow, the Noon people will evoke the name of Kokh Kox using the general Serer word Seen (variants : Sen, Sain, Sene, etc.), which is also a Serer surname. Depending on the Serer sub-group, the deity's name will precede the word Seen e.g. "Koh Seen" (or Koh Sen) used by the Noon in reference to Kokh Kox, or "Roog Seen" used by the non-Cangin-Serers in reference to Roog Seen, the name for the divine among the Serer-Sine. It is from this Serer religious heritage that the Wolof people (now islamized) borrowed the phrase "N'Daye San" from, also used exactly in that manner (i.e. to express great sorrow). The phrase is rooted in Serer religion and culture, and has nothing to do with Islam.

== Bibliography ==
- Tastevin, C. (R.P.), "La religion des Nones", Études missionnaires, t. II, no 2, avril-juin : 81–100; t. II, no 3, juillet-sep : 176–187. (1933, 1934)
- Dupire, Marguerite, "Sagesse sereer: Essais sur la pensée sereer ndut", KARTHALA Editions, (1994), pp 85–86, ISBN 2865374874
- Ndiaye, Ousmane Sémou, "Diversité et unicité sérères : l’exemple de la région de Thiès", Éthiopiques, no. 54, vol. 7, 2e semestre 1991
- Éthiopiques, "Issues 55-56", Fondation Léopold Sédar Senghor, (1991), p 124
- "Religion en Afrique, Volumes 15-17", E.J. Brill (1985), pp 203–5
- Deffontaines, Pierre, "Géographie et religiones", Edition 10, Gallimard (1948), pp 54–71, 369
- Société de géographie (France), "La Géographie, Volumes 61-62", Masson et cie., (1934), p 245
- Faye, Louis Diène, "Mort et Naissance le monde Sereer", Les Nouvelles Editions Africaines (1983), ISBN 2-7236-0868-9
