= Serer-Noon =

Ethnic people from western Senegal

Serer Kings
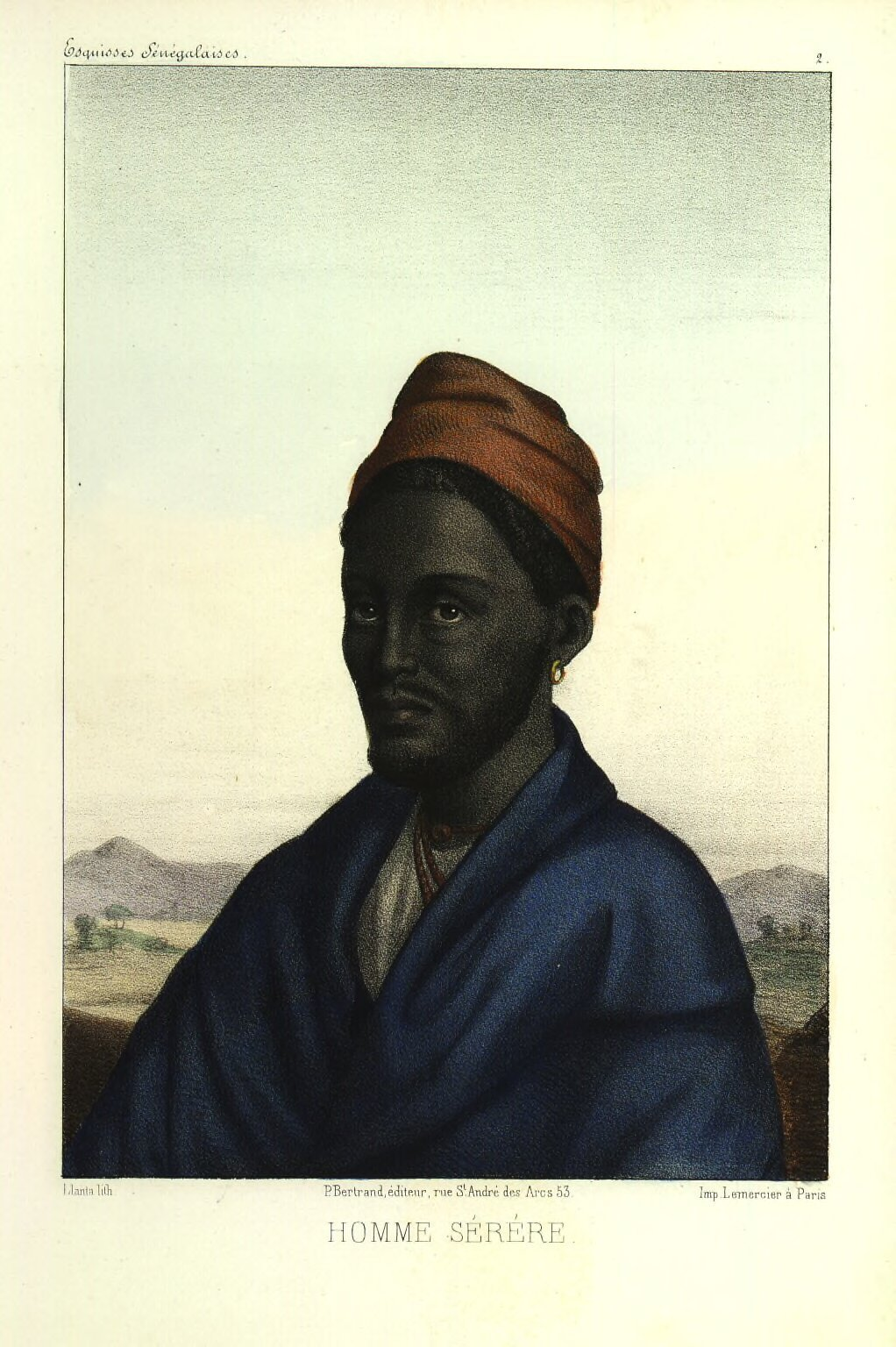
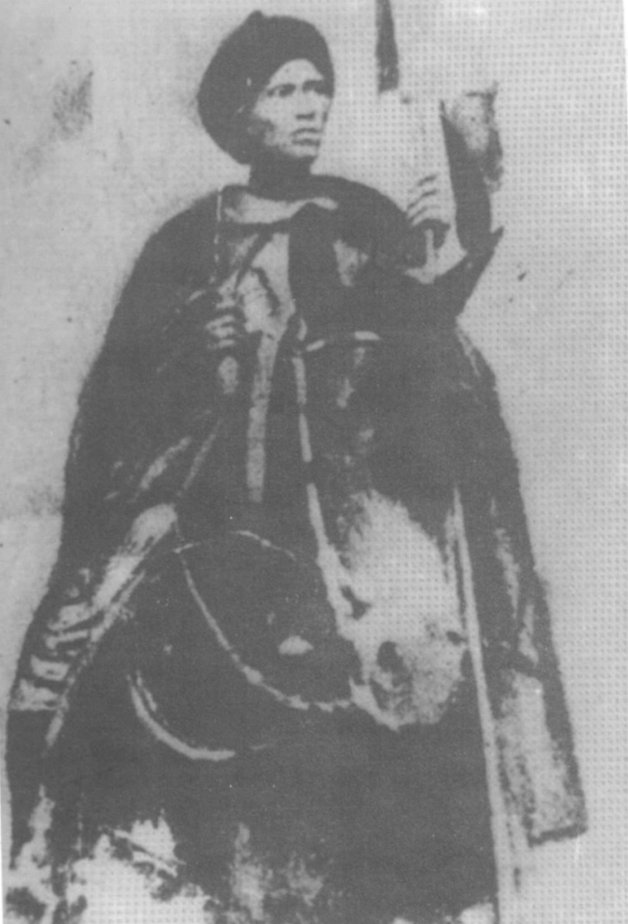
Serer kings of Sine (from left to right): Maad a Sinig Ama Joof Gnilane Faye Joof and Maad a Sinig Kumba Ndoffene Fa Ndeb Joof.

The Serer-Noon also called Noon (sometimes spelt Non or None) are an ethnic people who occupy western Senegal. They are part of the Serer people though they do not speak the Serer-Sine language natively.

== Territory ==
They are found primarily in Senegal in the region of Thiès in areas like Fandène, Peykouk, Silman, Diankhène and Dioung. As well as being present in Senegal, they are also found in the Gambia.

== Population ==
In the Thies area alone, their population is 32,900. Collectively, the Serer people make-up the third largest ethnic group in Senegal.

== History ==
In his Sketches of Senegal (1853), Abbé Boilat described them as "the most beautiful black people... tall and beautiful posture... who are always well dressed, very strong and independent" During the 19th century muslim marabout jihads in Senegambia, the Serer-Noon resisted being islamized and continued to practice their beliefs to present. In the 1860s, Pinet Laprade, then the French governor of Senegal, and Captain Vincent described the Serer-Noon men as "fierce and cruel to foreigners" (the French). They only traded with other Serers through barter and resented the authority of foreigners. Of all the Senegambian ethnic groups, the Noons were among the most independent during the colonial period. The Noons also refused to pay taxes to the French administration of Senegal in the 19th century and launched many wars and massacres against the French. To force the Serer-Noon to pay tax to the French administration in Senegal, sometimes violence was used against them. In Noon country, their heads of state were the Lamanes. The Lamanes managed the Noon towns and villages, and each village was an independent republic. The Lamanes in Noon country were the oldest men chosen from particular families. Although these Lamanes should not be confused with the ancient Serer Lamanes (the old powerful kings and landed gentry), the Lamanes in Noon country were very powerful during the colonial period.

== Culture ==
The Serer-Noon are mostly farmers who grow millet, peanuts, cotton etc. They tend to follow monogamy. Like many of the Serer group, the Noons rarely marry out, and practice endogamy. They usually marry among themselves or other groups of the Serer race, but rarely outside the Serer group. Noon culture forbids mix-marriages. Where a young Serer-Noon has left his or her village for more than three months, on their return, they were subjected to prove their sexual purity. The head griot would offer them a beverage that they must drink. If vomit after drinking it, they were found guilty and sentence to celibacy. This test was just one of many tests carried out by the head griot. The head male griot would test the young man whilst the head female griot would test the young woman.

=== Language ===
They speak the Noon language, which is one of the Cangin languages rather than a dialect of the Serer-Sine language. Their language is closely related to Saafi and the Laalaa language.

== Religion ==
Like many of the Serer group to which they belong, the Noon were very resistant to Islamization, and still adhere to the tenets of Serer religion. The Serer religion involves cosmology, making offerings to Serer ancestral spirits and saints (i.e. the Pangool). The Noon refer to the supreme being as Kokh Kox (probably derived from the deity Kooh).

== See also ==
=== Related peoples ===
- Serer people
- Serer-Ndut people
- Saafi people
- Niominka people
- Serer-Laalaa
- Palor people

== Bibliography ==
- (in French) Issa Laye Thiaw. La Religiosite de Seereer, Avant et pendant leur Islamisation. Ethiopiques no: 54, Revue semestrielle de Culture Négro-Africaine. Nouvelle série, volume 7, 2e Semestre 1991
- (in French) Henry Gravrand. "La Civilisation Sereer" - Pangool, vol. 2. Les Nouvelles Editions Africaines du Senegal (1990), ISBN 2-7236-1055-1
- (in French) Gravrand, Henry, "Le Symbolisme sereer : Mythe du Saas et symboles", « Revue de Psycho-Pathologie » vol. 9 N^{o} 2 Dakar (1971) (Published and reviewed under the title "Le symbolisme serer" [in] Psychopath. Afric. 1973, IX, 2, 237-265 [in] Psychopathologie africaine) - (Link retrieved : 21 July 2012)
- (in French) Ndiaye, Ousmane Sémou, "Diversité et unicité Sérères: L'Exemple Le de la Région de Thiès", [in] Ethiopiques n°54, revue semestrielle, de culture négro-africaine, Nouvelle série volume 7., 2e semestre (1991) [2] (French)
- Senegambian Ethnic Groups: Common Origins and Cultural Affinities Factors and Forces of National Unity, Peace and Stability. By Alhaji Ebou Momar Taal. 2010
- Gambian Studies No. 17. “People of the Gambia. I. The Wolof with notes on the Serer and Lebou.” By David P. Gamble & Linda K. Salmon with Alhaji Hassan Njie. San Francisco 1985
- Elisa Daggs. All Africa: All its political entities of independent or other status. Hasting House, 1970. ISBN 0-8038-0336-2,

=== External reading ===
- (in French) Ferdinand de Lanoye, « Voyages et expéditions au Sénégal et dans les contrées voisines », in Le Tour du monde, vol. 3, 1861, 1er semestre, p. 35
- (in French) C. Becker, « La représentation des Sereer du nord-ouest dans les sources européennes (XV^{e}-XIX^{e} siècle) » in Journal des africanistes, 1985, tome 55 fascicule 1–2, p. 165-185
- (in French) Ousmane Sémou Ndiaye, « Diversité et unicité sérères : l'exemple de la région de Thiès », in Éthiopiques, n° 54, nouvelle série, volume 7, 2e semestre 1991
