= Ethnic groups in Senegal =

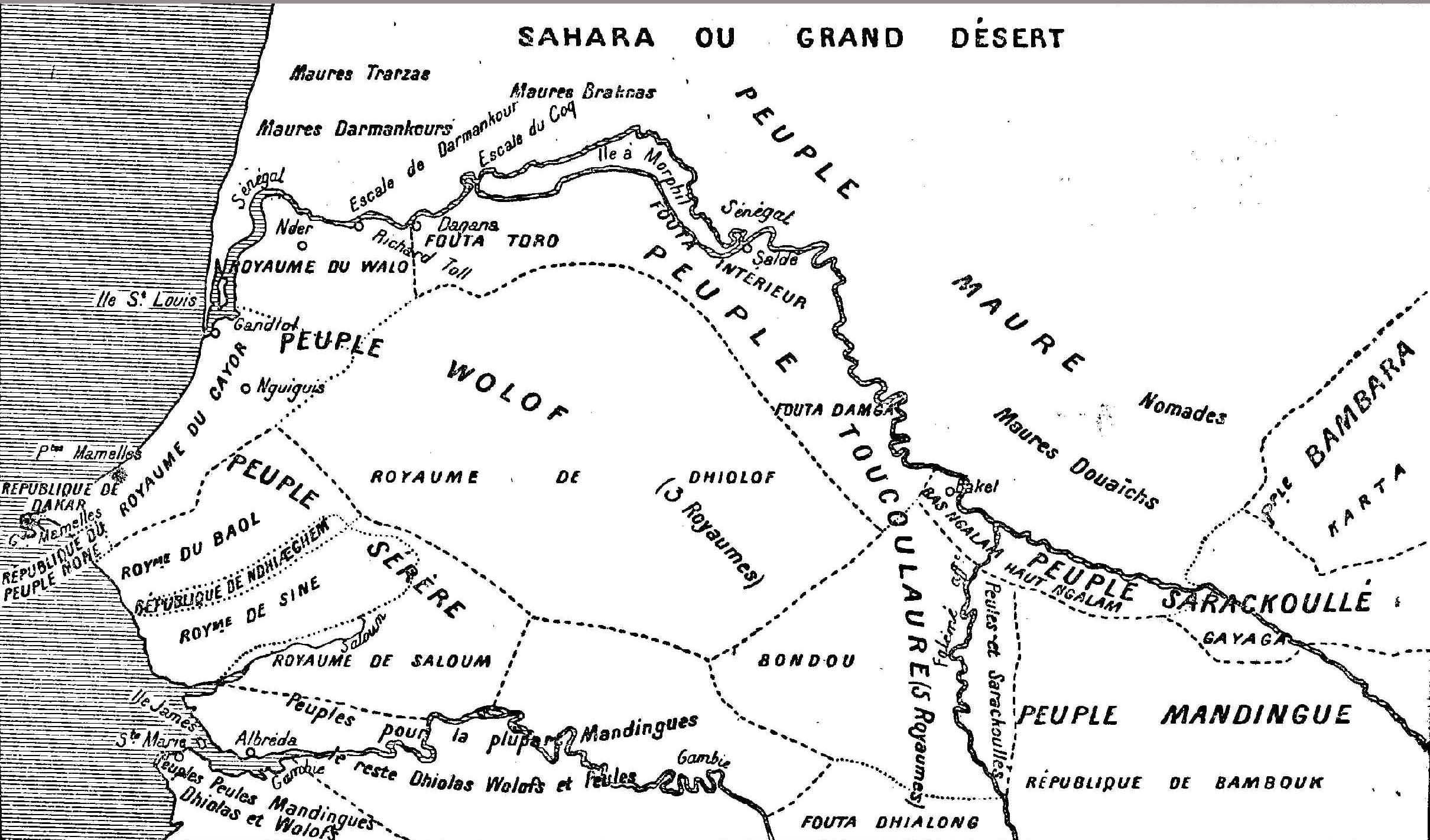
Map of the ethnic groups of Senegal drawn by David Boilat (1853)

There are various ethnic groups in Senegal. According to "CIA World Factbook: Senegal" (2019 estimates), the ethnic groups are Wolof (39%); Fula (probably including the Halpulaar speaking Toucouleur) (27.5%)); Serer group (probably including the Serer Cangin peoples (16%)); Mandinka (4.9%); Jola (4.2%); Soninke (2.4%); other 5.4% (includes Europeans and persons of Lebanese descent), and other minor ethnic groups like the Bassari, Maures or (Naarkajors)). Many subgroups of those can be further distinguished, based on religion, location and language. According to one 2005 estimate, there are at least twenty distinguishable groups of largely varying size.

== Major groups ==
Serer Kings
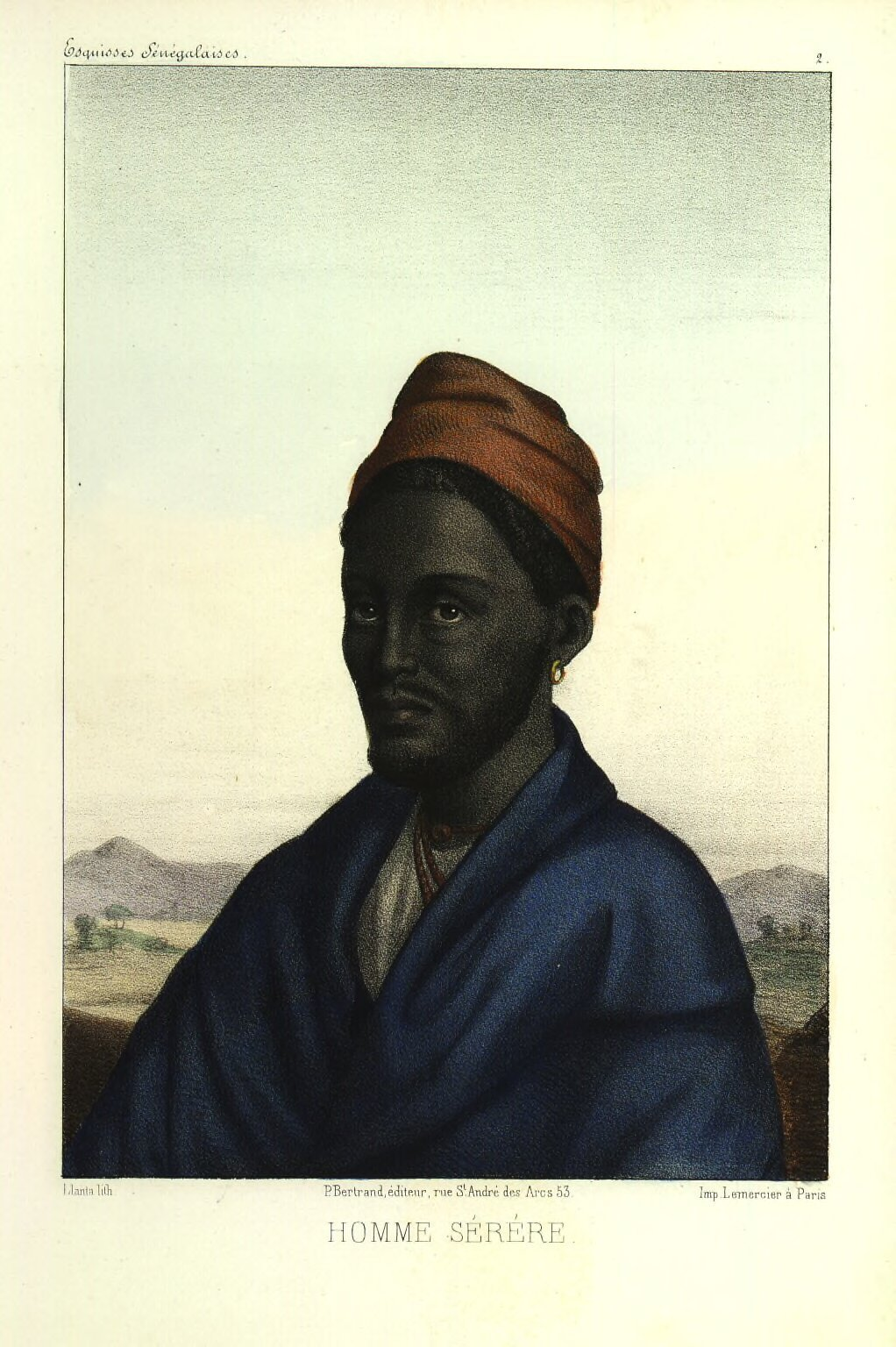
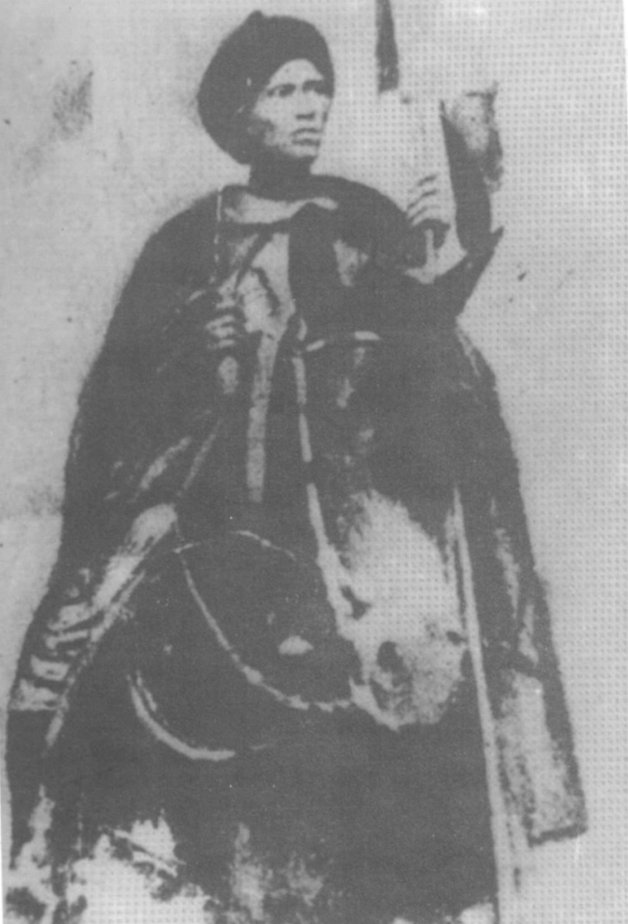
Left to right : Maad a Sinig Ama Joof Gnilane Faye Joof and Maad a Sinig Kumba Ndoffene Fa Ndeb Joof

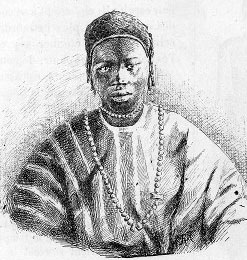
Wolof of Cayor (1890 engraving)

- The largest group is the Wolof, representing 39% of the population of the country. They live predominantly in the west, having descended from the kingdoms of Cayor, Waalo and Jolof that once existed in that area. Their population is focused in large urban centres. Most are Muslim, being either Mouride or Tijānī. The Lebou people of Cap-Vert and Petite Côte are considered a subgroup of the Wolof. however they represent less than 1% of its population. The prevalence of the Wolof both linguistically and politically has continued to increase throughout the years; this tendency has been called the "wolofisation" of Senegal.
- The Fula, those who speak the Fula language, are the second most populous group, representing 27.5% of the country's population. This figure includes the Toucouleurs, but according to surveys, this subgroup is sometimes considered separate from the Fula. They were Islamized very early. The territory inhabited by the Fula is larger than that of the Wolof, however many areas are sparsely populated, such as Ferlo, Kolda, the Senegal River Valley, and Badiar. Traditionally nomadic, the vast majority has become sedentary, although there is a current rural exodus. Since Ahmed Sékou Touré became president of Guinea, many Guinean Fula have immigrated to Senegal, particularly from Fouta Djallon.
- The third group is the Serer, who represent 16% of the national population. Serer pre-colonial kingdoms included : the Kingdom of Sine, Kingdom of Saloum, Biffeche and previously the Kingdom of Baol (ruled by the Joof family). Serer medieval history is characterized by resisting Islamization from the 11th century (during the Almoravids' advance) to the 19th century (the Marabout wars of Senegambia), resulting in the Battle of Fandane-Thiouthioune, commonly known as the Battle of Somb. The Serer anti-French movement during the colonial era resulted in the Battle of Logandème. The Serer people includes, but not limited to : the Saafi, Ndut, Laalaa, Niominka, Palor, etc. Many of these speak the Cangin languages. The Serer have been historically persecuted by the Muslims for their resistance of Islamization for almost a thousand years in order to preserve their religious beliefs and way of life. Since the 20th century, their religious and ethnic persecution is less visible. However, they are now viewed as the object of scorn and prejudice.

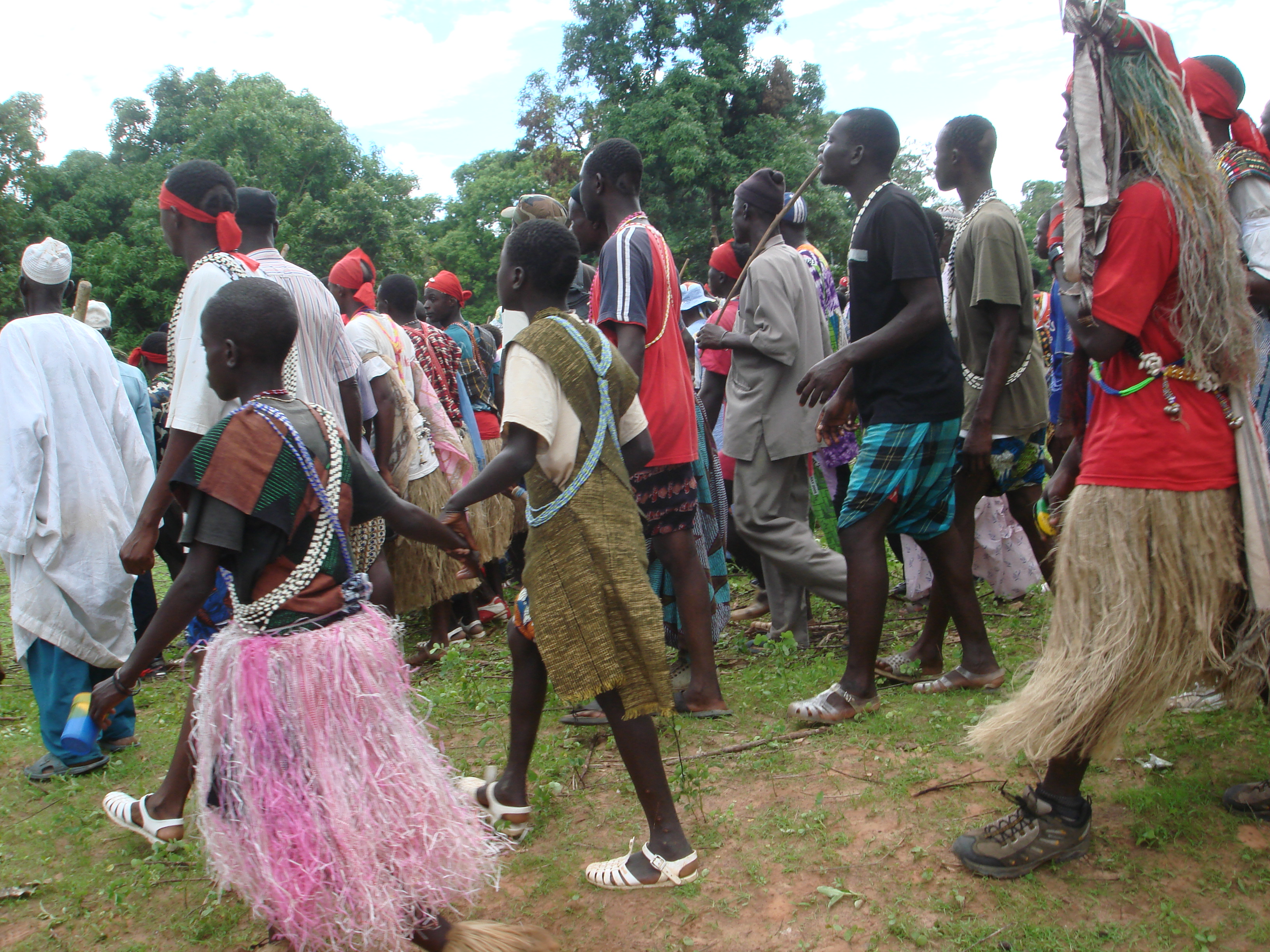
On the way to a boukout in Baïla in Jola country

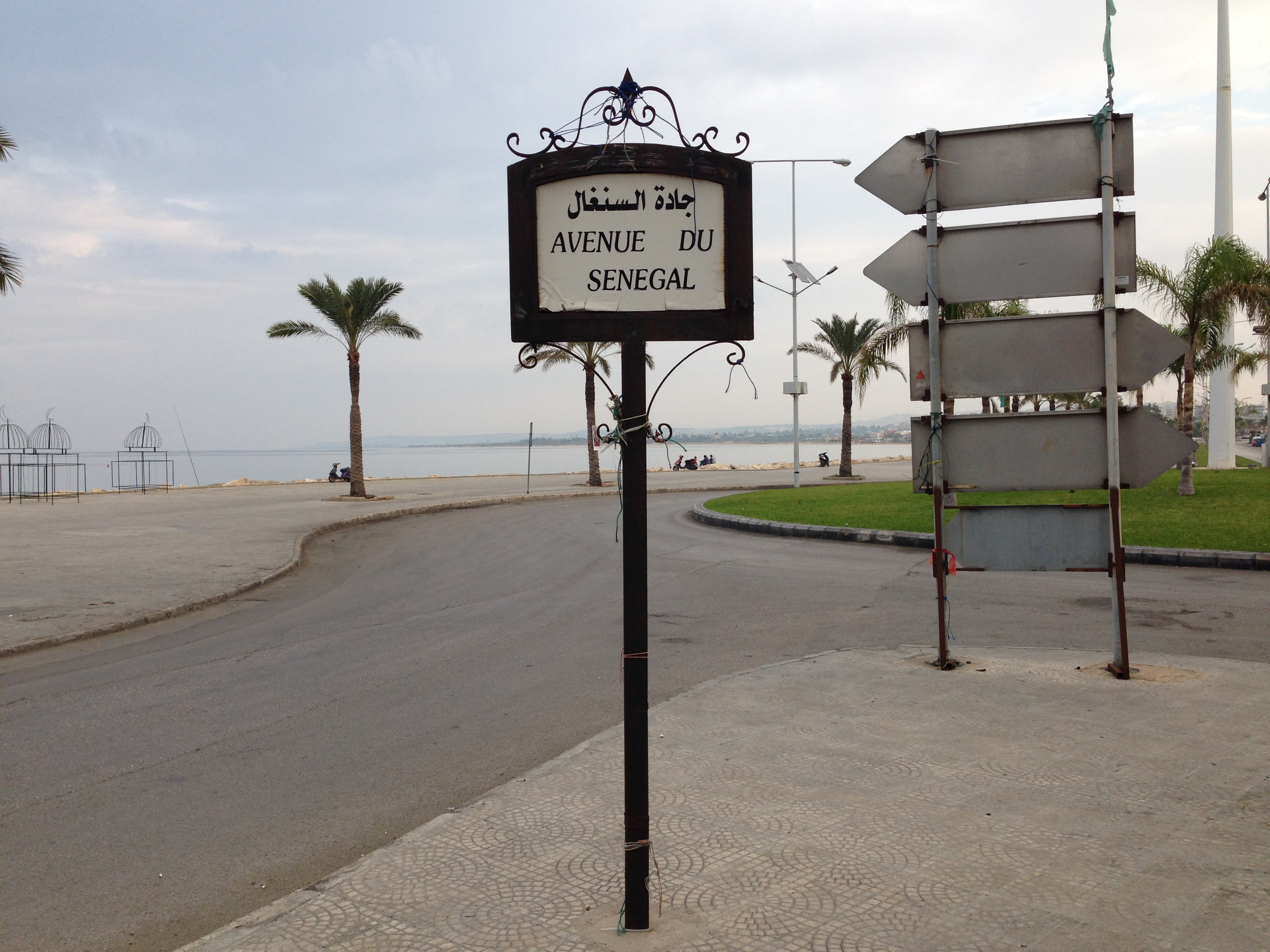
- Avenue du Senegal in Tyre, Lebanon
  The Jola represent 4.2% of the country's population, and mostly live in Ziguinchor where they primarily make their living from rice cultivation and fishing. Traditionally animist, they have historically resisted the spread of both Islam and Christianity in the country. While much of the Jola population now adheres to either Islam or Christianity, many mix these religions with animist beliefs. The Jola hold their ethnic distinctiveness as of great importance.
- Other groups also live in the Ziguinchor Region. While these groups lead lifestyles that are very similar to the Jola, they speak different languages and are much less populous. This is the case of the Bainuk, the Balanta, the Manjack, the Mankanya, the Karoninka, and the Bandial.
- Several small ethnic groups in Senegal are related to the Mandinka, together constituting 4.9% of the population of the country. These include the Malinké, the Sossé, the Bambara, the Dyula, the Yalunka, and the Jakhanke.
- The Soninke represent 2.4% of the population of Senegal. While most of the Soninke live in Mali, some live on the other side of the border, along the Falémé and Sénégal Rivers. This group has been experiencing a significant diaspora. The Soninke were Islamized earlier than most other groups in the country.

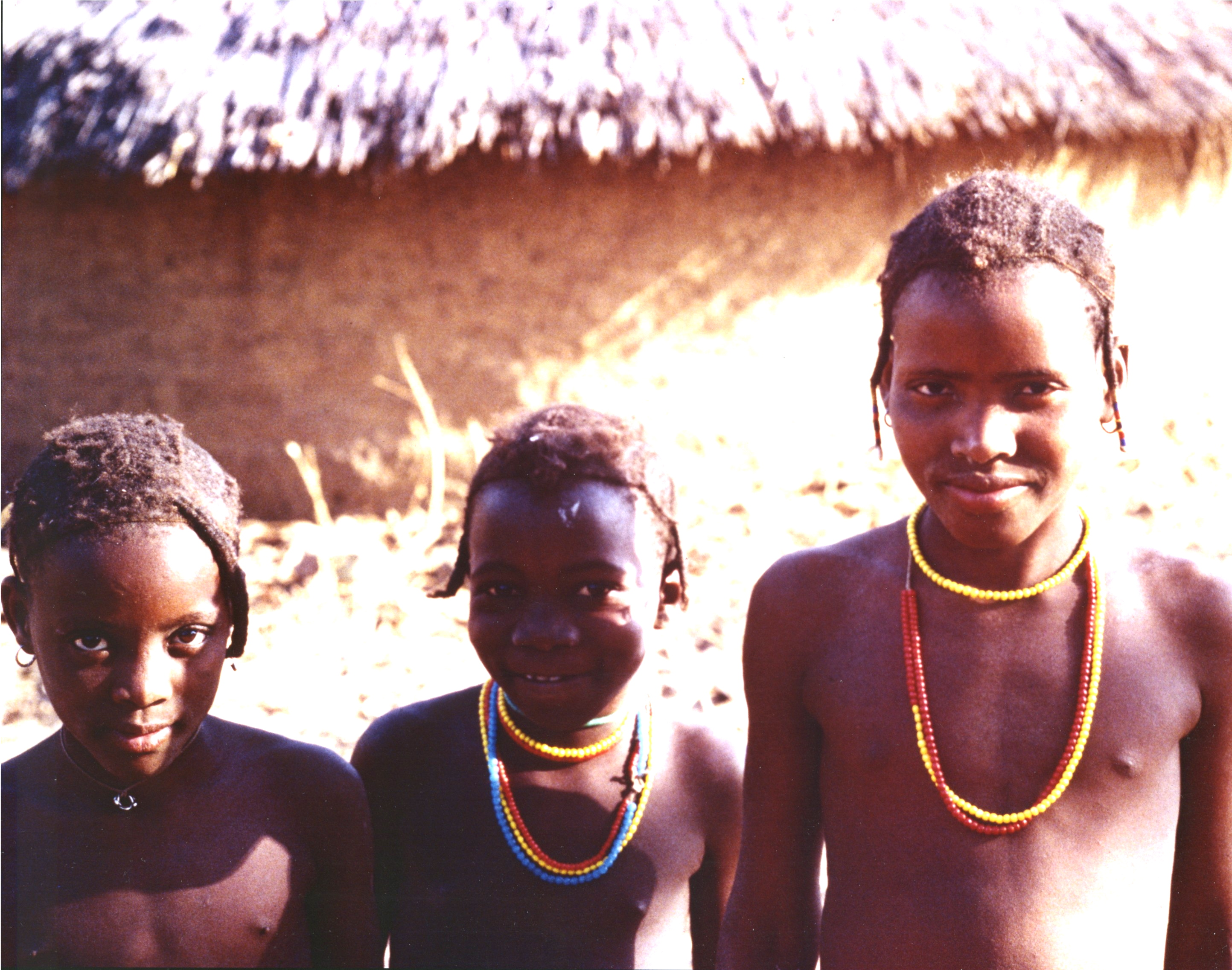
Bedick girls in Iwol

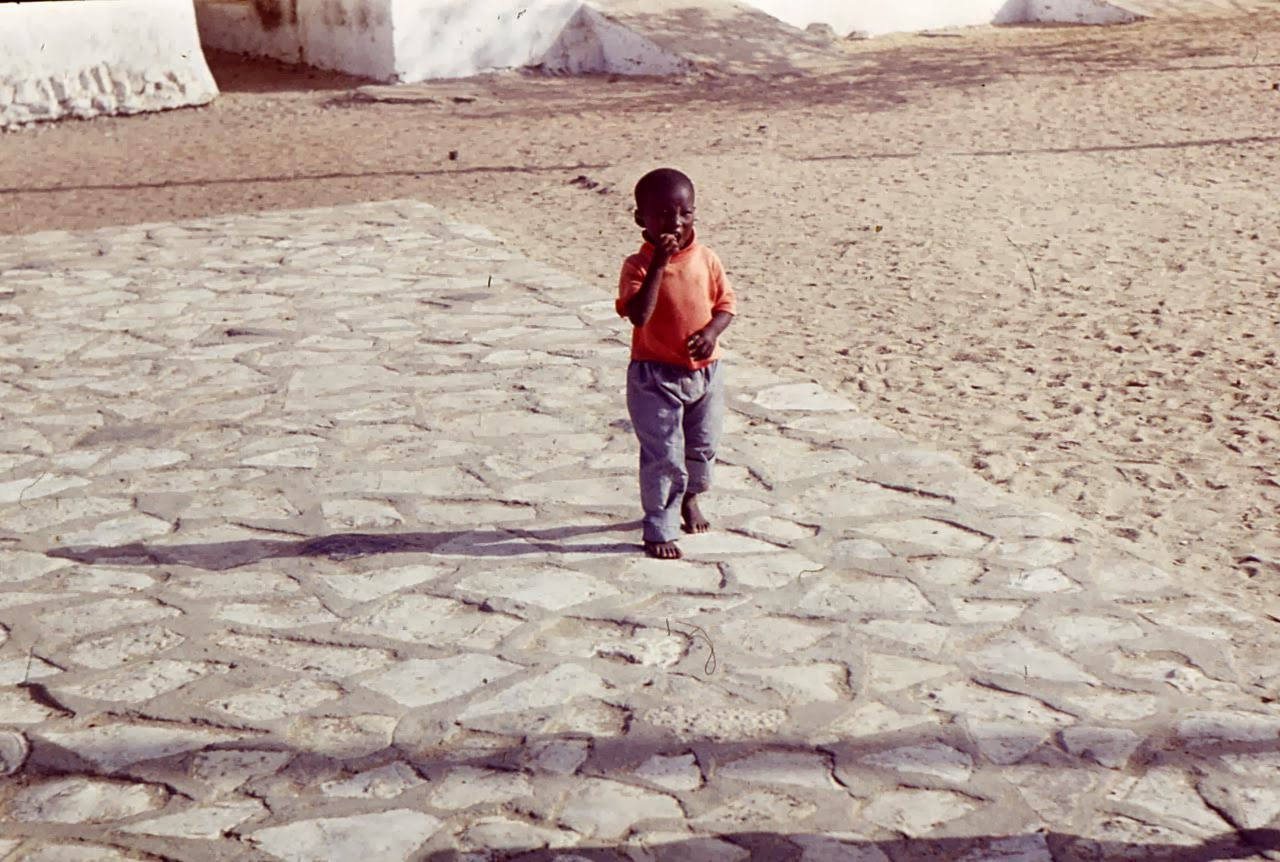
Senegalese boy on Gorée Island

A few Bassari and Bedick live in the hills in eastern Senegal around Kédougou. These are subgroups of the Tenda, same as the Coniagui and the Badiaranké.

- Senegal has among its population many Africans from other countries. There are small Ivorian communities in Dakar, as well as many Nigerians, most of which being Hausa. Malians go almost unnoticed in Senegal because their culture is so similar to that of the Senegalese. There is a large Cape Verdean community in Dakar. Moors, constituting 0.5% of the population of Senegal, have long invested in business in the country, residing mainly in cities in the north. The subgroup of the Darmankour, who have lived in Senegal for centuries, are present throughout the country.

Europeans and descendants of Lebanese migrants are fairly numerous in urban centres in Senegal, about 50,000. Most of the Lebanese originate from the Southern Lebanese city of Tyre, which is known as "Little West Africa" and has a main promenade that is called "Avenue du Senegal".

== Minor groups ==
There are also many other smaller representations of other ethnic groups in Senegal, including the Khassonké, the Lawbe and the Papel.

There are also small Chinese and Vietnamese migrant communities.

== See also ==
=== Related articles ===
- Languages of Senegal
- List of African ethnic groups
- Timeline of Serer history
- Serer ancient history

=== Bibliography ===
- Mara A. Leichtman (2005). "The legacy of transnational lives: Beyond the first generation of Lebanese in Senegal". Ethnic and Racial Studies. 28 (4): 663–686. doi:10.1080/13569320500092794. S2CID 144395215.
- Papa Oumar Fall, «The ethnolinguistic classification of Seereer in question», in Altmayer, Claus / Wolff, H. Ekkehard, Les défis du plurilinguisme en Afrique, Peter Lang, Frankfurt am Main, Berlin, Bern, Bruxelles, New York, Oxford, Wien, 2013, pp. 47–60
