= Ndut =

Ndut may refer to:

- the Ndut people
- the Ndut language mujhadAbbas
- the Ndut rite of passage
