= Palor people =

Ethnic group of Senegal

Palor
Total population
- 10,700 (2007)

Regions with significant populations

Languages
- Palor, French

Religion
- Serer religion, Christianity, Islam

Related ethnic groups
- Serer people

The Palors also known as Serer-Palor, (or Waro in their own language) among other names, are an ethnic group found in Senegal around the west central, west southwest of Thiès. They are a sub-group of the Serer ethnic group found in Senegal, the Gambia and Mauritania. Although ethnically Serers, they do not speak the Serer language but one of the Cangin languages. Their language is Palor.

== Other names ==
Other names for the Palor people include Waro (the name for themselves), Palors-Sile, Waro-Waro, Falor, Sili, Sili-Sili (the name they use for their language). The word Sili is a Palor word for Serer.

== History ==
According to Atlas National du Sénégal (Institut Géographique National 1977), their population was 5000. By 2007, their population was 10,700. They are found in the area of Diander, such as: Gorom, Sébikotane, Tieudem, Mbidjeum, etc.

The Palors are a member of the Cangin people (those who speak the Cangin languages) and a sub-group of the Serer people. In their oral history, the Palor and Ndut accepts a common origin and language. Their tradition went on to say that, the Palors moved southwards from the village of Palo (in the Ndut Region). Another account attributes the separation of the Palor and Ndut to a disagreement between two brothers, which led to the younger brother moving north out of the Palor Region in order to form the Ndut ethnic group. In similarity, the Saafi and Noon traditions states a common ancestral heritage. The Noon people used to return and pray at the Sacred wood they left behind in the Safen Region after they had migrated north. From a wider perspective, the Cangin people are part of the Serer group, and some of these group were defeated in the 11th century by the Almoravids and their African Muslim coalition army, when they advanced in Tekrur (present-day Futa Toro), resulting in the southward migration of some of these people, who refused to accept Islam (see Serer history (medieval era to present) and Timeline of Serer history).

The Palors, like many of the Cangin speakers residing on the Cayor and its borders, have a long reputation for waging wars against the Damel of Cayor, the Portuguese as well as the French. The name of their king was the Fara Ndout (variation : "Fara Ndut"). He was elected by the Damel from the royal family, and a candidate to the throne of Cayor. He had authority over the Nduts, the Palors and the region of Diander. In some cases, he was hardly listened to.

They are among the oldest inhabitants of Senegal, especially around Pout area (var : Put).

== Culture ==
The Palor language is classified as one of the Cangin languages which is closely related to the Ndut language and distantly related to Serer proper.

Many Palors are farmers who grow millet (a staple food among the Serers). They also grow and sell peanuts, manioc (cassava), mangoes, tomatoes, bissap (similar to the hibiscus flower), etc. Many Palors also work in the cities of Thiès and Dakar and even sometimes further afield at Kaolack in order to earn income and support their families. Unlike the other Serer groups, the Palors, especially those from poorer families, are at a disadvantage educationally, because there is little or no educational facilities in their own region. As a result, they have to send their children to boarding schools in Safene country (the lands of the Saafi people), such as Sangué, etc. Lack of educational facilities has resulted in Palor children not receiving formal education.

== Religion ==
Like many of the Cangin language speakers such as the Safene, etc., they adhere to the tenets of Serer religion. They make offerings of the harvest firstfruits to the ancestral spirits (Pangool - in Serer religion) and retain the "chef coutumier" ("one who performs prayers to the spirits" - the Serer Lamanes in the old religious sense, can also be the Saltigues, see Timeline of Serer history). Their traditional and religious songs are also preserved, usually sung in the Ndut language and forms the basis of Serer hymns.

Some Palors are Christians or Muslims. Like most Serer Muslims, their conversion to Islam is very recent. Though there are some Palor Muslim and Christian communities, syncretism with the Serer religion is prevalent.

== See also ==
- Niominka people
- Saafi people
- Serer people
- Serer-Laalaa
- Serer-Ndut people
- Serer-Noon
