= Paloor =

== Paloor ==
Paloor is part of the Valluvanad cultural region of central Kerala, an area historically associated with traditional Sanskrit learning, temple arts, and Ayurveda. The wider locality includes nearby Pulamanthole, which is associated with the traditional Ashtavaidya Ayurvedic heritage of Kerala and the Pulamanthole Mooss lineage.

The surrounding region has historically contributed to the preservation of classical Ayurvedic practices and related cultural traditions in Malappuram district.

- Paloor Kotta Falls, Kerala, India
- M. N. Paloor (1932–2018), Indian poet
- Paloor people, of Senegal
- Paloor language, their Cangin language
