= Ndut initiation rite =

Rite of passage as well as a religious education commanded by Serer religion

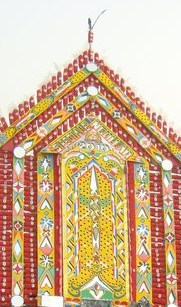
The Mbot masque. Symbol of the Ndut initiation rite

The Ndut is a circumcision rite of passage as well as a religious education commanded by Serer religion that every Serer (an ethnoreligious group and nation found in present-day Senegal, the Gambia and Mauritania) must go through once in their lifetime. The Serer people being an ethnoreligious group, the Ndut initiation rite is also linked to Serer culture. From the moment a Serer child is born, education plays a pivotal role throughout their life cycle. The ndut is one of these phases of their life cycle. In Serer society, education lasts a lifetime, from infancy to old age.

== Etymology ==
The name Ndut comes from the language of the Ndut people, a sub-group of the Serer people. In a religious sense, it means nest. It is a place of sanctuary, and the place where Serer boys lodge in preparation for their circumcision. This rite of passage is inspired by birds, and their nesting behaviour — hence why birds figure prominently in Serer religion, Serer creation myth, and symbolism. These boys are called njuli (initiates). The word njuli comes from the Serer word juul (variations: juu) which means a little boy's penis.

== Types ==
There are two main types of Ndut initiation rites. The first concerns the circumcision for Serer boys whilst the second concerns the initiation of Serer girls. Serer religion and culture forbids the circumcision of Serer girls (female genital mutilation). Only Serer boys are circumcised. Serer girls receive their initiation through njam or ndom (the tattooing of the gums). Preparation for the initiation starts early in childhood. In many cases, boys are circumcised when they reach 13 years old. However it is not uncommon for some to be circumcised when they are 19 to 26 years old. Likewise, Serer girls receive their initiation when they are 11 to 18 years.

== Purpose ==
The purpose of this initiation is to mark the transition from childhood to adulthood. It is also to teach young Serers how to be good, brave and honourable citizens. In Serer society, a Serer man who has not undergone the Ndut initiation rite is not deemed to be man. It is also taboo for a Serer woman to marry a Serer man who has not been circumcised. In a religious and hygienic point of view, an uncircumcised penis is deemed uncleanly and impure. Likewise, in old Serer culture, a Serer woman who has not undergone the njam was not deemed to be a real woman. Though prejudice against Serer women who have not undergone the njam is less prevalent nowadays due to modernity, prejudice against Serer men who have not undergone circumcision still prevails in Serer culture.

== Preparation for the Ndut ==
The preparation for the Ndut takes several years, and involves the participation of the whole family and lineages (both maternal and paternal) as well as the community. It is a long process where physical, psychological, spiritual and economic factors all come into play, in preparation for the child before the actual act of circumcision (for boys) or njam (for girls). The entire family play a vital role in preparing the child for this journey.

Before a Serer boy is circumcised, he must make a public pronouncements called "Kan boppam" in Serer. This public pronouncements is made in the form of a poem ("ciid" in Serer language) or song. One of these chants is given below:

"Duma daw Saala Saala maa ko dige" (I will not avoid the knife because I requested it).

=== Role of women ===
In the initiation of both Serer boys and girls, Serer women play an important role. Although women are forbidden to participate in the actual act of circumcision or to enter the Ndut (the nest sanctuary), the boy's female family play an important role before and after the act of circumcision. They are part of the family unit that helps the child to prepare for the circumcision. It is not only the male relatives who helps the child, but the whole family. The child's paternal aunt (his father's sister) would give a bracelet (usually silver) to the child to be worn on his left arm as a sign of good luck. In most cases, it is the father who give the child this bracelet as protection. Just after the circumcision, the boy's mother would sometimes even breast feed the child for the last time. This breast feeding act is symbolic of rebirth after death, and requires "the ingestion of lifegiving nourishment from the mother". Thus the woman is seen as a giver of life and the protection of life. The importance of women is best preserved in the Serer mythology of Mama ("the grandmother" in Serer language) :

"Mama swallows those who have undergone initiation and then spits them out again. She is an invisible spirit for the initiates (in her presence, the initiates must lower their heads and close their eyes). Mama appears as soon as the circumcised men have begun to chant, with all their strength, the songs which are dedicated to her."

== Structure ==
The structure of a Serer girl's initiation is somewhat similar to the structure of a Serer boy's initiation. For a Serer girl, the njam surgery is performed by an elderly woman with her helpers. These elderly women have undergone the surgery themselves. One of the head of these women is called the njamkat. She is the one who will perform the operation (tattoo of the gums). The circumcision of Serer boys is also performed in a structured situation. It involves the circumciser and his helpers as well as a person who supervises the operation. This supervisor is the master of the circumcision ("kumax" in Serer). He is the eldest male in the community and must possess all the qualities of a good kumax, which include: generosity, supportive and patience. All the men involved in the rite of passage must have undergone the operation themselves. A boy and his age group are usually circumcised together, under the guidance of the selbe (the person who accompanies the children to be circumcised). They form a pact of brotherhood.

=== Location ===
The building where the circumcision takes place is called the ndut (nest). It is a temporary hut far away from the town or village. It is temporary because the hut must be set on fire just after the initiation. The burning of the ndut is symbolic. It represents that the sanctuary the initiates have been living in for the past three months, shut off from the outside world was only a dream, an artificial place that does not exist in real life. However, they can refer back to the dream and use what they have learned from the dream when faced with the dangers of real life. It is also taboo for a child to attend the same ndut where his father has received his circumcision. Upon arrival in this sacred place, the boys chant the names of the Pangool (singular: Fangol, Serer saints and ancestral spirits) :

"Fadid, Fango, Invey ngara, Fadid, Fangol Invey ngara" (come here, Fangol we arrived. Come here, Fangol).

Reciting this verse acknowledges the ancestors who have long departed, and are called upon to come near and protect the children from any bad spirit or evil that may befall the ndut especially at night.

=== Education ===
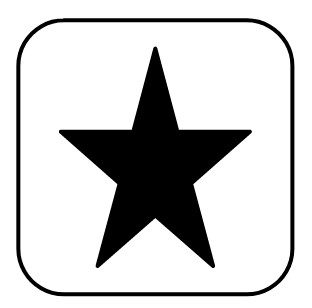
Yoonir, symbol of the Universe.

The ndut is also a place for education. In classical ndut teachings, initiates get to learn about themselves, teamwork, how to be upstanding citizens, history of the Serer people, the supernatural world, Serer creation myth, the cosmos, mysteries of the universe and the formation of the stars etc. Every morning, a dream interpretation exercise takes place. These exercise guide the children as to how to analysis each other's dreams as well as their own, and helps them develop their skills of clairvoyancy. It is also a place where they receive their sex education, especially among the older members of the initiates. These young men are told not to engage in sexual activities with women until their operation has healed. The ceremony of washing is also emphasised. This helps in the healing process. The first ceremony of washing takes place near the ndut. Washing symbolizes purification.

Children compose songs, sing and dance together. This exercise helps them to forget the actual circumcision pending. It also develops their artistic and team working skills. Friendships and brotherhood are formed which last a lifetime. Most of these songs are religious in nature. It is from these religious songs that the njuup tradition derives from (a conservative Serer music, and the progenitor of mbalax).

=== Operation ===
After years of preparation, comes the actual act of circumcision for boys or njam for girls. This is where they test their honour according to the Serer principle of Jom - a code of beliefs and values that govern Serer lives. Jom in Serer means honour. The child must show no signs of anxiousness or fright. They must show bravery from start to finish, and must not twitch or cry during the operation. If the child shows signs of nervousness or fright just before the operation, the operation will not go ahead. It means that the child's family have not prepared the child sufficiently for this operation. The parents are judged according to the child's behaviour. In these circumstances, the kumax or njamkat will ask the family to take the child and reassure him or her then bring them back later. If the child has been reassured by the family then brought back later for the operation but they are still anxious, then the operation is cancelled. Serer religion dictates that, in circumstances like these, the child should not be humiliated. Instead, they should be encouraged and supported with words of praise and better prepared for the operation next time. In spite of these religious commandments, the Serer people being governed by the code of Jom, it was not uncommon for some Serer parents and family members to commit suicide because of what they viewed as humiliation or dishonour of the family name. Suicide is only permitted if it satisfies the Jom principle (see Serer religion).

If the boy shows no sign of anxiety, he is encouraged to open the tissue covering the head of the penis. In Serer, this is called "war o sumtax" (to kill the foreskin). The word "war" (as in War Jabi) means to kill in Serer. The boy to be circumcised would seat on a mortar with his legs opened. He must muster the courage to do this on his own and should not be forced. The mortar symbolises the feminine world, and after the boy has been circumcised, he must never sit on a mortar again. Before the circumciser starts the operation, he ask the boy for forgiveness. He would utter the word waasanaam (please forgive me), and the boy would usually answer waasanaaong (I forgive you). This is a symbolic gesture of respect, communion and spirituality. It shows that the circumciser is well aware of the pain he is about to inflict, as he has undergone the operation himself and any mistake may result in death and tars his professional reputation forever.

The blade is sterilized before the actual circumcision in order to avoid infection. After the foreskin has been removed, a special kind of powder is applied on the penis to avoid infection and help in the healing process.

== End of initiation ==
After several weeks, usually three months, the initiates finish their rite of passage and go home. The ndut is set a blaze. Children receive presents from family members. In pre-colonial times, the boys would perform a dance in front of the Serer kings and the rest of the royal family who would in turn give them presents for their courage (see Maad a Sinig Kumba Ndoffene Famak Joof).

== See also ==
- Timeline of Serer history
- Lamane
- Roog (Serer deity)
- Koox (Serer deity)
- Circumcision in Africa
