= Henry Gravrand =

French anthropologist

Father Henry Gravrand
- Born: Henry Gravrand; 1921; France
- Died: 11 July 2003 (aged 81–82); Abbey of Latrun (in Palestine)
- Other names: Henri Gravrand, Charbel Henri Gravrand
- Occupations: anthropologist, author, essayist, historian, priest
- Known for: Serer religion, Serer ancient history
- Notable work: La civilisation sereer

Father Henry Gravrand (France, 1921 – Abbey of Latrun, Palestine, 11 July 2003) was a French Catholic missionary to Africa and an anthropologist who has written extensively on Serer religion and culture. He was one of the leading pioneers of interfaith dialog and believed that African religion was the "'first covenant between God and man". His works about the Serer people are cited by other historians and scholars writing on Serer history, religion and culture, for instance Martin A. Klein, Charles Becker, Alioune Sarr, Marguerite Dupire, Issa Laye Thiaw, etc. Papa Massène Sene argues that his approach lacks scientific rigor and include fundamental linguistic and historical errors. Alioune Sarr noted that Gravrand reported an oral tradition describing what he called the "Battle of Troubang", a dynastic war between the two maternal royal houses of Ñaanco and the Guelowar, an off-shot and relatives of the Ñaanco (Nyanthio or Nyanco) maternal dynasty of Kaabu, in modern-day Guinea Bissau. According to Charles Becker, Gravrand is confusing a description of the 1867 (or 1865) Battle of Kansala.

== Biography ==
First missionary of the Congregation of Holy Spirit, Gravrand arrived in Senegal on 28 December 1948 and lived there for 40 years in the Sine area (the western part of the country). In Sine, he founded a mission and oversaw the evangelization of some of the Serer community, but also studied the history, religion and culture of the Serer people and became one of the leading scholars of Serer religion and culture.

In 1955, Gravrand created the Union of farmers of Sine, affiliated to the French Confederation of Christian Workers (CFTC), which gave the farmers training enabling them to defend their own interests.

Gravrand was a specialist on Traditional African religion, in particular the Serer religion, and in 1962 published a paper titled "Visage africain de l'Église : une expérience au Sénégal". In 1964, Gravrand was one of the founder-members of the Pontifical Council for Interreligious Dialogue.

In October 1970, Gravrand was appointed parish priest of M'Bour and Dean of the Petite Côte.

The year 1987 marked the Silver Jubilee of the episcopate of the Archbishop of Dakar (its 25th anniversary). That same year, the apostolate of father Gravrand in Senegal came to an end. After the death Joseph Faye (a Trappist), who was the first apostolic prefect of Ziguinchor, Gravrand in turn took to the habit of a Cistercian monk at the Aiguebelle Abbey on 23 December 1987, under the name of Blessed Charbel (Saint Charbel – a 19th century Lebanese Maronite monk).

Gravrand took his solemn vows in 1990 and was sent to the Monastery of the Holy Saviour in Lebanon. Gravrand died on 11 July 2003 at the Abbey of Latrun.

== Selected publications ==
- "Rites d'initiation et vie en société chez les Sérères du Sénégal", Afrique Documents, no.52, July–August 1960, pp. 129–144
- "Visage africain de l'Église : une expérience au Sénégal", Orante, Paris, 1961, p. 287.
- "À la rencontre des religions africaines", Ancora, Rome, 1969
- "Le Lup Serer comparé au Ndoep des Lebou : psychothérapie des possédés", Congrès international des Africanistes, deuxième session, Dakar, [11–22 December 1967], Présence africaine, Paris, 1972, pp. 237–243
- "Le symbolisme Serer", Psychopathologie Africaine, vol. IX, no. 2, 1973, pp. 237–266
- "Le Gabou dans les traditions orales du Ngabou", Éthiopiques (revue), no. 28, October 1981
- "L’héritage spirituel Sereer : valeur traditionnelle d'hier, d'aujourd'hui et de demain", Éthiopiques (revue), no. 31, 3e trimestre 1982
- La civilisation sereer, vol. I, "Cosaan", Nouvelles éditions africaines, Dakar, 1983
- "Rites et symboles sereer face au sacré, Médiations africaines du sacré : célébration crematories et langage religieux", actes du 3e colloque international du ERA, Kinshasa [16–22 February 1986], Faculté de théologie catholique de Kinshasa, 1987, pp 125–143
- La civilisation sereer, vol. II, "Pangool", Nouvelles éditions africaines, Dakar, 1990
- "Fils de Saint-Bernard en Afrique : une fondation au Cameroun, 1950–1990", Beauchesne, Paris, 1990, p. 181

== See also ==
- Pangool
- Roman Catholicism in Senegal

== Notes ==
=== Bibliography ===
- Joseph Roger de Benoist, Histoire de l'Église catholique au Sénégal du milieu du XVe siècle à l'aube du troisième millénaire, Karthala, Paris, 2008, p. 581 [several references]
- Edition: illustrated. Penguin UK, 2005. ISBN 0-14-044945-0, chapter 67
- Klein, Martin A. "Islam and Imperialism in Senegal Sine-Saloum, 1847–1914", Edinburgh University Press (1968).
- Crétois, Léonce; & Becker, Charles; "Le vocabulaire sereer de la faune", (Editor: Charles Becker), Centre de linguistique appliquée de Dakar (1983)
- Dupire, Marguerite, "Sagesse sereer : essais sur la pensée sereer ndut", Karthala, Paris, 1994, ISBN 2-86537-487-4
- Thiaw, Issa Laye, "La femme Seereer", Sénégal, 2005, Sociétés africaines et diaspora, Edition L'harmattan, ISBN 2-7475-8907-2
- Jean-Paul Bourdier and Trinh T. Minh-ha, "Drawings from African dwellings", Indiana University Press, Bloomington, 1996. [in] JSTOR by Peter Mark (Review)
