= Serer-Ndut people =

Senegalese ethnic group

Serer Kings
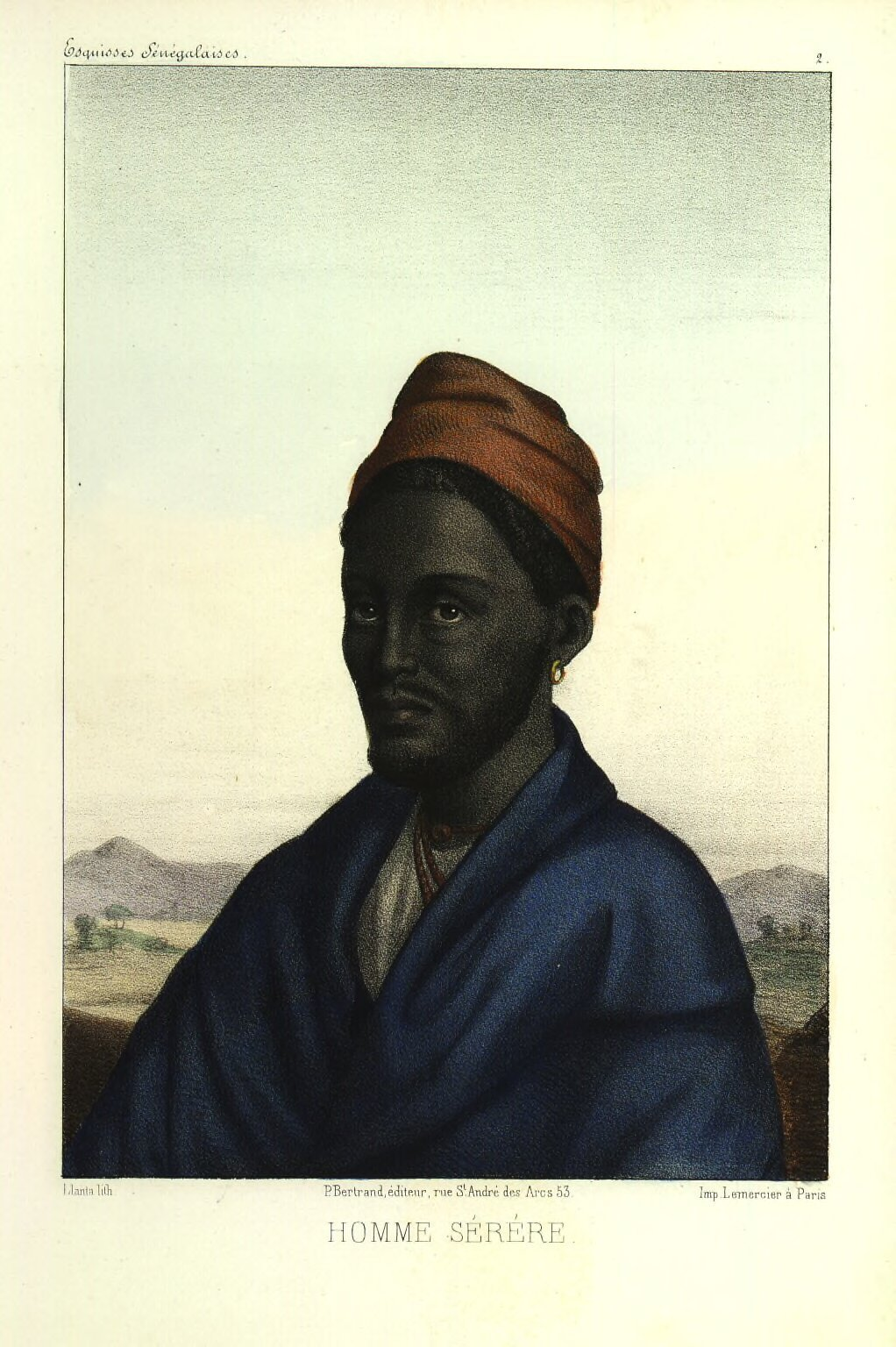
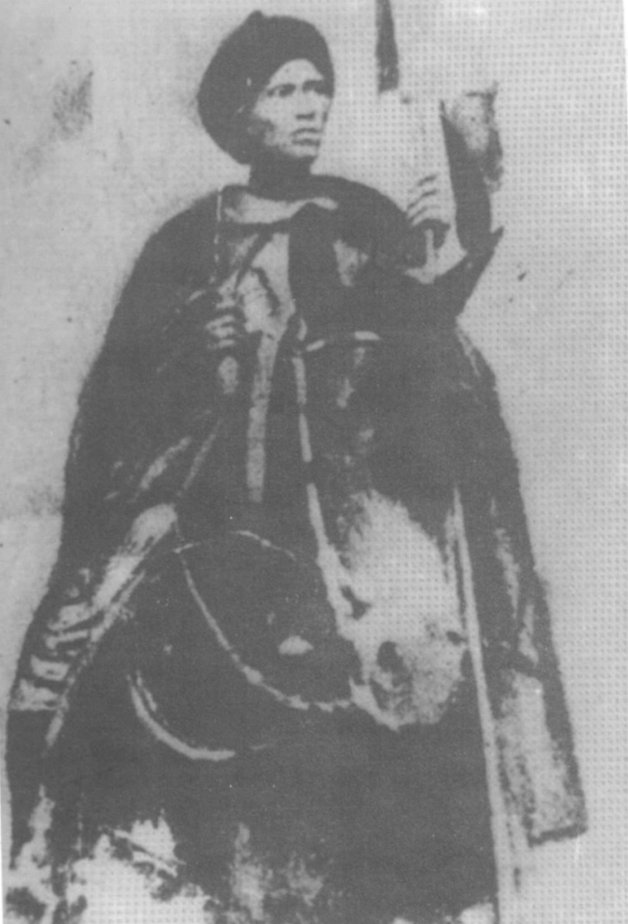
Kings of Sine (left to right) : Maad a Sinig Ama Joof Gnilane Faye Joof and Maad a Sinig Kumba Ndoffene Fa Ndeb Joof.

The Serer-Ndut or Ndut also spelt (Ndoute or N'doute) are an ethnic group in Senegal numbering 38600. They are part of the Serer people who collectively make up the third largest ethnic group in Senegal. The Serer-Ndut live mostly in western Senegal in the district of Mont-Roland, northwest of the city of Thiès.

== Culture ==
Their language Ndut, is one of the Cangin languages, closely related to Palor. Like the other Cangin languages, the speakers are ethnically Serers but they do not speak the Serer-Sine language.

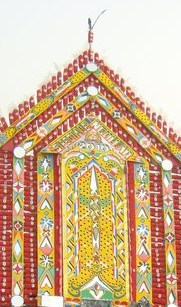
Symbol of the Ndut initiation rite, a rite of passage in Serer religion and culture.

Their language is not a dialect of Serer-Sine (or Serer proper). The people are agriculturalists and lake fishermen.

== Religion ==
Serer-Ndut people traditionally and still practice the Serer religion which involves honouring the ancestors covering all dimensions of life, death, cosmology etc. Their name for the Supreme Deity (Roog - in Serer religion) is Kopé Tiatie Cac - (God the grandfather in the Ndut language). The Ndut initiation rite, a rite of passage in Serer religion takes its name from the Ndut language. Some Serer-Ndut are Catholic. The main Catholic mission is at the town of Tiin.

== History ==
The Serer people to which they are a sub-group of are the oldest inhabitants of Senegambia along with the Jola people. Their ancestors were dispersed throughout the Senegambia Region and it is suggested that they built the Senegambian stone circles although other sources suggest it was probably the Jola.

The Ndut were also the original founders of Biffeche as well as the Mt Rolland. During the colonial period of Senegal, both the French administration and the Muslim communities of Senegal tried to annihilate the Serer-Ndut people. They failed to achieve their objectives.

== Bibliography ==
- Thiaw, Issa Laye, "La Religiosite de Seereer, avant et pendant leur Islamisation", [in] Ethiopiques no: 54, Revue semestrielle de Culture Négro-Africaine, Nouvelle série, volume 7, 2e Semestre (1991)
- Dione, Salif, "L'APPEL du Ndut. ou l'initiation des garcons Seereer", IFAN Cheikh Anta Diop (2004)
- Gravrand, Henry, "La Civilisation Sereer - Pangool", vol.2, Les Nouvelles Editions Africaines du Senegal, (1990), p 9 and 77, ISBN 2-7236-1055-1
- Echenberg, Myron J, "Black death, white medicine: bubonic plague and the politics of public health in colonial Senegal, 1914-1945", pp 141–146, Heinemann (2002), ISBN 0-325-07017-2
- Gravrand, Henry, "La civilisation Sereer - Cosaan : les origines, vol.1, pp. 140–146, Nouvelles Editions Africaines, 1983, ISBN 2-7236-0877-8
- Dupire, Marguerite, "Sagesse sereer: Essais sur la pensée sereer ndut":
- Becker, Charles, "Les Serer Ndut: Études sur les mutations sociales et religieuses", Microéditions Hachette (1974)
- Klein, Martin A., "Islam and Imperialism in Senegal, Sine-Saloum" 1847–1914, pp VII-5, Edinburgh University Press, (1968), ISBN 0-85224-029-5
- Daggs, Elisa, "All Africa: All its political entities of independent or other status", Hasting House, (1970), ISBN 0-8038-0336-2
- Taal, Alhaji Ebou Momar, "Senegambian Ethnic Groups: Common Origins and Cultural Affinities Factors and Forces of National Unity, Peace and Stability" (2010)
- Gamble, David P., & Salmon, Linda K., (with Njie, Alhaji Hassan), "Gambian Studies No. 17 : People of The Gambia. I. The Wolof, with notes on the Serer and Lebou", San Francisco (1985)
