= Saafi people =

Ethnic group of Senegal

The Saafi people, also called Serer-Safene, Safene, etc., are an ethnic group found in Senegal. Ethnically, they are part of the Serer people but do not speak the Serer language nor a dialect of it. Their language Saafi is classed as one of the Cangin languages. In Senegal, they occupy Dakar and the Thiès Region.

== Religion ==
The Saafi mainly adhere to the tenets of Serer religion.

Shrines are of the utmost importance to the Saafi people. The characteristics of each shrine are different. There is a general discourse about the protecting power of the shrines and the spirits that inhabit them echoing the main themes of the ethnic boundary described earlier. Each Saafi village had at least one shrine; and the shrines, each of which had a name and specific characteristics, defined a public sphere of religious ritual that was common to the village. Bandia had the Koffki, Guinabour had Graam and a sacred well, Tchiki had Carit and Enge (an ancestral shrine), Kirène had Jayña, Ndiass (or Diass) had Sahee, Dobour had a spring with healing waters. Each shrine was controlled or administered by a particular matrilineal clan, and one clan, the Leemu, controlled most of the shrines. All the shrines served as focal points for the divination ceremonies held before the beginning of the rainy season. Most were sites of periodic sacrifice to the indwelling spirits, but the shrines had their own unique characteristics. In addition to possessing the one judging shrine that could kill, Bandia played a key role in the prayers to Koox (the atmospheric supreme God), that occurred only in serious times of drought that threatened the entire district. The shrines at Guinabour (Graam) and Diass (Sahee) could be described as wind spirits. They protected the villages by raising a wind that made them invisible to their enemies, particularly the Wolof. In more general terms, past migrations into the region and the founding of village shrines are essential features of Saafi identity and the system of defense that protected the independence of the region.

== Culture ==
Unlike the Serer-Sine, and most ethnic groups of the Sene-Gambian region, the Saafi people do not have a caste system of griots, slaves, nobility, leather workers, etc. They were ruled over by the heads of the ten matriclans. They rejected Islam, monarchy (centralized government of any kind) and the social distinctions that went along with it, specifically caste and slavery. The Saafi society is purely egalitarian.

The Saafi people inhabit a fertile, well-watered region on the downward slope and valleys of an escarpment with underground streams feeding into the Somone River. Fertility permits relatively intense farming combined with herding cattle and goats, a combination crucial to the Saafi identity and social institutions.

The male life cycle is particular tied to the combination of farming and herding. Boys herd from approximately eight or ten years old until the age of initiation, which occurs between fifteen and twenty years of age. After being called by the father (in consultation with the maternal uncle) to circumcision, the boys enter an age class of initiates made up of forty to sixty young men. After a celebration, the boys are circumcised in a special enclosure where they spend three months studying cosaan (a term corresponding to history, culture, etc.) by learning songs and their meaning. By the end of the period, sustained by meat feasts supplied by fathers and uncles, the initiates emerge as an age class of bachelors with their own secret song. These bachelors receive the weapons and tools of men as gifts from the father, but from this point on they farm for themselves and their uncles. The age class is bound together for the rest of their lives, helping each other to farm, fight, raid (in particular, European colonizers - see Timeline of Serer history), and marry. Married men continue farming but leave the bachelor class. The age classes gathered together males from all clans, and they were the main potential counterweight to the power of the clan leaders. Although the bachelor class formed the military class, people placed greater stress on the protecting power of the village shrines.

== Language ==
They speak the Saafi language which is part of the Niger–Congo family. Their language is the principal Cangin language and is closer to Palor and Laalaa. In Serer symbols and symbolism, the Saafi people have contributed to many of these symbols. Although not true writing within the definition of the word, Henry Gravrand posits that communication is possible between those who can decipher it, who are usually the initiated. It has been suggested that the mere fact of coming from a Serer heritage does not necessarily equate to having the ability to decipher the symbols, but requires initiation and patience.

[...] the ability to decipher a Serer symbol, for example, does not automatically follow from membership in this group nor from having simply lived with these people, the knowledge of signs is neither innate nor acquired by mere association, but rather the result of a long and patient apprenticeship.
