= Pangool =

Ancient saints and ancestral spirits of the Serer people

Pangool (in Serer and Cangin) singular: Fangool (var : Pangol and Fangol), are the ancient saints and ancestral spirits of the Serer people of Senegal, the Gambia and Mauritania. The Pangool play a crucial role in Serer religion and history. In a religious sense, they act as interceders between the living world and the supreme being Roog or Koox. In a historical sense, the ancient Serer village and town founders called Lamanes were believed to be accompanied by a group of Pangool as they travelled in search of land to exploit. These Lamanes became guardians of Serer religion and created shrines in honour of the Pangool, thus becoming the custodians of the "Pangool cult". (Note: The Serer do not refer to their religious practices as cults. They refer to these supernatural beings simply as Pangool, singular — Fangool. The word "cult" has negative and pejorative connotations especially when referring to other people's spiritual beliefs and traditions.)

There are several Pangool in Serer religion and each one is associated with a specific attribute, have their own sacred place of worship, means of worship, etc. These places of worship are often trees or groves. The symbol of the Pangool is the serpent, represented by two coiled black snakes.

== Etymology and terminology ==
- Fangool – the singular of Pangool
- Pangool – a group of Fangool
- O Yaal Pangool (var : yaal pangool) – the "masters of the Pangool cult", i.e. the Serer priestly class – Saltigues, previously the Lamanic class.
- Pangool ke – the ancestors

The etymology of Fangool comes from the Serer phrase Fang Qool which means the sacred serpent the plural of which is Pangool. Fangool means serpent. Qool itself (and it many spelling variations) derives from the sacred nqual tree (Serer proper: NGawul or Ngaul, Latin: mitragyna inermis) referenced in the Serer creation myth as one of the primordial trees.

== Types ==
There are two main types of Pangool: non-human Pangool and human Pangool. Both are sacred and ancient, but the former is more ancient as a general rule. The non-human Pangool include ancient sacred places with vital spiritual energies and personalized as such. These Pangool generally are the personifications of natural forces. Human Pangool on the other hand became Pangool once they are canonized after death. Thus some are ancient, others are medieval. Through their intercession with the divine, they form a link which transmits vital energies. Not every dead ancient ancestor is canonized as Pangool.

Pangool can be subdivided further into:

1. Pangool who are known and revered in a particular region, such as the tombs of ancient Serer kings and queens (see Serer ancient history and Serer creation myth)
2. Pangool who are known and revered in a particular village or town, such as the Serer village or town founders
3. Pangool who are known, revered and venerated in a particular square such as the founder of the square
4. A Fangool made known to an individual and thus became the personal Fangool of the individual in question, such as the Fangool Ginaaru (the personal Fangool of Maad a Sinig Maysa Wali Jaxateh Manneh, var: Maysa Waaly Dione, the first Guelowar king of Sine, reigned: 1350–1370).
5. Pangool whose names are lost to history or did not disclose their identity, but are well known for certain events in Serer history, such as the seizure of certain historical figures, etc.

In addition to these, Pangool can be further categorized depending on their character and nature, such as:

1. Blood or red Pangool: those who require the sacrifice of domesticated animals (i.e. cattle) in their veneration, or alcohol
2. Milk Pangool: those who require the offerings of milk
3. Water Pangool: those who reside in water, etc.,

Blood is a sign of life in Serer cosmogony and these types of Pangool fulfill a vital role in Serer society, and are seen as one of the most ancient and powerful. The Fangool Ngolum Joof (var: Ngolum Diouf) is one of these blood Pangool. In many cases, offerings of alcohol rather than the sacrifice of domesticated animals are made to these blood Pangool. In contrast to the blood Pangool, the milk Pangool such as Moussa Sarr, Njemeh (var: Ndiémé) of Languème and Njoxona, etc., are those Pangool who are peaceful in nature and character. They even reject anything that symbolizes violence or things that may evoke destruction or death, i.e. iron, weapons, gunpowder, blood and the colour red. They usually are the protectors of Serer cities and the defenders of the weak.

== History ==
=== Early history ===
The history regarding the veneration of the Pangool is found within the hermeneutics of Serer religion, oral tradition and archaeological discoveries. Prior to the widespread veneration of the Pangool, the religious habit of the ancient Serers included holding prayers at the beginning of the rainy season. The branches of the Njambayargin tree (bauhinia rufescens) were fetched by these ancient people because they believed the tree to possess elements which boosted the growth of their crops and produce much fruit. Ritual prayers were made to the supreme spirit Roog (or Koox among the Cangin), totally distinct from the prayers that would later become afforded to other Serer spiritual entities such as the Pangool. In Serer cosmogony, trees play a vital role in the creation narrative, as they were the first things created on Earth by the divine, followed by animals (non-humans). The exact date as to when the veneration of the Pangool became prevalent cannot be stated with a degree of accuracy.

=== Medieval Era ===
Lamane Jegan Joof founder of Tukar c. 11th century, is reported to have been accompanied by a group of Pangool when he migrated from Lambaye with his brother Ndik following a disagreement with his relative the king of Lambaye. After his migration, he founded Tukar, previously in the Serer pre-colonial Kingdom of Sine, now part of independent Senegal. Tukar is one of the Serer holy sites, and the Pangool affiliated with it are devotedly venerated in the Serer religious calendar, such as the 'Raan festival which takes place once a year on the second Thursday after the new moon in April. The descendants of Lamane Jegan Joof (the Joof family of Tukar) play a vital role in this religious affair.

== Serer religion ==
The Pangool are related to the transcendence of the divine. In the Serer home, the altar of the Pangool can not conceal that of the divine.

The Pangool provide the vital energies relating to the realities of the Serer people especially those forces outside the control of humanity. The religious practices and representations of the Pangool helps the Serer people dominate the hostile forces of nature, hence the advent of the Pangool veneration. Through their sacred intercession with the divine, these Pangool act as protectors and transmitters of vital energy to the world of the living. They can be humans, plants, animals, places, supernatural beings, etc. Animals and trees are viewed by the Serers as extended relatives of human beings, because they came from the same divine placenta at the time of the coronation.

Many Pangool are spirits of early ancestors who had died. They represent both Pangool of the paternal line (pangool o kurcala) and those of the maternal line (pangool o ƭeen yaay). These ancestors guide and protect their descendants. Many Serer families have a Master of Pangool who knows how to evokes the ancestor. The earlier Pangool were not human beings, but superior beings created by Roog at the time human beings were created. They were believed to have been created by the divine in order to help human kind. It is for this reason why the terms Pangool and Nguus (Serer word for genie) are sometimes used interchangeably. Because some Pangool are linked to Serer lineages, only the head of the lineage schooled in the rituals can make a libation to the relevant Pangool or Fangool (the ancestor).

In the other world, the ancestors are the actual carrying-holders of transcendent sacred energies. However, the Pangool are superior in title because they were not transformed in the sacred energy. Thus the distinction between a Fangool (non-human) and a human-ancestor lies in the mode of their participation in the transcendence. In either case, Roog is the first source of the transcendence of sacred energies.

Offerings of fruits, vegetables, crops, milk, or the sacrifice of domesticated animals are made to the Pangool in different places, e.g.: at the foot of trees, in forests, at community shrines, etc. There are Pangools whose scope is therapeutic, those who deliver justice (see also Takhar – spirit of justice) and those who are personal Pangool.

== List of Serer Pangool ==
The following table provides a sample of Pangool, their attributes and the part of Serer country they protect :

Name of Fangool	Protector of	Attributes / comments
Laga Ndong	Foundiougne Department (Djilor and Peithie)	Canonized king of the Pangool during the reign of Maad a Sinig Waasila Faye (king of Sine, in the 15th century). Homage made to him at the festival of Tourou Peithie, one of the religious festivals in the Serer calendar. Veneration headed by the Taa'boor matriclan (var : Tabor).
Njoxona	Nakhar village in Nakhar	Village founded by Jaan Fadé represented by the python. Homage headed by the Jaan clan. Njoxona is a milk Fangool.
Mindiss (var : Mindis)	Fatick Region	A female protector of the Fatick Region, offering made to the River Sine. She appears to humans in the form of a manatee, one of the best known Fangool. She possess the attributes of a typical water Fangool, yet at the same time she is a blood Fangool.
Julang Joof and Ngojil Joof	Ngol and several others	Husband and wife protectors of Ngol and several villages and towns within its vicinity, where the ceremony and offerings are made to the sacred tree of Ñaawul (var : Naawul) believed to be the sacred tree of these two. Headed by the Joof family.
Ngolum Joof (var : Ngolum Diouf, proper : Ngolum Juuf)	Nianiane	Offerings are made at the village of Nianiane (founded by Nokhor Choro Joof) to the Ngane and baobab tree. Headed by the Joof family and the Karé-Karé matriclan. He is a blood Fangool.
Lunguñ Joof (Serer proper : Lunguñ Juuf)	FA Oye, Ngouye and Tukar.	A typical Fangool that delivers justice and have many devotees. Canonized at the time of Lamane Jegan Joof. Headed by the Joof family.
Ginaaru	Personal	Personal Fangool of Maad a Sinig Maysa Wali Jaxateh Manneh (var : Maysa Waaly Dione), king of Sine, reigned : 1350–1370.
Njemeh (var : Ndiémé)	Languème	Njemeh is one of the milk Pangool.
Moussa Sarr (or : Saar)	?	A milk Fangool.
Harwak	Fayil	Veneration headed by the Cofaan matriclan.
Tamba Faye	Ndiob	According to Serer oral tradition, during the reigne of Maad a Sinig Boukar Tjilas Mahe Soum Joof (king of Sine, c. 1750 – 1763), the Maad a Sinig came into conflict with the great Fangool of Ndiob – Tamba Faye.

== See also ==
- Ciiɗ (Serer religion)
- Nommo
- Snakes in mythology
- Ancestor worship

== Bibliography ==
- Gravrand, Henry, "La Civilisation Sereer – Pangool", vol.2, Les Nouvelles Editions Africaines du Senegal, (1990), ISBN 2-7236-1055-1
- Gravrand, Henry, "La civilisation Sereer, VOL.1, Cosaan : les origines", Nouvelles Editions africaines (1983), ISBN 2723608778
- Kalis, Simone, "Médecine traditionnelle, religion et divination ches les Seereer Siin du Sénégal" –La connaissance de la nuit, L’Harmattan (1997), ISBN 2-7384-5196-9
- Faye, Louis Diène, "Mort et Naissance le monde Sereer", Les Nouvelles Editions Africaines (1983), ISBN 2-7236-0868-9
- Galvan, Dennis Charles, "The State Must Be Our Master of Fire : How Peasants Craft Culturally Sustainable Development in Senegal", Berkeley, University of California Press (2004)
- Lericollais, André, "La mort des arbres à Sob, en pays Sereer" (Sénégal), pp 3–5
- Niangoran-Bouah, Georges, "L'univers Akan des poids à peser l'or : les poids dans la société", Les nouvelles éditions africaines – MLB, (1987), ISBN 2723614034
- Lericollais, André, « La gestion du paysage ? Sahélisation, surexploitation et délaissement des terroirs sereer au Sénégal », Afrique de l'ouest, Dakar (21–26 November 1988), ORSTOM . For the name of Serer medicinal plants and their corresponding Latin names, see: Nqaul is spelt Ngaul (p. 8), Mbos (pp. 5 & 8), Somb (p. 8), Ngud (p. 8), Nalafun (p. 8), Ngol (p. 8), Saas is spelt Sas (p. 5), and (retrieved 13 March 2025)
- Universität Frankfurt am Main, Frobenius-Institut, Deutsche Gesellschaft für Kulturmorphologie, Frobenius Gesellschaft, "Paideuma: Mitteilungen zur Kulturkunde, Volumes 43–44", F. Steiner (1997), pp 144–5, (Henry Gravrand, "La civilisation Sereer -Pangool" [in]) ISBN 3515028420
- Bressers, Hans, Rosenbaum, Walter A., Achieving sustainable development: the challenge of governance across social scales, Greenwood Publishing Group, (2003) p. 151 ISBN 0275978028
- Niang, Mor Sadio, "CEREMONIES ET FÊTES TRADITIONNELLES", [in] Ethiopiques n^{o} 31 révue socialiste de culture négro-africaine 3e trimestre (1982)
- Martin, Victor & Becker, Charles, "Lieux de culte et emplacements célèbres dans les pays sereer" (Sénégal), Publié dans le Bulletin de l’Institut Fondamental d'Afrique Noire, Tome 41, Série B, n° 1, janvier 1979, p. 133–189 (p 15)
- R. P. Crétois, Dictionnaire Sereer-Français, Dakar, CLAD, t. 1 (1972), t. 2 (1973), t. 3 (1974), t. 4 (1975), t. 5 (1976), t. 6 (1977), passim. [in] Martin, Victor & Becker, Charles, "Lieux de culte et emplacements célèbres dans les pays sereer"
- Abbé L. Diouf, L’homme dans le monde (Vision sereer), communication aux Journées Africaines de Théologie, polygraphié, s. d., p. 6. [in] Martin, Victor & Becker, Charles, "Lieux de culte et emplacements célèbres dans les pays sereer"
- Sarr, Alioune, "Histoire du Sine-Saloum" (Sénégal), Introduction, bibliographie et notes par Charles Becker. Version légèrement remaniée par rapport à celle qui est parue en 1986–87. p 19
- Diouf, Niokhobaye, "Chronique du royaume du Sine", Suivie de notes sur les traditions orales et les sources écrites concernant le royaume du Sine par Charles Becker et Victor Martin. (1972). Bulletin de l'Ifan, Tome 34, Série B, n° 4, (1972). pp 723 (p 14)
