= Roog =

Supreme God and creator of the Serer religion of the Senegambia region

Roog or Rog (Koox in Cangin Saafi) is the Supreme God and creator of the Serer religion of the Senegambia region.

== Names and titles ==
In Serer, roog means sky or the heavens.

Roog is sometimes referred to as Roog Sene (Rog Seen, Rog Sene, Rooh Seen, etc.) which means Roog the Immensity, or by extension, the merciful god. Other titles which are used outside of prayers include Roog Dangandeer Seen ("Roog the omnipresent", by extension it can also mean "the Omnipresent God"), Roog o Caaci’in Seen (Roog our ancestor), Roog o maak Seen [or "Roog a faha"] (Roog is great), Roog a yaal'in Seen (Roog our Lord), Roog o Ndimaan Seen (Roog! The giver of the fruit [or life]), and "The Master of the World".

The name Roog is probably a corruption of the deity Koox. This may stem from the Serers of Kaabu or Tekrur (present-day Futa Tooro in Senegal) after their exodus in the 11th century from Takrur following their religious persecution. According to the oral tradition of the Cangin, the original name of the supreme being was Kooh.

== Beliefs ==
Roog is the Supreme being and Creator God of the Serer pantheon. Roog is the source of life and everything returns to Roog. Roog is "the point of departure and conclusion, the origin and the end". The practitioners of the Serer traditional religion do not directly pray to Roog, choosing instead to pray through ancestral spirits known as Pangool, and as a result Roog has no place of worship. It is considered blasphemous to make images of Roog.

The Pangool, they are the spirits of our departed ancestors. Any mouth [person] who does not lie, does not harm, does not fornicate, does not take the property of others, that one, all he asks Roog will see his wishes granted by Roog. Roog Seen has no parent or friend. The individual does not evoke the name of God but him, he gives what he wants.

— Saltigue Geej Seen,

=== Gender ===
The Serer believe that Roog is an incorporeal and hermaphroditic being, possessing both a female and male nature. Depending on the situation, an individual may attempt to evoke its female or male side by using whichever pronoun is appropriate, although in scholarly works written in French and English the masculine pronoun is usually used. Saltigues refer to Roog as "father and mother" during their consecration rituals, while in the Serer creation myth it is both grandfather and grandmother, with the grandmother aspect giving birth to humanity.

== Bibliography ==
- Thiaw, Issa Laye, "La Religiosite de Seereer, Avant et pendant leur Islamisation", [in] Ethiopiques no: 54, Revue semestrielle de Culture Négro-Africaine, Nouvelle série, volume 7, 2e Semestre (1991) (Retrieved : 25 May 2012)
- Thiaw, Issa laye, "Mythe de la création du monde selon les sages sereer", pp 45–50, 59-61 [in] "Enracinement et Ouverture" - "Plaidoyer pour le dialogue interreligieux", Konrad Adenauer Stiftung (23 and 24 June 2009), Dakar (Retrieved : 25 May 2012)
- Ndiaye, Ousmane Sémou, "Diversité et unicité sérères : l’exemple de la région de Thiès", Éthiopiques, no. 54, vol. 7, 2e semestre 1991 (Retrieved : 25 May 2012)
- Faye, Louis Diène, "Mort et Naissance le monde Sereer", Les Nouvelles Editions Africaines (1983), ISBN 2-7236-0868-9
- Gravrand, Henry, "La Civilisation Sereer - Pangool", vol. 2. Les Nouvelles Editions Africaines du Senegal (1990), ISBN 2-7236-1055-1
- Gravrand, Henry, "Le Symbolisme sereer : Mythe du Saas et symboles", "Revue de Psycho-Pathologie" vol. 9 N^{o} 2 Dakar (1971) (Published and reviewed under the title "Le symbolisme serer"[in] Psychopath. Afric. 1973, IX, 2, 237-265 [in] Psychopathologie africaine) - (Link retrieved : 25 July 2012)
- Kellog, Day Otis, & Smith, William Robertson,"The Encyclopædia Britannica: latest edition. A dictionary of arts, sciences and general literature", Volume 25, Werner (1902)
- Madiya, Clémentine Faïk-Nzuji, "Canadian Museum of Civilization", Canadian Centre for Folk Culture Studies, "International Centre for African Language, Literature and Tradition", (Louvain, Belgium), ISBN 0-660-15965-1
- Kesteloot, Lilyan, "Introduction aux religions d'Afrique noire", s.n., 2007, p 50,
- Universität Frankfurt am Main, Frobenius-Institut, Deutsche Gesellschaft für Kulturmorphologie, Frobenius Gesellschaft, "Paideuma: Mitteilungen zur Kulturkunde, Volumes 43-44", F. Steiner (1997), pp 144–5, " Henry Gravrand,"La Civilisation Sereer - Pangool"[in]", ISBN 3515028420
