= Biffeche =

Area of Senegal

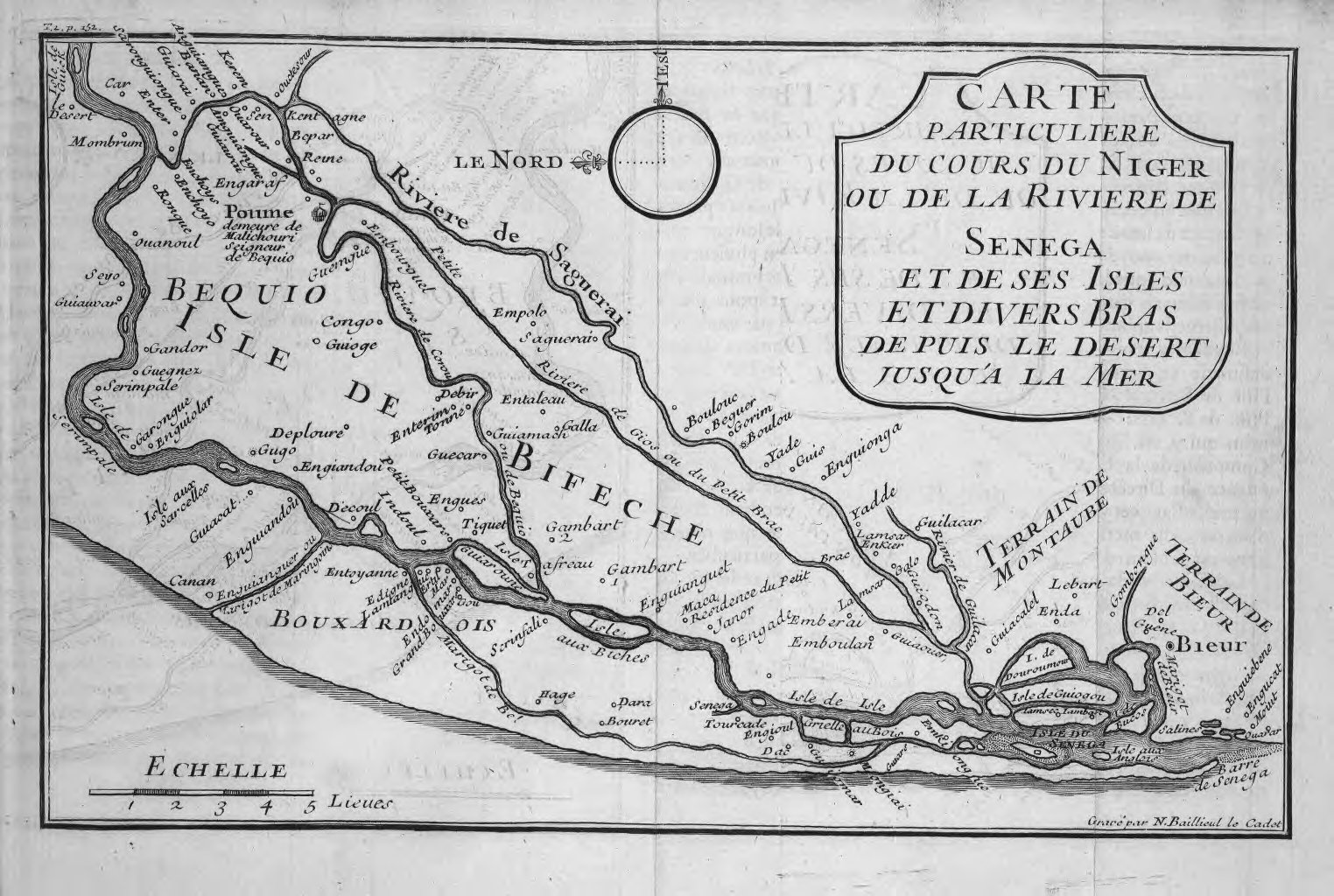
Biffeche.

Biffeche or Bifeche is an area of Senegal centred on the town of Savoigne, around 30 kilometres north-east of the major coastal city of Saint-Louis.

Low-lying and largely flat, the region is populated by Fula, (Note: In French: Peul or Peulh; in Fula: Fulɓe.), Serer-Ndut, Wolof and Moor ethnic groups. The inhabitants' primary economic activities include animal herding and irrigation-based farming. Savoigne is the region's largest town, twinned with La Ferté Macé; its SOCAS tomato-paste factory imports and dilutes tomato paste for re-shipment within Senegal. The population is primarily Muslim, but also contains Catholics and animists. The Djoudj National Bird Sanctuary is located to the north.

== History ==
The Serer-Ndut were the earliest known inhabitants of Biffeche. Strong adherents to their native Serer religion, they were persecuted and killed by the Muslims communities of Senegal, and suffered further persecution under French colonial rule.

Early European accounts described a medium-sized island (Isle de Bifeche) in the delta of the Senegal River, some two miles upstream from the island of N'Dar on which Saint-Louis was founded. The Penny Cyclopædia of the Society for the Diffusion of Useful Knowledge described the island in 1843 as being "entirely covered with wood, and in the wet season a great portion of them is laid under water."

In the 17th century a chief known as the Petit Brak or Little King ruled over a region known variously as Biffeche or Gangueul with its capital at Maka. The Grand Brak or Big King ruled the kingdom of Waalo, whose capital was originally at Ndiourbel on the north bank of the river. The area was nearly depopulated by repeated slaving raids by Moors from the north. At times, the Petit Brak was tributary to Waalo, at other times allied with Bethio. In the 1720s, the Brak of Waalo was Erim M'Bagnick and Béquio Malicouri, king of the Royaume d'Oral (Bethio), was his vassal.

== Historical maps ==
- Cours de la rivière de Sanaga ou Sénégal depuis son embouchure jusqu'à l'île de Bilbas / Suite du cours de la rivière de Sénégal depuis l'isle de Bilbas jusqu'au sault du Rocherde Govina / levé par un ingénieur francois, 1718. Online at BNF
- Carte de la rivière du Sénégal depuis la Barre jusqu'au Panier Foule des petites rivières et marigots qui en dérivent avec les noms des villages qui sont au bord, fait au Sénégal, 1720. Online at BNF
- Anville, Jean-Baptiste Bourguignon, Carte manuscrite de la côte d'Afrique aux environs de Gorée et de la rivière du Sénégal depuis Cagneux jusqu'à son embouchure. 1724. Online at BNF
