= Palor language =

Cangin language spoken in Senegal

Palor
- Palar
- Native to: Senegal
- Region: Thies
- Ethnicity: Serer-Palor
- Native speakers: 10,700 (2007)
- Language family: Niger–Congo?: Atlantic–Congo; Senegambian; Cangin; Palor–Ndut; Palor
- Dialects: Ba'ol; Kajor
- Writing system: Latin

Language codes
- ISO 639-3: fap
- Glottolog: palo1243
- ELP: Paloor

Palor (Falor, Paloor) is a language spoken in Senegal. The speakers of this language - the Palor people or Serer-Palor, are ethnically Serers but they do not speak the Serer-Sine language. Like the Lehar, Saafi, Noon and Ndut languages, their language is classified as one of the Cangin languages attached to the Niger–Congo family. Palor is closer to Ndut.

== Other names ==
Sili or Sili-Sili (the name for their language) and Waro (the name for themselves).
