= Ndut language =

Cangin language of Senegal

Ndut
- Native to: Senegal
- Region: Biffeche
- Ethnicity: Serer-Ndut
- Native speakers: 52,000 (2007)
- Language family: Niger–Congo?: Atlantic–Congo; Senegambian; Cangin; Palor–Ndut; Ndut

Language codes
- ISO 639-3: ndv
- Glottolog: ndut1239
- ELP: Ndut

Ndut (Ndoute) is a Cangin language of Senegal. Ethnologue reports that it is 84% cognate (and 55% intelligible) with Palor, essentially a divergent dialect, and 68% cognate with the other Cangin languages.
