= Louis Diène Faye =

- Born: 13 February 1936 (age 90); Joal, (Senegal)
- Occupations: Historian, author, theologian, essayist, songwriter, Member of the Council of BSDA (Dakar)
- Known for: History and religion
- Notable work: "Mort et Naissance, le monde sereer"

Louis Diène Faye (born 13 February 1936 at Joal) is a Senegalese anthropologist, author and scholar of Serer religion, history and culture. Himself of Serer heritage, he undertook his secondary schooling at Thiès (in Senegal) before proceeding to study religious sciences and audio-visual at the Catholic University of Lyon.

Faye has authored several books and scientific papers and quoted by many scholars who interacted with him. Some of his famous work include :

- "Mort et Naissance, le monde sereer", Le Nouvelles Editions Africaines (1983), ISBN 2-7236-0868-9
- "Éducation et mariage: le monde seereer" - tradition orale, Nouvelles Éditions africaines du Sénégal (2006), ISBN 2723614662

== Other fields ==
As well as his academic field, Faye is also songwriter and a producer-director at the O.R.T.S. He is a member of the Council d'administration du BSDA (Bureau Sénégalais du Droit d'Auteur), at Dakar.
