= Marguerite Dupire =

French ethnologist (1920–2015)

Marguerite Dupire (12 October 1920 – 4 March 2015) was a French ethnologist who specialised on African people, and worked extensively on the Fulani of Niger, Cameroon, Guinea, Senegal, and then after a mission in Ivory Coast, on the Serer people of Sine (in Senegal) since 1965.

== Biography ==
Dupire gained a degree in philosophy in 1943. She then completed her training by studying psychology and ethnology at the University of Paris, then in the United States, at the Northwestern University and the University of Pennsylvania, where she was the student of notable anthropologists such as Melville Herskovits and Alfred Irving Hallowell in the late 1940s.

== Publications ==
Marguerite Dupire has authored numerous scientific articles (see below).

Her principal works (in French) are :

- Peuls nomades: étude descriptive des Wodaabe du Sahel nigérien, Karthala, Paris, 1996 (1ère éd. 1962), 336 p. ISBN 2-86537-603-6
- Organisation sociale des Peul. Étude d'ethnographie comparée, Plon, Paris, 1970, 624 p.
- Sagesse sereer: essais sur la pensée sereer ndut, Karthala, Paris, 1994, 174 p. ISBN 2-86537-487-4
