= Cangin languages =

Group of Senegambian languages spoken in Senegal

Cangin
- Geographic distribution: Senegal, the Gambia
- Ethnicity: Serer
- Linguistic classification: Niger–Congo?: Atlantic–Congo; (Senegambian); Fula–Wolof?; Cangin
- Proto-language: Proto-Cangin
- Subdivisions: Saafi-Saafi; Lehar–Noon; Palor–Ndut

Language codes
- Glottolog: cang1245

The Cangin (/ˈtʃæŋɪn/) languages are spoken by 200,000 people (as of 2007) in a small area east of Dakar, Senegal. They are the languages spoken by the Serer people who do not speak the Serer language (Serer-Sine). Because the people are ethnically Serer, the Cangin languages are commonly thought to be dialects of the Serer language. However, they are not closely related; Serer is closer to Fulani than it is to Cangin.

== Languages ==
The Cangin languages are:

- - Safen, or Saafi-Saafi, the language of the Saafi people. Spoken inland from the Petite Côte, an area southeast of Dakar. The largest Cangin language, with over 100,000 speakers and growing (2007).
  - - Lehar (Laalaa), the language of the Serer-Laalaa (or Serer-Lehar), spoken in a small area north of Thiès.
    - Noon, the language of the Serer-Noon, spoken around Thiès.
- - Palor, the language of the Palor people, spoken in a small area between Rufisque and Thies.
  - Ndut, the language of the Serer-Ndut people, spoken in the Mont-Roland, an area northwest of Thies and in the Kingdom of Biffeche on the Senegal River.

Lehar and Noon are particularly close, as are Ndut and Palor, though not quite to the point of easy intelligibility. Safen is transparently closer to Lehar–Noon than to Palor–Ndut.

== Reconstruction ==
Merrill (2018: 451) reconstructs Proto-Cangin as follows.

gloss	Proto-Cangin	Noon	Lehar	Safen	Ndut	Palor
eye	*ɣi̟d/ɣad	has	kuu-koas	has	i̟l	’i̟l
tongue	*pe-ɗem	peɗim p-	pi̟ri̟m	peɗem	pereem	pereem
eat	*ñam	ñam	ñam	ñaam	ñam	ñam
breast	*ɓi̟iɓ	ɓi̟iɓ	ɓi̟iɓ	(w)ɓip	ɓi̟iɓ	ɓi̟iɓ
four	*nixiid	nikiis		nikis	iniil	iniil
dog	*ɓuh		ɓu̟u	ɓuh f-	ɓuh f-	ɓux f-
intestine	*loox	look	look	rook	loo	loo
wing	*paɓ	paɓ		paɓ	(d)pab	pap
cow	*-noɣ	enoh f-	enoh	’inoh	fana f-	fana’ f-
blow = nose	*ñii̟nd	ñii̟d-uk	ñii̟d-uk			ñii̟d~ñii̟n
pound	*hoɗ	oɗ	oɗ	’oɗ		xoɗ
jaw	*kaɓaɓ ?		kaaɓ ‘cheek’	kaɓaɓ k-		kabaap
new	*has	as	as	’as	has	xas
see	*ɣot	hot	hot	hot	ot~ol-	od~ol-
swallow	*hon	on	on	’on	(d)hon	xon
bury	*hac	ac	ac	’ac	hac	xac
bear child	*li̟m	li̟m	li̟m	(w)rim		li̟m
dance	*ɣam	ham	ham			
hold in teeth	*ŋaɓ	ŋaaɓ	ŋaɓ	ŋaɓ	ŋaɓ	
year	*kV-(h)id̟	kii̟s k-	kii̟s	kiis k-	kii̟l	kii̟l
tree	*ki-rik	kedik k-	kedek	kiɗig k-	kilik	kilik k-
bird	*sel	sel	sel	sel		
bury	*hu̟umb	u̟ub~u̟um		uumb		
be able	*mi̟n	mi̟n		min	mi̟n	min
resemble	*mand	mad~man	man		mad~man	mad~man
be short	*luH-	looƴ (lohoƴ)	looƴ	(s)rohoƴ	(d)luh	lux
leaf/bark	*huɓ	to̟oɓ t-, oɓ	po̟o	(w)’op	huɓ	
sun	*noɣ	noh	noh	noh	(d)na’	na’
ear	*nuf	nof	nof	(w)noef	nuf	nuf
head	*ɣaf	haf	haf	haf	’af	’af
liver	*keeñ	keeñ	keeñ	keeñ k-	(d)keeñ	
star	*Hul	hol	ol	hor	hul	xul
rain	*toɓ	toɓ	toɓ	toɓ	tooɓ	
pestle	*kuɗ	koɗ k-	koɗ		kuɗ k-	kuɗ k-
goat	*pe	pe’ f-	peɗ	peh f-	pe f-	pe f-
cloth/rag	*lii̟l	lii̟l	lii̟l		lii̟l	lii̟l
baobab	*ɓoɣ	ɓoh	ɓoh	ɓoh	ɓa	ɓa’
finger	*kun	jokun j-	jokon	ndukun	kun	kun
sneeze	*ti̟s	tes	ti̟s	(s)tisoh	(d)ti̟s	ti̟s
ant	*ñii̟ñ	ñii̟ñ	ñii̟ñ	ñiñoh f-	(d)ñii̟ñ f-	ñii̟n f-
rear/raise	*koɗ	koɗ		koɗ	koɗ	kod
honey	*kV-(C)u̟m	ku̟um k-	ku̟um		(d)ku̟um k-	ku̟um k-
horse	*panis̟	pen̟is̟ f-	pan̟is̟	panis	pan̟is̟ f-	
causative	*-iɗ̟	-iɗ̟	-iɗ̟	-iɗ	-iɗ̟	-iɗ̟
anticausative	*-ox	-uk	-ok	-uk	-oh	-ox
reversive	*-i̟s	-i̟s	-i̟s	-is	-i̟s	-i̟s
negative	*-ɗii	-ɗii		-ɗi		

== See also ==
- Serer language
- List of Proto-Cangin reconstructions (Wiktionary)
