= Issa Laye Thiaw =

Senegalese historian (1943–2017)

- Born: 1943; Sangué, Thies region, French Senegal
- Died: 10 September 2017 (aged 73–74)
- Occupations: Historian; theologian; author; essayist
- Known for: Serer religion
- Notable work: La femme Seereer; "La religiosité Seereer, avant et pendant leur Islamisation"

Issa Laye Thiaw (1943 – 10 September 2017) was a Senegalese historian, theologian and author on Serer religion, Serer tradition and history. Born into a Serer family, himself the son of a Serer High Priest (Saltigue), Thiaw is a specialist in the Serer religion. He was a former researcher at the Centre d’études des civilisations (CEC; Centre for Studies in Civilizations) of Dakar.

Some of Thiaw's works include:

- Issa Laye Thiaw. La femme Seereer, Sénégal, 2005, Sociétés africaines et diaspora. Edition L'harmattan, ISBN 2-7475-8907-2
- Issa Laye Thiaw. "La religiosité Seereer, avant et pendant leur Islamisation." In: Ethiopiques, No. 55 (1992)

== See also ==
- Serer people
- Serer religion
- List of Senegalese writers
