= Timeline of Serer history =

This is a timeline of the history and development of Serer religion and the Serer people of Senegal, The Gambia and Mauritania. This timeline merely gives an overview of their history, consisting of calibrated archaeological discoveries in Serer countries, Serer religion, politics, royalty, etc. Dates are given according to the Common Era. For a background to these events, see Roog, Serer religion, Serer creation myth, Serer prehistory, Lamane, States headed by Serer Lamanes, Serer history and Serer people.

== Prehistory ==
- The Takrur period represents the prehistory of the Serer people. The Senegalese, Namandiru and Waalo period inaugurates Serer history.

== Medieval era (The Golden Age of West Africa) ==
=== 9th century ===
- 800 AD: John Trimingham lists states on the Senegal:"800 States on the Senegal: Sanghana (Serer), Takrur, Silla, and Galam (Soninke)."

Many of the Serer village and town names they have founded still survives today.

- 850 AD: A state centered around Takrur may have developed at this time, either as an influx of Fulani from the east settled in the Senegal valley. or according to John Donnelly Fage formed through the interaction of Berbers from the Sahara and "Negro agricultural peoples" who were "essentially Serer".

=== 11th century ===
"Today, the Serer retain much of their old culture, customs and traditions. In fact, it's not uncommon to hear how Serer culture has survived through the centuries in spite of all the forces which tried to destroy it."

— Godfrey Mwakikagile,
- Early 11th century: According to Serer tradition Lamane Jegan Joof founded Tukar (part of present-day Senegal).
- 1030: War Jabi usurped the throne of Takrur following a revolution and made himself King of Takrur.
- 1035: Around this time, War Jabi the revolutionist converted to Islam and introduced forced conversion of his subjects as well as Sharia law with the guidance of his Almoravid allies, Abdallah ibn Yasin in particular. Much of his religious persecution was directed at the Serer people who refused to submit to Islam as well as the Serer Lamanic class, the guardians of Serer religion and holders of economic and political power (see Persecution of the Serers). From this point to 1042, the Serers of Takrur became the subject of persecution and jihads by the African converts to Islam such as the Fula and Toucouleurs with their Almoravid allies. Despite their strong resistance, the Serers were eventually defeated by the powerful Muslim coalition forces of the Almoravids.

This era marks the exodus of the Serers of Takrur. Those who survived the wars and refused to convert migrated southwards to what later became known as the Serer Kingdoms of Sine, Saloum and previously Baol, rather than convert to Islam. In the south, they were granted asylum by their distant Serer relatives, endorsed by the Great Council of Lamanes, the highest court in Serer country. Trimingham notes that, Takrur was the first in the region to adopt Islam but lost completely its Serer identity. War Jabi died in 1040 and was succeeded by his son Leb (or Labi), also a major ally of the Almoravids. Leb is reported to have been fighting for the Almoravids in 1056 probably as a result of the subjugation of Takrur by the Almoravids in 1042 and a well enforced Sharia law.

=== 13th century ===
- c. 1235 : Mansa Jolofing (the Serer king of Jolof) ransacked the caravan of gold sent by Sundiata Keita for the purchase of horses in Jolof. After this, Mansa Sundiata sent his general and cousin Tiramakhan Traore to Jolof to assassinate the Mansa Jolofing.
- c. 1285/7: Lamane Jaw on the throne of Jolof. During his reign, Mansa Sakoura (the Mansa of Imperial Mali) launched an expedition in Senegal (c. 1285), conquered Jolof and reduced Lamane Jaw to a mere provincial chief.
- c. 1290: Maad Ndaah Njemeh Joof, ancestor of the Joof dynasty of Sine and Saloum succeeded to the throne of Laah in Baol.

=== 14th century ===
- 1350–1400: The Kingdom of Sine renamed. The Guelowar period starts from 1350. Maad a Sinig Maysa Wali Jaxateh Manneh elected first Guelowar king to ever rule in one of the Serer countries (Kingdom of Sine). Nominated and elected by the Serers of Sine and the Great Council of Lamanes whose Council he served as legal adviser for 15 years and gave his sisters and nieces to in marriage. Maysa Wali ruled in 1350–1370. The marriages between the descendants of the ancient Serer Lamanic class and the Guelowar women created the Serer paternal dynasties and the Guelowar maternal dynasty which lasted for over 600 years. Some members of the Serer nobility were opposed to the nomination and election of Maysa Wali, in particular Lamane Pangha Yaya Sarr (many variations: Penga Yaye Sarr, etc.), because Maysa Wali did not have a Serer father nor a Serer mother in spite of his assimilation into Serer culture, long service to the Great Council and coming from royalty himself. None of Maad a Sinig Maysa Wali's descendants ruled in any of the Serer kingdoms after him. The children and descendants of the Serer men and Guelowar women became Serers with loyalty to Serer religion, the Serer people, the Serer countries, culture and language, and all ties with Kaabu were severed. In this period, the old Serer paternal dynasties survived but the old Wagadou maternal dynasty collapsed in Sine and later Saloum, except in Baol and other places. The Guelowar period is the last of Serer dynastic periodization
- 1360 : Oral tradition reports that Ndiadiane Ndiaye (also called Bourba Jolof Njajaan Njie) founded the Jolof Empire, an empire founded by a voluntary confederation of states. John Donnelly Fage suggests although dates in the early 13th century (and others say 12th century) are usually ascribed to this king and the founding of the empire, a more likely scenario is "that the rise of the empire was associated with the growth of Wolof power at the expense of the ancient Sudanese state of Takrur, and that this was essentially a fourteenth-century development." Maad a Sinig Maysa Wali was said to be instrumental in the founding of this empire, nominating Njajaan Njie to lead the Jolof Empire and called for the other states join this confederacy under Njajaan which they did according to the epics of Njajaan and Maysa Wali. The Maad a Sinig thus took the Kingdom of Sine to this confederacy. Though the establishment of this empire was voluntary, its disestablishment was not, resulting in the Battle of Danki in 1549. This era marks the deterioration of the Mali Empire as it began to loose some of its former vassal states. Although it did not collapse completely, Imperial Mali was not as powerful as it once was.

=== 15th century ===
- 1446: The Portuguese slave trader Nuno Tristão and his party attempted a slave raiding expedition in Serer territory. They all succumbed to Serer poisoned arrows except five young Portuguese (or less). One of them was left to charter their caravel back to Portugal. Nuno was amongst those killed.
- 1455: the Venetian slave trader and chronicler Alvise Cadamosto having bought Wolof slaves in Cayor, decided to stop his ship at the Serer community living on the border of Wolof Cayor. Alvise wrote how these Serer community looked menacing and unwelcoming. He then went on to say that, after seeing their ship approaching, this Serer community stood guard at the beach. The captain of the ship gave the order for no one to come off the ship and the ship was parked further away from the beach. Alvise Cadamosto sent his Wolof interpreter to go and negotiate slave terms with this Serer community whilst he (Alvise) and his Portuguese party remained in the ship. The Wolof interpreter was killed on the spot by these Serers for bringing slave traders into their territory. None of Alvise's party came off, instead, the ship departed and headed towards the Gambia. Alvise also corrupted the Kingdom of Sine by calling it the Kingdom of Barbaçim and the Serer people of Sine as Barbacins among other names which many Europeans of this era referred to the Serer people as in their old maps (See: Kingdom of Sine).
- 1493: Maad Saloum Mbegan Ndour, King of Saloum succeeded to the throne.

=== 16th century ===
- 1549: The Battle of Danki, Amary Ngoneh Sobel Faal assisted by his first cousin Prince Manguinak Joof (var : Manguinak Diouf, a member of the old Joof dynasty of Baol), both nephews of Teigne Njuko Njie (the last member of the Serer paternal dynasty to rule Baol), defeated the King of Jolof Lele Fuuli Faak Njie and disestablished the Jolof Empire. Lele Fuuli was killed at Danki. Amari Ngoneh united the old Baol and Cayor temporarily, Manguinak Joof was honoured with the title Ber Jak of Cayor (equivalent of Prime Minister). With the disestablishment of the Jolof Empire, member States of the confederacy such as the Kingdom of Sine, Kingdom of Saloum, Waalo, Baol, etc., returned to independent States. The Faal family are not Serers. The Njie (or Ndiaye) and Joof family are.
- 1567: Maad Saloum Malawtan Joof, the longest reigning King of Saloum (45 years on the throne) succeeded to the throne.

== Early modern period ==
=== 17th century ===
- 1678: The Serers of Sine and Baol refused to welcome the French merchants who have settled on the Petite Côte and thus lodge a complaint to their respective kings (the Maad a Sinig (king of Sine) and the Teigne (king of Baol). That year, the king of Sine and Baol with their armies sacked the French post. The following year, Admiral du Casse launched a revenge attack and defeated them.

=== 18th century ===
- c. 1717: Founding of The Royal House of Semou Njekeh Joof by Maad Semou Njekeh Joof. The third and last royal house founded by the Joof family.
- c. 1724 – 1735: Maad a Sinig Boukar Tjilas Sanghaie Joof son of Maad Semou Njekeh Joof, ruled the Kingdom of Sine.

== Modern history ==
=== 19th century ===
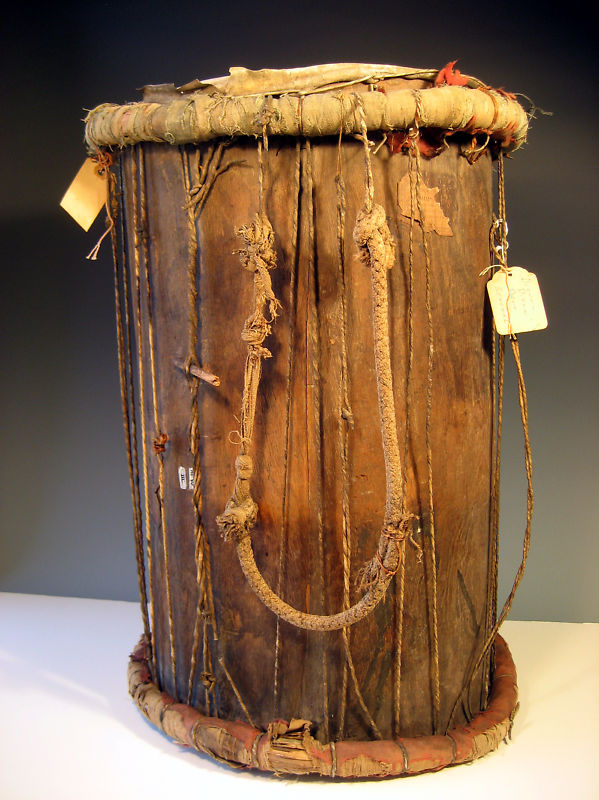
19th century war drum called junjung in Serer language. Played when Serer kings and warriors went to war. From the Kingdom of Sine.

- 1816: The British named the Gambian city Bathurst (now Banjul) after Lord Bathurst of Britain.
- 1848: El Hadj Umar Tall (the 19th century jihadist) in addressing his disciples, told them :

"The noble qualities are found in Serer countries, though they only lack Islam..."

- 1851: Death of the Serer warlord Sandigue Ndiob Niokhobai Joof (father of King Ama Joof Gnilane Faye Joof, of Sine)
- 1853: Maad a Sinig Ama Joof Gnilane Faye Joof, the most controversial king of Sine died.
  - Maad a Sinig Kumba Ndoffene Famak Joof succeeded Maad Ama Joof as King of Sine.
    - 1853–1871: The national anthem, moto and flag of Sine officiated during the reign of Maad Kumba Ndoffene Famak Joof.

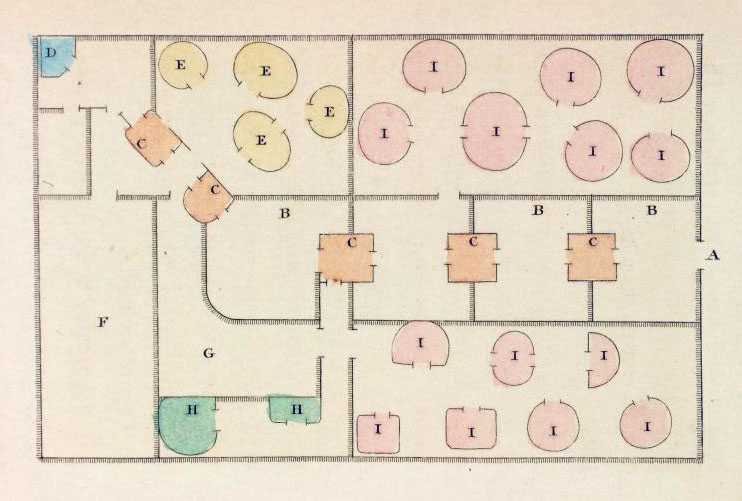
Plan of the Maad a Sinig's residence in Joal.

- 1857: Maad a Sinig Kumba Ndoffene Famak Joof (the King of Sine) granted Teigne Chai Yassin Faal (var: Thiés Yacine Fall, King of Baol) asylum after he was defeated and exiled by the French at the Battle of Pouri.
- 18 May 1859: Battle of Logandème, Louis Faidherbe, the French governor of Senegal defeated the Serer people of Sine and Maad a Sinig Kumba Ndoffene Famak Joof at Logandème.
- 1859–1865: Faidherbe made Cayor and Baol (the former Serer State) protectorates.
  - The Battle of Nandjigui (1859): The King of Saloum – Maad Saloum Kumba Ndama Mbodj (var: Coumba Ndama) killed by the Muslim Marabout forces in a jihadic expedition in Saloum. The jihad led by Maba Diakhou Bâ.
- 1861: The great Jogomay Tine of Gorom was displeased when Damel Majojo Faal (the French-backed puppet king of Cayor) conceded his province to the French governor – Louis Faidherbe. Damel-Teigne Lat Jorr Ngoneh Latir Jobe who had now form good relations with the French was invited by the French to occupy the region including Jogomay Tine's province. Majojo was declared too incompetent by the French. Jogomay Tine refused to submit to neither Lat Jorr nor the French, and refused to authorise the Serer population of his province to part take in the 1863 census. In April 1863, governor Émile Pinet-Laprade of France authorized the French forces to enter his province. He was killed by the gun shot.
  - Disgruntled members of the Muslim jihadic movement (the Marabouts) such as Sambou Oumanneh Touray, assisted by Cheikhou Jobe and Manjie Khoreja led a jihad in Sabakh and Sanjal and killed the last Farank Sabakh and Farank Sanjal. Sambou annexed both States and called it Sabakh-Sanjal. After the Muslims' victory in these two States, they launched jihad in Ngaye (c.1861) and in Kaymor (c. 1863) and killed the Buumi Ngaye, Biriama Jogop who refused to submit to Islam. Waly Nyang, the griot and advisor to the Buumi, beat his tam-tam and called for martyrdom in accordance with the Serer principle of Jom rather than succumbing to Islam. Jom in Serer means "honour". The Serer religion permits suicide only if it satisfies the Jom principle (see: Serer religion).Maba Diakhou Bâ, leader of the Muslim marabouts was not involved in the attack of Kaymor. The attack on Kaymor was done by the disgruntled three without his authority. but was involved in the attack at Ngaye.
- 1862: The Battle of Tchicat, Maba Diakhou Bâ launched jihad in the Serer Kingdom of Saloum at Tchicat against Maad Saloum Samba Laobe Latsouka Sira Jogop Faal. That same year, he launched jihad against the kingdom of Baol.
  - 6 October 1862: At the Battle of Gouye Ndiouli, the King of Saloum – Samba Laobe Latsouka Sira Jogop Faal (son of Princess Latsouka Sira Jogop Mbodj of Saloum) – had to battle his own father Ma Kodu Joof Faal the King of Cayor, who previously rejected the throne of Saloum in favour of Cayor until he was defeated and driven out of Cayor by the French. When he tried to reclaim the throne of Saloum after his defeat, the Great Jaraff and his Noble Council refused to crown him king of Saloum. The young king of Saloum (Samba Laobe) defeated his father, paternal uncle and their armies, and drove them out of Saloum.
- July 1863: The Serers massacred the French soldiers at the garrison of Pout. The French sergeant barely escaped with his life. Pinet Laprade (the French governor in Senegal) within few days exercised reprisals for the massacres and built the first fort in Thiès.
- c. 12 January 1864: Maad a Sinig Kumba Ndoffene Famak Joof (King of Sine) granted asylum to Lat Jorr Ngoneh Latir Jobe (King of Cayor) after he was defeated and exiled by the French governor in Senegal (Émile Pinet-Laprade). According to Serer oral tradition, Lat Jorr was well received in Sine just as El Hadj Umar Tall was well received when he visited Sine. However, Lat Jorr they say betrayed the Kingdom of Sine when he sided with Maba Diakhou Ba at "The Surprise of Mbin o Ngor" and at The Battle of Fandane-Thiouthioune.
- 1867: The surprise of Mbin o Ngor – the Muslims surprised the Serer people of Mbin o Ngor, a small village in the Kingdom of Sine.
- 18 July 1867: The Battle of Fandane-Thiouthioune (also known as the Battle of Somb), Maad a Sinig Kumba Ndoffene Famak Joof (King of Sine) defeated the Muslim marabouts and Maba Diakhou Bâ the renowned jihadist was killed and dismembered.
- 1881–1914 (World War I): The Scramble for Africa. the European imperial powers divide Africa. The Serer countries affected and the old open borders ceased to exist.
- July 1890: The sacred stone of Mpal (also known as "the Stone of Mame Kantar") was built and worshipped by the local Serer population as well as the Lebou people for many generation, destroyed by Limamou and his Muslim disciples.

=== 20th century ===
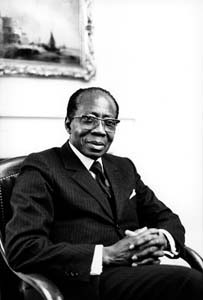
Léopold Sédar Senghor, the first president of Senegal

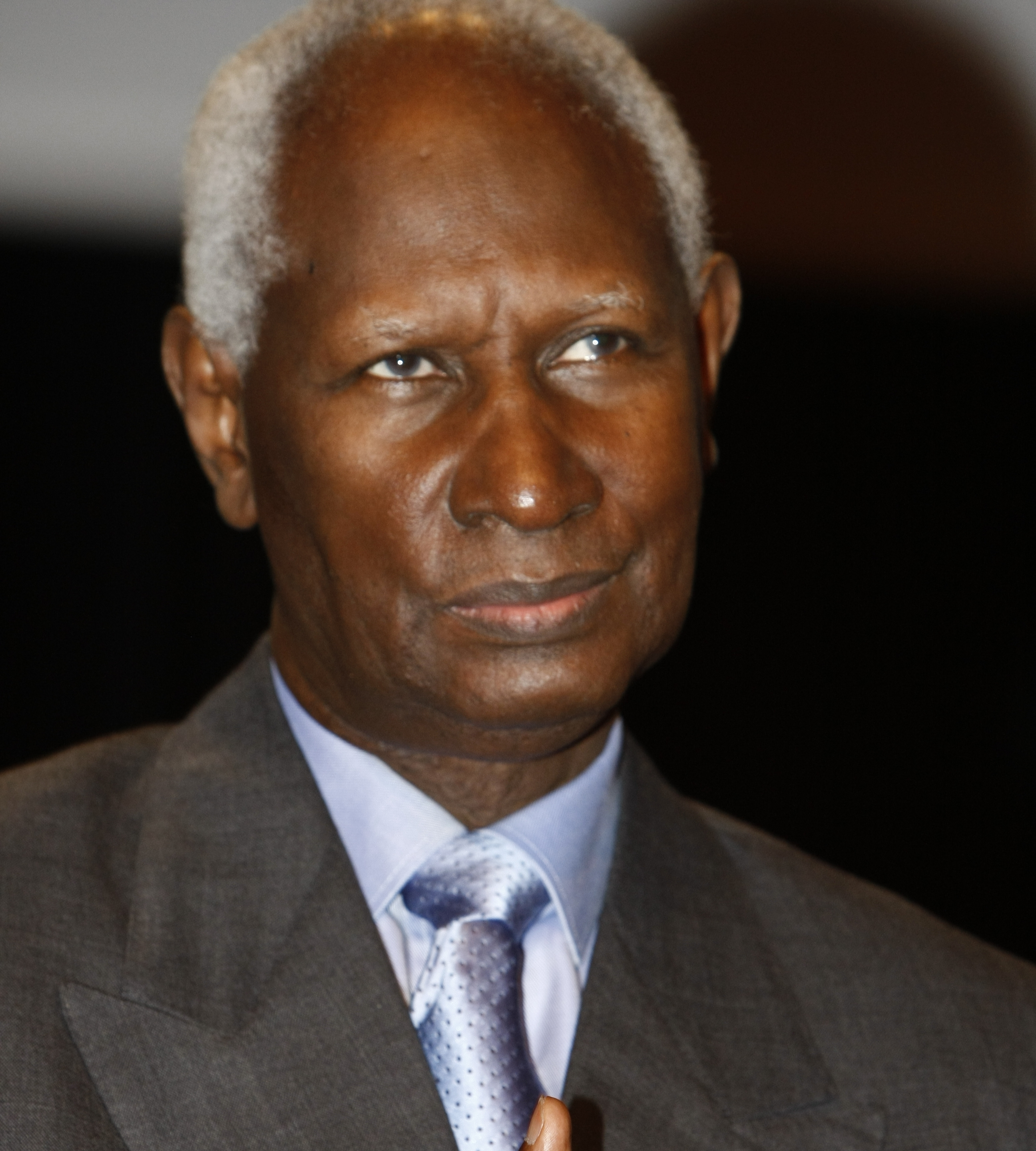
and Abdou Diouf, the second president of Senegal. Both of Serer heritage.

- c. 1905 / 1906: The French assisted the Wolofs against the Serers at the Battle of Diobas. The Wolofs were victorious.
- 1909: At Rufisque, Galandou Diouf became the first African to be elected official during the colonial period.
- 28 January 1924: The last king of Sine Maad a Sinig Mahecor Joof succeeded to the throne.
- 1929: Emergence of négritude. In Senegal, led by Léopold Sédar Senghor.
- c. 1930: Alioune Sarr, the historian and author developed his famous work "Histoire du Sine-Saloum". A work that has become one of the benchmarks of Serer medieval history.
- 1934: Death of Blaise Diagne and the election of Galandou Diouf at the Assemblée nationale française
  - The last king of Saloum Maad Saloum Fode N'Gouye Joof succeeded to the throne.
- 1938: First strikes of railway workers in Thiès.
  - French colonial authorities respond to the railway strikes by carrying out the Thiès massacre.
  - Creation of the Institut Fondamental d'Afrique Noire (IFAN) at Dakar. Although founded under the premise of civilising, it did provide the Serer intelligentsia like Léopold Sédar Senghor, etc., as well as other Senegalese groups with the platform to showcase their work.
- 1939–1945: World War II, the French recruited many Senegalese and the British conscripted many Gambians. Many Serers and Africans fought and died in this war to defeat the Nazis.
- 1940: Whilst fighting for France in the 2nd World War, the future president of Senegal Léopold Sédar Senghor was captured by the Nazis and imprisoned for two years when they invaded France.
- 1946: Alliance between Lamine Guèye and Léopold Sédar Senghor.
- October 1947 – March 1948: Strike of railway workers in Thiès
  - Extension of the Afrique occidentale française
- 1948: Political split of Léopold Sédar Senghor and Lamine Guèye and the foundation of Bloc démocratique sénégalais (BDS)
- 1958: Dissolution of the Afrique occidentale française (AOF)
- 1959: Alhaji Alieu Ebrima Cham Joof the Gambian historian, author, nationalist and politician organized and led the Bread and Butter Demonstration in the Gambia against British colonialism.
- 4 April 1960: Independence of Senegal from colonial France.
- 6 September 1960: Léopold Sédar Senghor became the first president of Senegal.
- 1 May 1963: Alhaji Alieu Ebrima Cham Joof, the Gambia's leading nationalist and Pan-Africanist in the colonial-era delivered a speech in the first ever conference of the Organization of African Unity held at Addis Ababa. In addressing the Member States, Cham Joof told them to endeavour their utmost to eradicate colonialism and neo-colonialism from Africa and ultimately from the world.
- 18 February 1965: The Gambia gained its independence from colonial Britain.
- 31 December 1980: Léopold Sédar Senghor left office as president of Senegal.
- 1 January 1981: Abdou Diouf succeeded Léopold Sédar Senghor as the second president of Senegal.
- 1986: President Abdou Diouf's anti-AIDS program resulted in Senegal having one of the lowest HIV-AIDS infections in Africa.
- 1989: Ibrahima Moctar Sarr, the Mauritanian journalist, politician and co-founder of African Liberation Forces of Mauritania, released from prison after his imprisonment for defending the civil rights of the Black people of Mauritania.
- 16 December 1991: Pap Saine, the Gambian publisher and editor, co-founded The Point Newspaper with Deyda Hydara and Babucarr Gaye.

=== 21st century ===
- 1 April 2000: President Abdou Diouf, like his predecessor Léopold Sédar Senghor, peacefully and democratically handed over power after he was defeated in Senegal's 2000 General Elections.
- 6 May 2001: Death of Judge Laity Kama, the first president of the International Criminal Tribunal for Rwanda. He was also one of the longest-serving judges of that Tribunal.
- 20 December 2001: Death of Léopold Sédar Senghor.
- 2 February 2009: Pap Saine arrested by Gambian police for suspicion of "publishing and spreading false information", followed by a series of further arrests and false charges.
- 2010: Pap Saine, the Gambian publisher of The Point Newspaper awarded the World Press Freedom Hero by the International Press Institute for his work on freedom of the press.
- 2 April 2011: Death of Alhaji Alieu Ebrima Cham Joof.

== See also ==
- Roog
- Saltigue
- Senegambian stone circles
- Cekeen Tumulus
- History of Senegal
- History of the Gambia
- History of Mali
- Adrar Plateau
- Adrar Region
- Tichit
- List of years in Senegal
- Timeline of Senegal
- Years in Mauritania

== Notes ==
=== Bibliography ===
- Gravrand, Henry, "La Civilisation Sereer – Pangool", vol.2, Les Nouvelles Editions Africaines du Senegal, 1990, ISBN 2-7236-1055-1
- Gravrand, Henry, "La civilisation Sereer, VOL.1, Cosaan : les origines", Nouvelles Editions africaines, 1983, ISBN 2723608778
- Gravrand, Henry, "L’HERITAGE SPIRITUEL SEREER : VALEUR TRADITIONNELLE D’HIER, D’AUJOURD’HUI ET DE DEMAIN" [in] Ethiopiques, numéro 31, révue socialiste de culture négro-africaine, 3e trimestre 1982
- Human Evolution by The Smithsonian Institution's Human Origins Program
- Goodman M, Tagle D, Fitch D, Bailey W, Czelusniak J, Koop B, Benson P, Slightom J (1990). "Primate evolution at the DNA level and a classification of hominoids". J Mol Evol 30 (3): pp 260–266
- Descamps, Cyr, "Contribution a la Préhistoire de l'Ouest-sénégalais", thèse, Paris, p 315. (inédit: p 126)
- Diouf, Mahawa, "L’INFORMATION HISTORIQUE : L’EXEMPLE DU SIIN", Ethiopiques n°54. Revue semestrielle de culture négro-Africaine. Nouvelle série volume 7. 2e semestre 1991
- Descamps, Cyr, "Quelques réflexions sur le Néolithique du Sénégal", vol. 1, pp 145–151, West African Journal of Archaeology (1981)
- Dagan, Th., Le Site préhistorique de Tiémassas (Sénégal), pp 432–438, Bulletin de l'Institut Français d'Afrique Noire (1956)
- McMahon, Robin,"On the Origin of Diversity", Filament Publishing Ltd, 2011, ISBN 1905493878
- UNESCO, General history of Africa, vol.1, Methodology and African Prehistory, (UNESCO International Scientific Committee for the Drafting of a General History of Africa), Heinemann Publishers, University of California Press, UNESCO, 1981, ISBN 0-435-94807-5 (cased)
- Clémentine Faïk-Nzuji Madiya, Canadian Museum of Civilization, "Tracing memory: a glossary of graphic signs and symbols in African art and culture", Canadian Centre for Folk Culture Studies, International Centre for African Language, Literature and Tradition (Louvain, Belgium). ISBN 0-660-15965-1. pp 27, 115
- Rake, Alan, New African yearbook, Volumes 1999–2000, Africa Book Centre Limited, 2000, ISBN 0905268636
- Rigby, Leonard D. Katz, Evolutionary Origins of Morality : Cross-disciplinary Perspectives, Imprint Academic, ISBN 0719056128
- Sarr, Alioune, "Histoire du Sine-Saloum", Introduction, bibliographie et notes par Charles Becker, BIFAN, Tome 46, Serie B, n° 3–4, 1986–1987
- Diouf, Niokhobaye, "Chronique du royaume du Sine" par suivie de Notes sur les traditions orales et les sources écrites concernant le royaume du Sine par Charles Becker et Victor Martin. Bulletin de l'Ifan, Tome 34, Série B, n° 4, 1972
- Diamond, Jared (1999). Guns, Germs, and Steel. New York: Norton Press. ISBN 0-393-31755-2.
- A. Secka, I. Sow and M. Niass. Collaborators: A.D. Ndoye, T. Kante, A. Thiam, P. Faye and T. Ndiaye. Senegal, "Horticonsult, The biodiversity of traditional leafy vegetables"
- Mwakikagile, Godfrey, The Gambia and Its People: Ethnic Identities and Cultural Integration in Africa (2010), ISBN 9987-16-023-9
- Mwakikagile, Godfrey, Ethnic Diversity and Integration in The Gambia: The Land, The People and The Culture, (2010), ISBN 9987932223
- University of Calgary. Dept. of Archaeology, Society of Africanist Archaeologists in America, Society of Africanist Archaeologists, Newsletter of African archaeology, Issues 47-50", Dept. of Archaeology, University of Calgary, 1997
- Becker, Charles: Vestiges historiques, trémoins matériels du passé clans les pays sereer. Dakar. 1993. CNRS – ORS TO M
- Foltz, William J., From French West Africa to the Mali Federation, vol. 12 of Yale studies in political science", p 136, Yale University Press, (1965)
- Chavane, Bruno A., Villages de l’ancien Tekrour, Vol.2. Hommes et sociétés. Archéologies africaines, KARTHALA Editions, 1985, ISBN 2865371433
- Laude, Jean, The Arts of Black Africa, University of California Press, 1973 (translated by Jean Decock), ISBN 0520023587
- Ben-Jochannan, Yosef, Black Man of the Nile and His Family, ed. 2, Black Classic Press, 1972, ISBN 0933121261
- Ajayi, J. F. Ade, Crowder, Michael, History of West Africa, Volume 1, Longman, 1985, ISBN 0582646839
- African Studies Association, History in Africa, Volume 11, African Studies Association., 1984, the University of Michigan
- Monteil, Charles, "Fin de siècle à Médine" (1898–1899), Bulletin de l'lFAN, vol. 28, série B, n° 1–2, 1966,
- Monteil, Charles, "La légende officielle de Soundiata, fondateur de l'empire manding", Bulletin du Comité d 'Etudes historiques et scientifiques de l 'AOF, tome VIII, n° 2, 1924;
- Cornevin, Robert, Histoire de l'Afrique, Tome I : des origines au XVIe siècle (Paris, 1962)
- Crowder, Michael, West Africa: an introduction to its history;, Longman, 1977,
- Delafosse, Maurice, Haut-Sénégal-Niger: Le Pays, les Peuples, les Langues"; "l'Histoire"; "les Civilizations". vols. 1–3, Paris: Émile Larose (1912), (editors: Marie François Joseph Clozel)
- Monteil, Charles, "Mélanges ethnologiques", Memoires de IFAN (Dakar), 1953, no. 23
- Phillips, Lucie Colvin, Historical dictionary of Senegal, Scarecrow Press, 1981, ISBN 0-8108-1369-6
- Institut Fondamental d'Afrique Noire. Bulletin de l'Institut fondamental d'Afrique noire, Volume 38. IFAN, 1976
- Clark, Andrew F. & Philips, Lucie Colvin, Historical Dictionary of Senegal, Second Edition (1994)
- Trimingham, John Spencer, A history of Islam in West Africa, Oxford University Press, USA, 1970
- Gamble, David P., & Salmon, Linda K. (with Alhaji Hassan Njie), Gambian Studies No. 17. "People of The Gambia. I. The Wolof.with notes on the Serer and the Lebou", San Francisco 1985
- Stride, G. T., Ifeka, Caroline, Peoples and empires of West Africa: West Africa in history, 1000-1800, Africana Pub. Corp (1971)
- Houtsma, M. Th., L-Moriscos, (editor: M. Th. Houtsma), BRILL, 1993, ISBN 9004097910
- Page, Willie F., Encyclopedia of African history and culture: African kingdoms (500 to 1500), Vol.2, Facts on File (2001), ISBN 0-8160-4472-4
- Niane, Djibril Tamsir, General History of Africa: Africa from the twelfth to the sixteenth century, UNESCO, 1984, ISBN 9231017101
- Niane, Djibril Tamsir, Histoire des Mandingues de l'Ouest: le royaume du Gabou, KARTHALA Editions, 1989, ISBN 2865372367
- Abdur Rahman I. Doi, Islam in Nigeria, Gaskiya Corp., 1984, p 9
- Bulletin de l'Institut fondamental d'Afrique noire, vol. 26–27, 1964
- Nnoli, Okwudiba, Ethnic conflicts in Africa, CODESRIA, 1998. ISBN 2-86978-070-2
- La famille Juuf [in] « L'épopée de Sanmoon Fay », in Éthiopiques, no 54, vol. 7, 2e semestre
- Ngom, Biram (Babacar Sédikh Diouf), "La question Gelwaar et l’histoire du Siin", Université de Dakar, Dakar, 1987
- Charles, Eunice A., Precolonial Senegal: the Jolof Kingdom, 1800–1890, African Studies Center, Boston University, 1977
- Conrad, David C., Empires of Medieval West Africa, Infobase Publishing, 2005, ISBN 1-4381-0319-0
- Hair, Paul Edward Hedley, Africa encountered: European contacts and evidence, 1450–1700, Variorum, 1997 ISBN 0-86078-626-9
- Boulègue, Jean, Le Grand Jolof, (XVIIIe – XVIe Siècle), (Paris, Edition Façades), Karthala (1987)
- Kerr, Robert, A general history of voyages and travels to the end of the 18th century, pp238–240, J. Ballantyne & Co. 1811;
- Verrier, Frédérique, Introduction. Voyages en Afrique noire d'Alvise Ca'da Mosto (1455 & 1456), p 136, Chandeigne, Paris, 1994
- Russell, Peter E., Prince Henry 'the Navigator' : a life, New Haven, Conn: Yale University Press, 2000, pp 299–300
- Ba, Abdou Bouri, "Essai sur l’histoire du Saloum et du Rip". Avant-propos par Charles Becker et Victor Martin. Publié dans le Bulletin de l’Institut Fondamental d’Afrique Noire, pp 10–27
- Fall, Tanor Latsoukabé, "Recueil sur la Vie des Damel", Introduit et commenté par Charles Becker et Victor. Martin, BIFAN, Tome 36, Série B, n° 1, janvier 1974
- Ndiaye, Ousmane Sémou, "Diversité et unicité Sérères: L'exemple de la Région de Thiès", Ethiopiques, n°54, revue semestrielle de culture négro-africaine, Nouvelle série volume 7, 2e semestre 1991
- Klein, Martin A. Islam and Imperialism in Senegal Sine-Saloum, 1847–1914, Edinburgh University Press (1968), ISBN 0-85224-029-5
- Galvan, Dennis Charles, "The State Must be our Master of Fire: How Peasants Craft Culturally Sustainable Development in Senegal", Berkeley, University of California Press, (2004). ISBN 978-0-520-23591-5.
- Price, Joan A., Sacred Scriptures of the World Religions: An Introduction, Continuum International Publishing Group (2010), ISBN 082642354X

=== Further reading ===
- Sonko-Godwin, Patience, "Ethnic groups of the Senegambia Region", Sunrise Publishers Ltd (2003), ASIN B007HFNIHS
- Sonko-Godwin, Patience, "Leaders of the Senegambia Region", Reaction to European infiltration 19th-20th Century, Sunrise Publishers Ltd (1995), ISBN 9983-8600-2-3
- Faye, Louis Diène, "Mort et Naissance le monde sereer", Les Nouvelles Edition Africaines (1983), ISBN 2-7236-0868-9
- Crousse, Bernard, Le Bris, Émile & Le Roy, Étienne, "Espaces disputés en Afrique noire: pratiques foncières locales", Karthala, ISBN 2-86537-146-8
- Gastellu, Jean-Marc, "L'égalitarisme économique des Serer du Sénégal", ORSTOM, Paris, 1981, ISBN 2-7099-0591-4 (Thèse de Sciences économiques soutenue à l'Université Paris 10 en 1978)
- Cyr Descamps, Guy Thilmans et Y. ThommeretLes tumulus coquilliers des îles du Saloum (Sénégal), Bulletin ASEQUA, Dakar, Université Cheikh Anta Diop, Dakar, 1979, n° 54
- Kalis, Simone, "Médecine traditionnelle, religion et divination chez les Seereer Siin du Sénégal", (La connaissance de la nuit), L'Harmattan (1997), ISBN 2-7384-5196-9
- Ngom, Pierre, Gaye, Aliou, & Sarr, Ibrahima, "Ethnic Diversity and Assimilation in Senegal: Evidence from the 1998 Census", University of Pennsylvania – African Census Analysis Project (ACAP), (February 2000)
