= Safen language =

Cangin language spoken in Senegal

Safene
- Saafi-Saafi
- Native to: Senegal
- Ethnicity: Saafi people
- Native speakers: 200,000 (2012)
- Language family: Niger–Congo?: Atlantic–Congo; Senegambian; Cangin; Safene
- Writing system: Latin, Arabic

Language codes
- ISO 639-3: sav
- Glottolog: saaf1238

- Person: Saafi
- People: Saafici
- Language: Saafi-Saafi
- Country: Safene

Safene (Saafen), Safi or Saafi-Saafi, is the principal Cangin language, spoken by 200,000 people in Senegal. Speakers are heavily concentrated in the area surrounding Dakar, particularly in the Thiès Region.

== Orthography ==
The Safen language is written in either the Arabic or the Latin script. The official orthography uses a Latin alphabet with 23 consonants and 5 vowels.

Alphabet
A	B	Ɓ	C	D	Ɗ	E	F	G	H	I	J	K	L	M	N	Ñ	Ŋ	O	P	R	S	T	U	W	Y	Ƴ	’
a	b	ɓ	c	d	ɗ	e	f	g	h	i	j	k	l	m	n	ñ	ŋ	o	p	r	s	t	u	w	y	ƴ	’

== Bibliography ==
- (in English) Walter Pichl, The Cangin Group - A Language Group in Northern Senegal, Pittsburgh, PA : Institute of African Affairs, Duquesne University, Coll. African Reprint Series, 1966, vol. 20
- (in French) Chérif Mbodj, Recherches sur la phonologie et la morphologie de la langue saafi. Le parler de Boukhou, Université de Nice, 1984
