= Laa =

Laa or LAA may refer to:

== Laa ==
- Laa an der Thaya, Lower Austria
- Laa (Gemeinde Zettling), Styria
- Laa Formation, geologic formation in Austria
- Laa River, Sulawesi, Indonesia
- Laalaa people, an ethnic group in Senegal
- Lehar language, a language spoken by the Laalaa people of Senegal
- Lehar Region also called Laa, located in Senegal
- Laa (TV serial)
- Laa Laa, a character from the children's TV show Teletubbies

== LAA ==
- Legal Aid Agency, an agency of the UK's Ministry of Justice
- L'Artibonite in Action, a political party of Haiti
- Lamar Municipal Airport (Colorado), via its IATA airport code and FAA location identifier
- Libyan Airlines, via its ICAO airline designator
- License Assisted Access
- Local Access Alert
- Local area agreement
- Locally Administered Address, a type of MAC address
- Los Angeles Airways, a former helicopter airline
- Los Angeles Angels, a baseball team
- Latrobe Athletic Association, a late 19th-early 20th century American football club
- London Ashford Airport Ltd., the operator of Lydd Airport
- Light Aircraft Association, UK based organisation for recreational flying
- Large Address Awareness, a memory addressing mode in x86-64 processors
- Lebanese Arab Army

== See also ==
- Lah (disambiguation)
