= Serer people =

West African ethnoreligious group and nation

Seereer
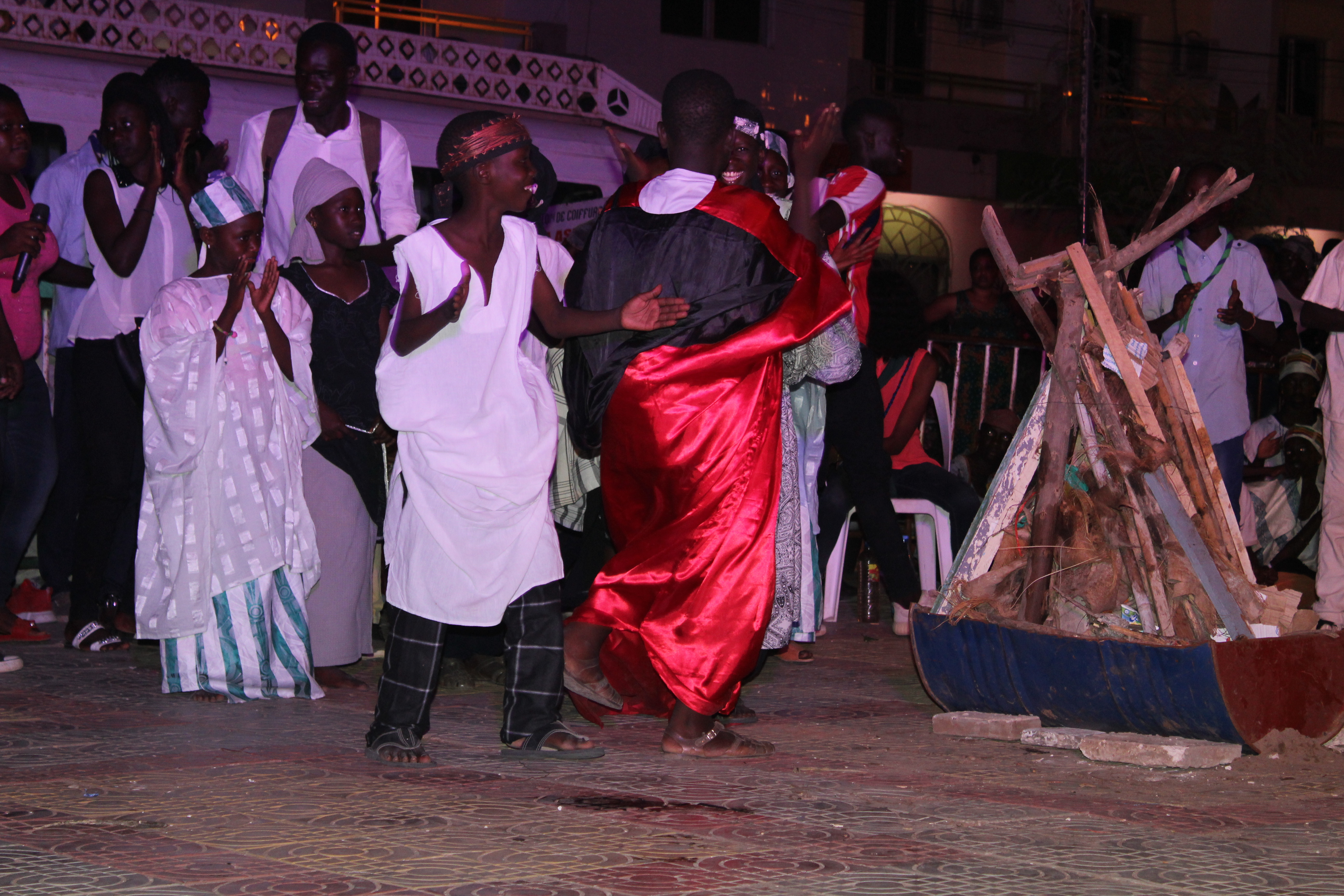
- Serer cultural vigil in Senegal.

Total population
- Over 3 million (as of 2023)

Regions with significant populations
- Senegal: 2,941,545 (2023 estimates)
- Gambia: 88,316 (2023)
- Mauritania: 5,000 (unupdated old estimate)

Languages
- Serer, Cangin languages, Wolof, French (Senegal and Mauritania), Arabic (Mauritania), English (Gambia)

Religion
- Senegal 2002: 90% Islam, 8% Christianity and 2% Serer religion (a ƭat Roog)

Related ethnic groups
- Wolof people, Jola people, Toucouleur people and Lebou people

The Serer people (Serer proper: Seereer or Sereer) are a West African ethnoreligious group and nation, "today scattered in several small states on the coast or pushed back into the woods of the interior, must be one of the oldest in Senegambia." They are the third-largest ethnic group in Senegal, making up 16% of the Senegalese population. They also reside in northern Gambia and southern Mauritania.

The Serer people originated in the Senegal River Valley, at the border of present-day Senegal and Mauritania, and moved south in the 11th and 12th century and migrated again in the 15th and 16th centuries. They have had a sedentary settled culture and have been known for their farming expertise and transhumant stock-raising.

The Serer people have been historically noted as an ethnic group practicing endogamy, and elements of both matrilineality and patrilineality. They fought against jihads in the 19th century, and subsequently opposed French colonial rule - resulting in Serer victory at the famous Battle of Djilass (13 May 1859), and the French Empire taking revenge against them at the equally famous Battle of Logandème that same year.

In the 20th century, most of the Serer converted to Islam (Sufism); however, some are Christians or follow their traditional religion.

The Serer society, like other ethnic groups in Senegal, has had social stratification featuring endogamous castes and slaves. Other historians, such as Thiaw, Richard and others, believe that the Serer did not maintain a slave culture, or at least not to the same extent as other ethnic groups in the Senegambia region. Serer religion and culture also forbids slavery.

== Other spelling ==
The Serer people are also referred to as:

Serer proper: Seereer or Sereer
French: Sérère
Other spelling: Sarer, Kegueme (possible corruption of Serer-Dyegueme), Serrere, Serere, Ceereer/Cereer (from Ceereer ne ("the Seereer people" in Serer, found in early European spelling/maps), and sometimes wrongly Serre

== Demographics and distribution ==
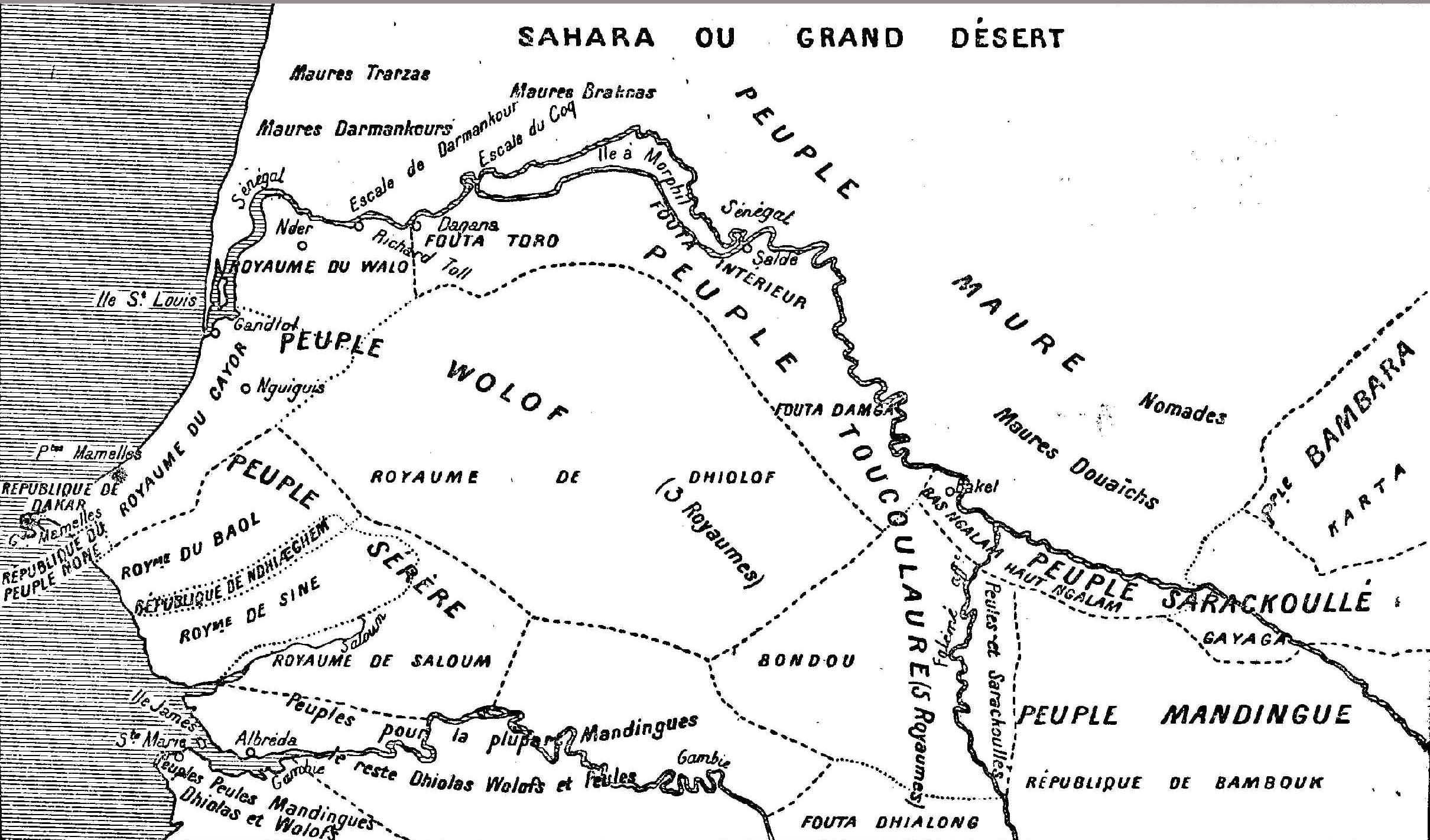
An ethnic map of Senegal in 1853, drawn by the French. The Serer people region is marked "Peuple Sérère" (left, center).

The Serer people are primarily found in contemporary Senegal, particularly in the west-central part of the country, running from the southern edge of Dakar to the border of The Gambia. The Serer include the various Serer peoples of which the Seex people (pronounced Seh) are the most numerous.

The Serer-Noon occupy the ancient area of Thiès in modern-day Senegal. The Serer-Ndut are found in southern Cayor and north west of ancient Thiès. The Serer-Njeghen occupy old Baol; the Serer-Palor occupy the west central, west southwest of Thiès and the Serer-Laalaa occupy west central, north of Thiès and the Tambacounda area.

The Serer people are diverse. Although they lived throughout the Senegambia region, they are more numerous in places such as old Baol, Sine, Saloum and in The Gambia, which was a colony of the Kingdom of Saloum. There they occupy parts of old Nuimi and Baddibu as well as the Gambian Kombo.

- Senegal: 2,941,545.6 million (2023 estimates) (16% of total population)
- The Gambia: 88,316.45 (2019-2020 estimates, 3.5% of total population according to Gambia)
- Mauritania: 5,000

The Seex (also called Sine-Sine, Serer, Seh, Seeh, or Serer-Sine) occupy the Sine and Saloum areas, now part of modern-day independent Senegal. The Serer people include the Seex, Serer-Noon (or Serer-None, Serer-Non, or Noon), Serer-Ndut (or N’doute), Serer-Jegem/Serer-Njeghen (or Serer-Dyegueme, Serer-Gyegem, or Serer-N'Diéghem), Serer-Safene, Serer-Niominka, Serer-Palor (or Falor, Palar, Siili, Siili-Mantine, Siili-Siili, Waro, or Serer), and the Serer-Laalaa (or Laa, La, Lâ, or Serer). Each group speaks Serer or a Cangin language. "Serer" is the standard spelling in English speaking Gambia. "Seereer" or "Sereer" reflects the Serer pronunciation of the name and are spellings used mostly by Senegalese Serer historians, linguists or scholars. "Sérère" is the standard spelling in French speaking Senegal and Mauritania.

== Ethnonym ==
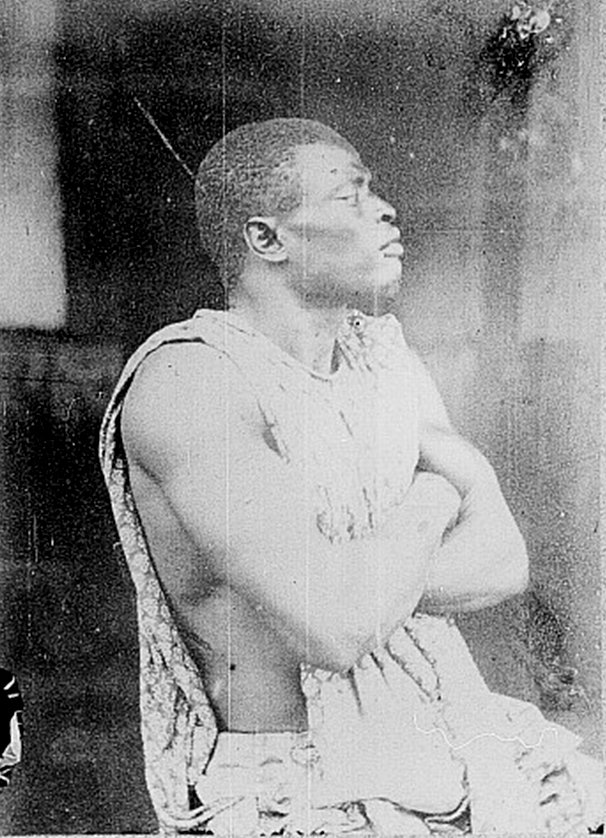
A 21-year-old Serer rifleman in 1881.

The meaning of the word "Serer" is uncertain. Professor Issa Laye Thiaw view it as ancient and sacred, and pre-Islamic, and thus rejects the following four modern definitions rooted in their historical rejection of Islam:

- From the Serer Wolof word reer meaning 'misplaced', i.e. doubting the truth of Islam.
- From the Serer Wolof expression seer reer meaning "to find something hidden or lost."
- From "the Arabic word seereer meaning sahir magician or one who practices magic (an allusion to the traditional religion)"
- From a Pulaar word meaning separation, divorce, or break, again referring to rejecting Islam.

Professor Cheikh Anta Diop, citing the work of 19th-century French archeologist and Egyptologist, Paul Pierret, states that the word Serer means "he who traces the temple." Diop continued:

"That would be consistent with their present religious position: they are one of the rare Senegalese populations who still reject Islam. Their route is marked by the upright stones found at about the same latitude from Ethiopia all the way to the Sine-Salum, their present habitat."

R. G. Schuh have refuted Diop's thesises in general. Professor Molefi Kete Asante et al. agrees pretty much with Professor Diop, and posits that, "they are an ancient people whose history reaches deep into the past..." and that would be consistent with their "strong connection to their ancient religious past".

== History ==
Professor Dennis Galvan writes that "The oral historical record, written accounts by early Arab and European explorers, and physical anthropological evidence suggest that the various Serer peoples migrated south from the Fuuta Tooro region (Senegal River valley) beginning around the eleventh century when Islam first came across the Sahara." Over generations these people, possibly Pulaar-speaking herders originally, migrated through Wolof areas and entered the Siin and Saluum river valleys. This lengthy period of Wolof-Serer contact has clouded the origins of shared "terminology, institutions, political structures, and practices."

If one is to believe the economist and demographer Étienne Van de Walle who gave a slightly later date for their ethnogenesis, writing that "The formation of the Sereer ethnicity goes back to the thirteenth century, when a group came from the Senegal River valley in the north fleeing Islam, and near Niakhar met another group of Mandinka origin, called the Gelwar, who came from the southeast (Gravrand 1983). The actual Sereer ethnic group is a mixture of the two groups, and this may explain their complex bilinear kinship system".

Their own oral traditions recite legends that relate their being "part of, or closely related to, the same group as the ancestors of today's Tukulor" (Toucouleur people) in the Senegal River valley area. Serer people resisted Islamization (and later Wolofization) from as early as the 11th century during the Almoravid movement. By around 1030 - 1035, during the reign of the Muslim leader, War Jabi, the Serers refused War Jabi's forced conversion and Sharia law, resulting in Serer ultimate defeat, and eventually, the initial Serer exodus from Tekrur. They migrated south where they intermixed with the Diola people (whom they have an ancient relationship with).

After the Ghana Empire was sacked as certain kingdoms gained their independence, Abu-Bakr Ibn-Umar, leader of the Almoravids, launched a jihad into the region. According to Serer oral history, a Serer bowman named Amar Godomat shot and killed Abu-Bakr Ibn-Umar with an arrow. They also violently resisted the 19th-century jihads and Marabout movement to convert Senegambia to Islam.

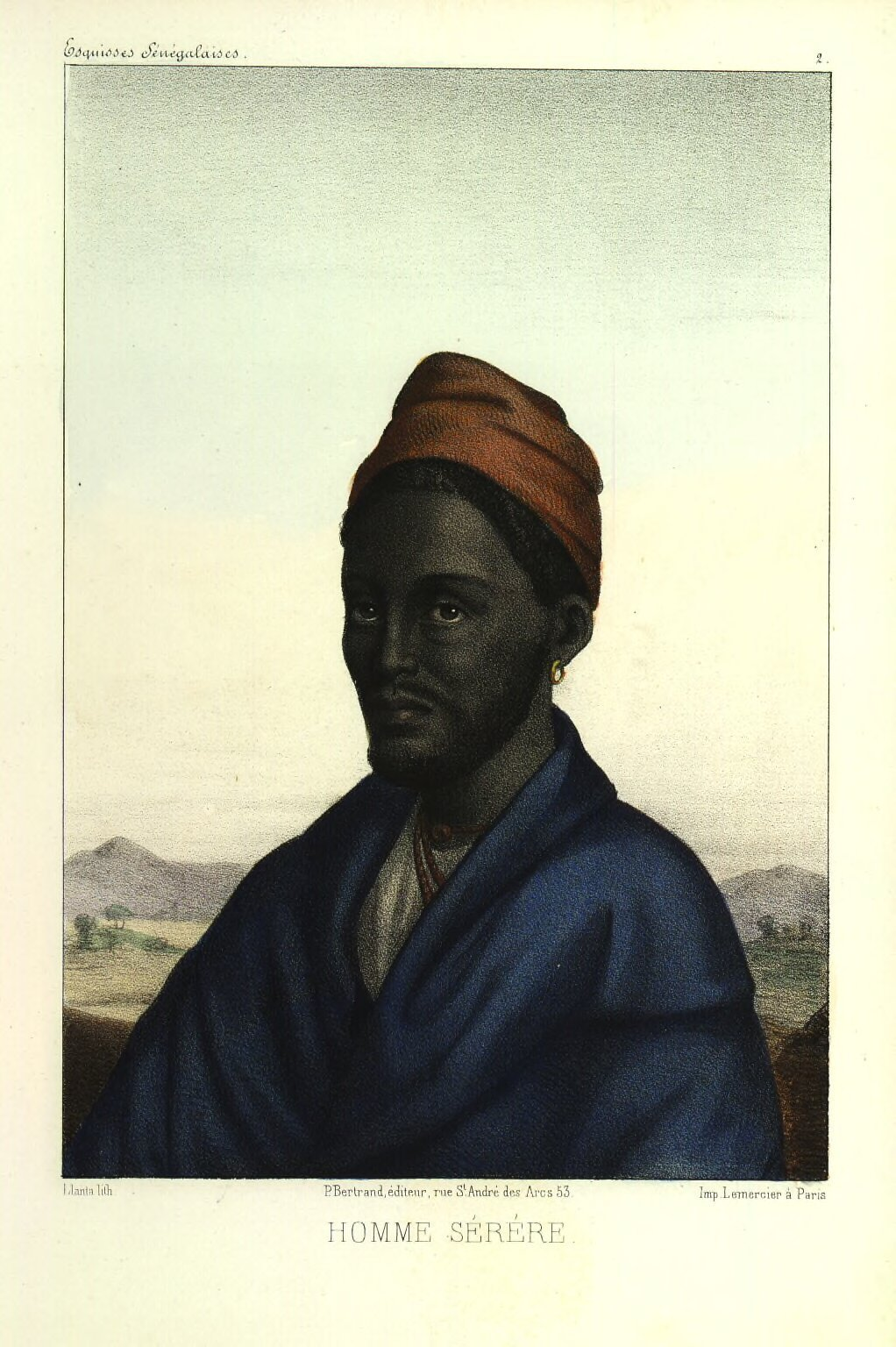
Kings of Sine : Maad a Sinig Ama Joof Gnilane Faye Joof. Reign : c. 1825 – 1853.

=== Last Serer kings ===
The last kings of Sine and Saloum were Maad a Sinig Mahecor Joof (also spelled: Mahecor Diouf) and Maad Saloum Fode N'Gouye Joof (also spelled: Fodé N’Gouye Diouf or Fode Ngui Joof), respectively. They both died in 1969.

After their deaths, the Serer Kingdoms of Sine and Saloum were incorporated into independent Senegal, which had gained its independence from France in 1960. The Serer kingdoms of Sine and Saloum are two of the few pre-colonial African kingdoms whose royal dynasty survived up to the 20th century.

In 2017 and 2019, the Serers of Saloum and Sine (respectively) decided to reinstate their monarchies from the same Guelowar matrilineage that had ruled for over six-hundred years, and one of the many Serer maternal clans. Maad Saloum Thierno Coumba Daga Ndao was crowned King of Saloum on 21 May 2017 at Kahone (the precolonial capital of Saloum). His maternal nephew, Maad a Sinig Niokhobaye Fatou Diène Diouf, from the Royal House of Semou Njekeh Joof was crowned King of Sine on 8 February 2019 at Diakhao (the precolonial of Sine). He is the son of Lingeer Fatou Diène, and a paternal descendants of Maad Semou Njekeh Joof - via Maad Saloum Semou Mak Joof (the 19th century King of Sine). Niokhobaye Diouf and Thierno Ndao rule as constitutional monarchs, since Sine and Saloum are no longer kingdoms, but now part of modern-day independent Senegal. They have no powers compared to their ancestors. Their roles are simply ceremonial and diplomatic. Niokhobaye Diouf is however, very influential in the Senegambia region, and has been able to utilise the Serer and Jola bond of cousinage to bring about peace in Casamance, which has been the plague of consecutive Senegalese and Gambian presidents - following decades long of the Casamance conflict. He is also proactive in bringing about economic and cultural development.

=== Serer kingdoms ===
Serer royal and religious titles
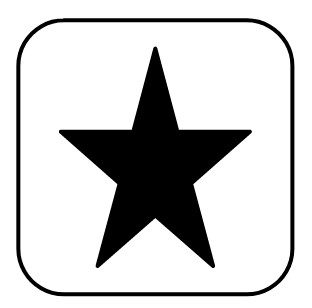
- Royal titles
- Lamane (also religious)
- Maad
- Maad a Sinig
- Maad Saloum
- Teigne
- Lingeer
- Line of succession
- Buumi
- Thilas
- Loul Religious titles
- Saltigue

Serer kingdoms included the Kingdom of Sine and the Kingdom of Saloum. In addition to these twin Serer kingdoms, the Serer ruled in the Wolof kingdoms, such as Jolof, Waalo (through the Joos Maternal Dynasty), Cayor and Baol. The Kingdom of Baol was originally an old Serer Kingdom ruled by the Serer paternal dynasties, such as the Joof family, the Njie family, etc. and the Wagadou maternal dynasty prior to the Battle of Danki in 1549.

The Faal (var: Fall) paternal dynasty of Cayor (who ruled using the title Damel) and Baol that ruled after 1549 following the Battle of Danki were originally Black Moors patrilineally (Naari Kajoor) or Serer according to Professor Cheikh Anta Diop, along with their adopted title Damel. Although the surname Faal is not typically regarded as a Serer surname, there are Serers surnamed Faal/Fall, and the maternal grandmother of Damel-Teigne Amari Ngoneh Sobel Faal, Lingeer Sobel Joof (mother of Ngoneh Sobel Njie, Amari's own mother) was a Serer, and a descendants of Maad Ndaah Njemeh Joof, the medieval King of Laah, Baol. For more on that, see the Joof family. Prior to the Faal dynasty of Cayor and Baol, these two kingdoms were ruled by the Serer people with the patrilineages "Joof" or Diouf, Faye and Njie, and the maternal lineage of Wagadou – members of the royal families from the Ghana Empire (proper "Wagadou Empire") who married into the Serer aristocracy.

All the kings that ruled Serer Kingdoms had Serer surnames, with the exception of the Mboge and Faal paternal dynasties whose reigns are very recent. They did not provide many kings.

== Religion ==
The Serer traditional religion is called a ƭat Roog ('the way of the Divine'). It believes in a universal Supreme Deity called Roog (var : Rog). The Cangin-language speakers refer to the supreme being as Koox. Serer religious beliefs encompasses ancient chants and poems; veneration and offerings to Serer gods, goddesses, and the pangool (ancestral spirits and saints); astronomy; rites of passage; medicine; cosmology; and the history of the Serer people.

In contemporary times, about 85% of the Serers are Muslim, while others are Christian. Some Serer still follow Serer spiritual beliefs.

According to James Olson, professor of History specializing in Ethnic Group studies, the Serer people "violently resisted the expansion of Islam" by the Wolof people in the 19th century. They were a target of the 1861 jihad led by the Mandinka cleric Ma Ba Jaxoo. The inter-ethnic wars involving the Serer continued till 1887, when the French colonial forces conquered Senegal. Thereafter, the conversion of the Serer people accelerated.

By the early 1910s, about 40% of the Serer people had adopted Islam, and by the 1990s about 85% of them were Muslims. Most of the newly converted Serer people have joined Sufi Muslim Brotherhoods, particularly the Mouride and Tijaniyyah Tariqas.

== Society ==
=== Occupation ===
The Serer people, known for their mixed-farming, are people of the land and sea. The Serer practice trade, agriculture, fishing, boat building and animal husbandry. Traditionally the Serer people have been farmers and landowners. Although they practice animal husbandry, they are generally less known for that, as in the past, Serer nobles entrusted their herds to the pastoralist Fula, a practice that continues today.

However, they are known for their mixed-farming. Trade is also a recent phenomenon among some Serers. For the Serer, the soil (where their ancestors lay in rest) is very important to them and they guard it with jealousy. They have a legal framework governing every aspect of life, even land law, with strict guidelines. Apart from agriculture (and other forms of production or occupation such as animal husbandry, fishing especially among the Serer-Niominka, boat building, etc.), some occupations, especially trade, they viewed as vulgar, common and ignoble. Hence in the colonial era, especially among the Serer nobles, they would hire others to do the trading on their behalf (e.g. Moors) acting as their middlemen.

=== Social stratification ===
The Serer people have traditionally been a socially stratified society, like many West African ethnic groups with castes.

The mainstream view has been that the Mandinka (or Malinka) Guelowars of Kaabu conquered and subjugated the Serer people. That view (propelled during the colonial era probably due to anti-Serer sentiments) has now been discarded as there is nothing in the Serer oral tradition that speaks of a military conquest, but a union based on marriage. A marriage between the noble Guelowar maternal clan and the noble Serer patriclans. This view is supported by Senegalese historians and writers such as Alioune Sarr, Biram Ngom and Babacar Sédikh Diouf. With the exception of Maysa Wali, this would explain why none of the kings of Sine and Saloum (two of the Serer precolonial kingdoms) bore Mandinka surnames, but Serer surname throughout the 600 years reign of the Guelwar maternal dynasty. The Serer noble patriclans simply married Guelowar women, and their offsprings bearing Serer surnames reigned in Sine and Saloum. The Guelowars also viewed themselves as Serer and assimilated in Serer culture. The alliance was an alliance based on marriage.

In other regions where Serer people are found, state JD Fage, Richard Gray and Roland Oliver, the Wolof and Toucouleur peoples introduced the caste system among the Serer people.

The social stratification historically evidenced among the Serer people has been, except for one difference, very similar to those found among Wolof, Fulbe, Toucouleur and Mandinka peoples found in Senegambia. They all have had strata of free nobles and peasants, artisan castes, and slaves. The difference is that the Serer people have retained a matrilineal inheritance system. According to historian Martin A. Klein the caste systems among the Serer emerged as a consequence of the Mandinka people's Sine-Saloum guelowar conquest, and when the Serer people sought to adapt and participate in the new Senegambian state system.

The previously held view that the Serer only follow a matrilineal structure is a matter of conjecture. Although matrilineality (tiim in Serer) is very important in Serer culture, the Serer follow a bilineal system. Both matrilineality and patrilineality are important in Serer custom. Inheritance depends on the nature of the asset being inherited. That is, whether the asset is a maternal (ƭeen yaay) or paternal (kucarla) asset.

The hierarchical highest status among the Serer people has been those of hereditary nobles and their relatives, which meant blood links to the Mandinka conquerors. Below the nobles, came tyeddo, or the warriors and chiefs who had helped the Mandinka rulers and paid tribute. The third status, and the largest strata came to be the jambur, or free peasants who lacked the power of the nobles. Below the jambur were the artisan castes, who inherited their occupation. These castes included blacksmiths, weavers, jewelers, leatherworkers, carpenters, griots who kept the oral tradition through songs and music. Of these, all castes had a taboo in marrying a griot, and they could not be buried like others. Below the artisan castes in social status have been the slaves, who were either bought at slave markets, seized as captives, or born to a slave parent.

The view that the jambur (or jambuur) caste were among the lower echelons of society is a matter of debate. The jaraff, who was the most important person after the king (Maad a Sinig or Maad Saloum) came from the jambur caste. The Jaraff was the equivalent of a prime minister. He was responsible for organising the coronation ceremony and for crowning the Serer kings. Where a king dies without nominating an heir (buumi), the Jaraff would step in and reign as regent until a suitable candidate can be found from the royal line. The noble council that was responsible for advising the king was also made up of jamburs as well as the paar no maad (or buur/bur kuvel/guewel) - the chief griot of the king, who was extremely powerful and influential, and very rich in land and other assets. The paar no maad who also came from the griot caste were so powerful that they could influence a king's decision as to whether he goes to war or not. They told the king what to eat, and teach them how to eat, how to walk, to talk and to behave in society. They always accompany the king to the battlefield and recount the glory or bravery of his ancestors in battle. They retain and pass down the genealogy and family history of the king. The paar no maad could make or break a king, and destroy the entire royal dynasty if they so wish. The abdication of Maad Saloum Fakha Boya Fall from the throne of Saloum was led and driven by his own paar no maad (or bur kevel). After being forced to abdicate, he was chased out of Saloum. During the reign of Maad a Sinig Sanmoon Faye – king of Sine, one of the key notables who plotted to dethrone the king was the king's own paar no maad. After influencing the king's own estranged nephew Prince Semou Mak Joof to take up arms against his uncle, the Prince who despised his uncle took up arms with the support of the paar no maad and other notables. The Prince was victorious and was crowned Maad a Sinig (King of Sine). That is just a sample of the power of the paar no maad who was also a member of the griot caste.

The slave castes continue to be despised, they do not own land and work as tenant farmers, marriage across caste lines is forbidden and lying about one's caste prior to marriage has been a ground for divorce. The land has been owned by the upper social strata, with the better plots near the villages belonging to the nobles. The social status of the slave has been inherited by birth.

Serer religion and culture forbids slavery. "To enslave another human being is regarded as an enslavement of their soul thereby preventing the very soul of the slave owner or trader from entering Jaaniiw – the sacred place where good souls go after their physical body has departed the world of the living. In accordance with the teachings of Seereer religion, bad souls will not enter Jaaniiw. Their departed souls will not be guided by the ancestors to this sacred abode, but will be rejected thereby making them lost and wandering souls. In order to be reincarnated (Ciiɗ, in Seereer) or sanctified as a Pangool in order to intercede with the Divine [ Roog ], a person's soul must first enter this sacred place." As such, the Serers who were the victims of Islamic jihads and enslavements did not participate much in slavery and when they do, it was merely in revenge. This view is supported by scholars such as François G. Richard who posits that:

The Kingdom of Sine remained a modest participant in the Atlantic system, secondary to the larger Wolof, Halpulaar [ Fula and Toucouleur people ] or Mandinka polities surrounding it on all sides... As practices of enslavement intensified among other ethnic groups during the 18th century, fuelling a lucrative commerce in captives and the rise of internal slavery, the Siin may have been demoted to the rank of second player, in so far as the kingdom was never a major supplier of captives.

The Serer ethnic group is rather diverse, and as Martin A. Klein notes, the institution of slavery did not exist among the Serer-Noon and N'Dieghem.

== Culture ==
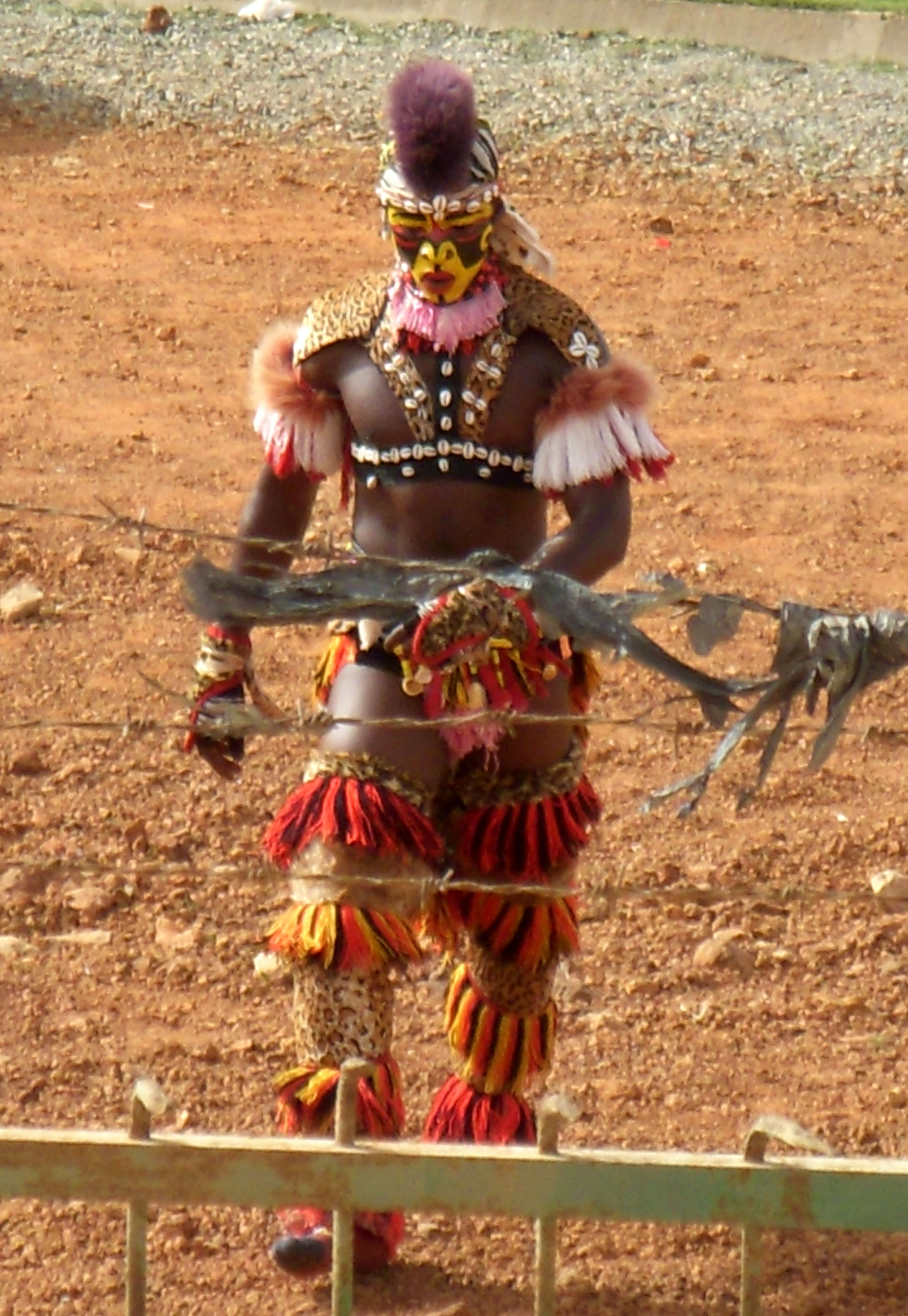
Serer wrestling. Rituals and regalia based on Serer tradition. See Senegalese wrestling

The Serer's favourite food is called chere or saay, pounded coos in the Serer language. They control all the phases of this dish from production to preparation. Other ethnic groups (or Serers), tend to buy it from Serer women market traders or contract it out to them especially if they are holding major ceremonial events. Chere is very versatile and can be eaten with fermented milk or cream and sugar as a breakfast cereal or prepared just as a standard couscous. The Serer traditional attire is called sër / serr (Serer proper: "pay"). It is normally woven by Serer men and believed to bring good luck among those who wear it. Marriages are usually arranged. In the event of the death of an elder, the sacred "Gamba" (a big calabash with a small hollow-out) is beaten followed by the usual funeral regalia to send them off to the next life.

As an ethnoreligious group and nation, the practice of endogamy, as mandated by A ƭat Roog (Serer spirituality) and Serer culture is strongly adhered to. They usually marry among themselves or within other Serer sub-groups. This is particular true amongs the Serer-Noon, who do not often marry out, but only chose to marry amongs themselves or other Serer groups. Anthropologist and senior lecturer in Social and Cultural Anthropology, Dr Pauline Aligwekwe notes that:

"Endogamy of cast had more of a peculiar character. It was normally practiced in order to satisfy what was described as the "pride and the safety" of the purity of blood of the group. Endogamy within kinship group or even within a lineage was also given similar reasons. The Peuhl and the Serer of Senegal are typical examples of where kinship endogamy was practiced."

=== Wrestling and sports ===
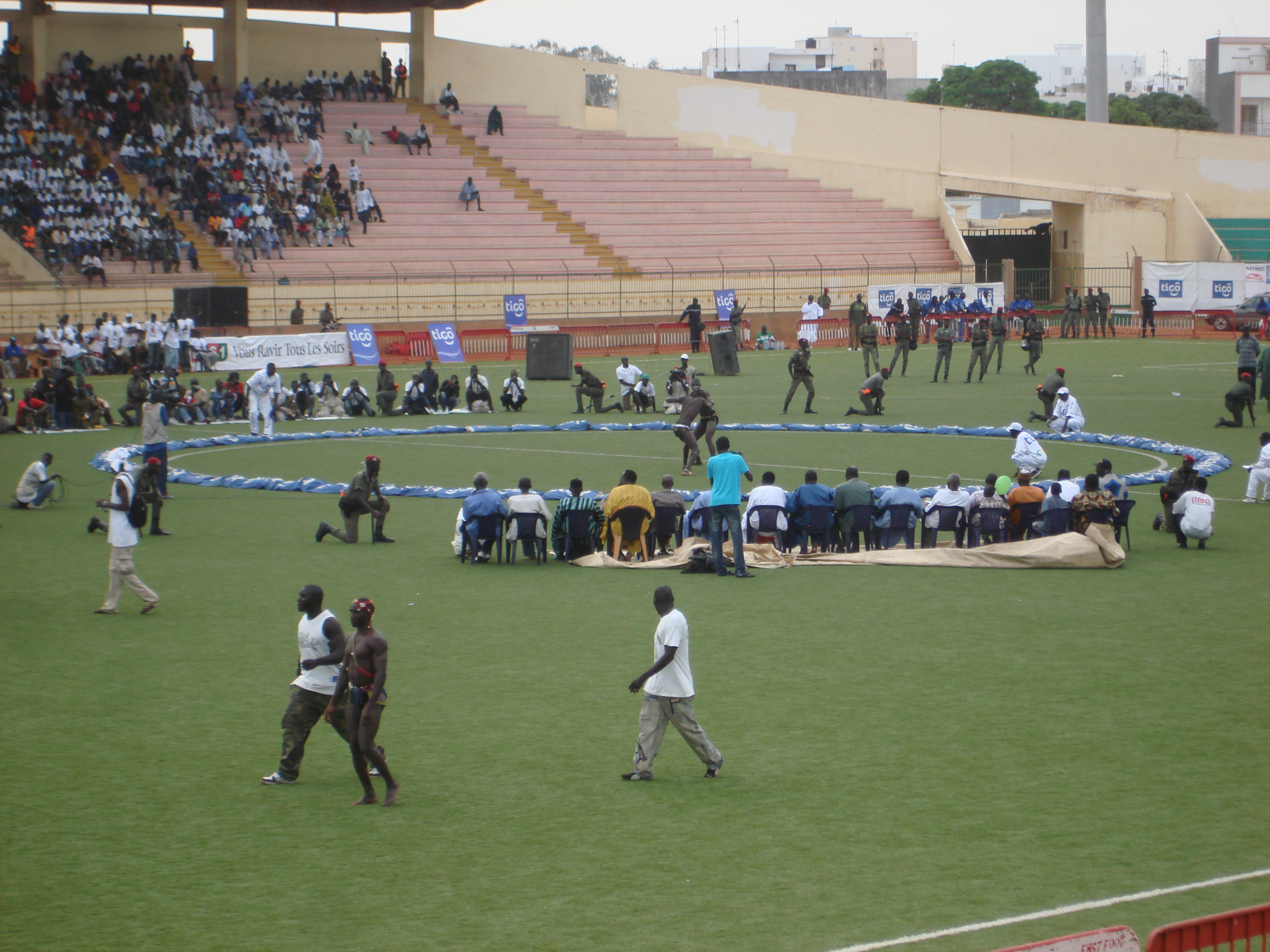
Senegalese wrestling match at the stade Demba Diop in Dakar. Serer tradition

Senegalese wrestling called "Laamb" or Njom in Serer originated from the Serer Kingdom of Sine. It was a preparatory exercise for war among the warrior classes. That style of wrestling (a brutal and violent form) is totally different from the sport wrestling enjoyed by all Senegambian ethnic groups today, nevertheless, the ancient rituals are still visible in the sport version. Among the Serers, wrestling is classified into different techniques and each technique takes several years to master. Children start young trying to master the basics before moving on to the more advance techniques like the "mbapatte", which is one of the oldest techniques and totally different from modern wrestling. Yékini (real name: "Yakhya Diop"), who is a professional wrestler in Senegal is one of the top wrestlers proficient in the "mbapatte" technique. Lamba and sabar (musical instruments) are used as music accompaniments in wrestling matches as well as in circumcision dances and royal festivals. Serer wrestling crosses ethnic boundaries and is a favourite pastime for Senegalese and Gambians alike.

=== Music ===
"The Serer people are known especially for their rich knowledge of vocal and rhythmic practices that infuse their everyday language with complex overlapping cadences and their ritual with intense collaborative layerings of voice and rhythm."

— Ali Colleen Neff

The Sabar (drum) tradition associated with the Wolof people originated from the Serer Kingdom of Sine and spread to the Kingdom of Saloum. The Wolof people who migrated to Serer Saloum picked it up from there and spread it to Wolof Kingdoms. Each motif has a purpose and is used for different occasions. Individual motifs represent the history and genealogy of a particular family and are used during weddings, naming ceremonies, funerals etc.

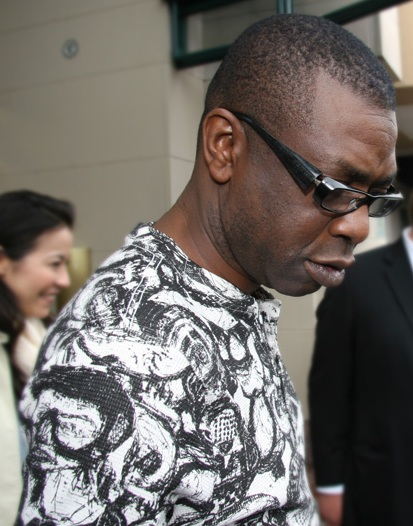
N'Dour at the 2008 Toronto International Film Festival

The Njuup (progenitor of Mbalax) and Tassu traditions (also Tassou) (progenitor of rap music) both originated from the Serer people. The Tassu was used when chanting ancient religious verses. The people would sing then interweave it with a Tassu. The late Serer Diva Yandé Codou Sène who was the griot of the late and former president of Senegal (Leopold Sedar Senghor) was proficient in the "Tassu". She was the best Tassukat (one who Tassu) of her generation. Originally religious in nature, the griots of Senegambia regardless of ethnic group or religion picked it up from Serer religious practices and still use it in different occasions e.g. marriages, naming ceremonies or when they are just singing the praises of their patrons. Most Senegalese and Gambian artists use it in their songs even the younger generation like "Baay Bia". The Senegalese music legend Youssou N'Dour, uses "Tassu" in many of his songs.

==== Serer relations to Moors ====
In the pre-colonial era, Arabo-Berber/Moors from Mauritania who came to settle in the Serer kingdoms such as the Kingdom of Sine, etc., were ill-treated by their Serer masters. If a Moor dies in a Serer kingdom, his body was dragged out of the country and left for the vultures to feast on if there is no family or friend to claim the body and bury it elsewhere. They were also never accompanied by grave goods. No matter how long a Mauritanian Moor has lived in the area as a migrant, he could never achieve high status within the Serer aristocracy. The best position he could ever wish for within Serer high society was to work as a Bissit (Bissik). Apart from spying for the Serer Kings, the Bissit's main job was to be a clown – for the sole entertainment of the Serer King, the Serer aristocracy and the common people. He was expected to dance in ceremonies before the king and liven up the king's mood and the king's subjects. This position was always given to the Moors. It was a humiliating job and not a title of honour. According to some, the history of this position goes back to an early Moor in Serer country who had a child by his own daughter. The Serer view Arabs as "unclean" and not worthy of being buried in the same soil their ancestors are laid to rest.

=== Serer relation to Jews ===
In the 14th - 17th centuries, some Portuguese Jewish traders settled in Serer country, notably in the Petite Cote and Joal-Fadiouth, in the Serer precolonial Kingdom of Sine (now part of present-day Senegal), and were welcomed, protected, and permitted to practice their religion in peace by the Serer kings and people.

=== Joking relationship (Maasir or Kalir) ===
Serers and Toucouleurs are linked by a bond of "cousinage". This is a tradition common to many ethnic groups of West Africa known as Maasir (var : Massir) in Serer language (Joking relationship) or kal, which comes from kalir (a deformation of the Serer word kucarla meaning paternal lineage or paternal inheritance). This joking relationship enables one group to criticise another, but also obliges the other with mutual aid and respect. The Serers call this Maasir or Kalir. This is because the Serers and the Toucouleurs are related – according to Wiliam J. foltz "Tukulor are a mixture of Fulani and Serer" The Serers also maintain the same bond with the Jola people with whom they have an ancient relationship based on the legend of Jambooñ and Agaire. In the Serer ethnic group, this same bond exists between the Serer patronym, for example between Joof and Faye families.

Many Senegambian people also refer to this joking relations as "kal" (used between first cousins for example between the children of a paternal aunt and a maternal uncle) and "gamo" (used between tribes). "Kal" derives from the Serer word "Kalir" a deformation of "kurcala" which means paternal lineage or inheritance and is used exactly in that context by many Senegambians. The word gamo derives from the old Serer word gamohu – an ancient divination ceremony.

== Serer languages ==
Most people who identify themselves as Serer speak the Serer language. This is spoken in Sine-Saloum, Kaolack, Diourbel, Dakar, and in Gambia, and is part of the national curriculum of Senegal. Historically the Serer people's unwillingness to trade directly during the colonial era was a double edged sword to the Serer language as well as the Cangin languages. That resulted in the Wolof language being the dominant language in the market place as well as the factories. However, the Serer language, among other local languages, is now part of the national curriculum of Senegal.

About 200,000 Serer speak various Cangin languages, such as Ndut and Saafi, which are not closely related to Serer proper (Serer-Sine language). There are clear lexical similarities among the Cangin languages. However, they are more closely related to other languages than to Serer, and vice versa. For comparison in the table below, 85% is approximately the dividing line between dialects and different languages.

Cangin languages and Serer proper	% Similarity with Serer-Sine	% Similarity with Noon	% Similarity with Saafi	% Similarity with Ndut	% Similarity with Palor	% Similarity with Lehar (Laalaa)	Areas they are predominantly found	Estimated population
Lehar language (Laalaa)	22	84	74	68	68	N/A	West central, north of Thies, Pambal area, Mbaraglov, Dougnan; Tambacounda area. Also found in the Gambia	12,000 (Senegal figures only) (2007)
Ndut language	22	68	68	N/A	84	68	West central, northwest of Thiès	38,600 (Senegal figures only (2007)
Noon language	22	N/A	74	68	68	84	Thiès area.	32,900 (Senegal figures only (2007)
Palor language	22	68	74	84	N/A	68	West central, west southwest of Thiès	10,700 (Senegal figures only (2007)
Saafi language	22	74	N/A	68	74	74	Triangle southwest of and near Thiès (between Diamniadio, Popenguine, and Thiès)	114,000 (Senegal figures only (2007)
Serer-Sine language (not a Cangin language)	N/A	22	22	22	22	22	West central; Sine and Saloum River valleys. Also in the Gambia and small number in Mauritania	1,154,760 (Senegal – 2006 figures); 31,900 (the Gambia – 2006 figures) and 3,500 (Mauritania 2006 figures)

=== Serer patronyms ===
Some common Serer surnames are:

- Joof or Diouf
- Faye
- Ngom or Ngum
- Sène (var : Sene or Sain)
- Diagne
- Dione or Jon
- N'Diaye
- Tine
- Khan
- Lame
- Loum
- Ndaw or Ndao
- Diene (var : Diène) or Jein
- Thiaw
- Senghor
- Ndour or Ndur
- Ndione
- Gadio
- Sarr
- Kama
- Chorr or Thior
- Charreh or Thiare
- Dièye or Jaye (var : Jaay) etc... are all typical Serer surnames.

== Notable Serer people ==
- Léopold Sedar Senghor, first president of Senegal from 1960 to 1980
- Abdou Diouf, second president of Senegal and former secretary general of the Organisation Internationale de la Francophonie
- Ngalandou Diouf, the first African elected to office in French West Africa
- Al Njie, Senegalese footballer
- Marième Faye Sall – current First Lady of Senegal (as of 2020); wife of President Macky Sall (whose mother is Serer).
- Fallou Diagne, Senegalese footballer
- Fatou Diome, Senegalese author
- Safi Faye, Senegalese film director and ethnologist
- Alhaji Alieu Ebrima Cham Joof late Senegambian historian, politician and colonial-era advocate for Gambia's independence
- Bai Modi Joof, Gambian lawyer and champion of free speech
- Laïty Kama, Senegalese Lawyer and the first president of the International Criminal Tribunal for Rwanda
- Issa Laye Thiaw, Senegalese historian and theologian
- Alioune Sarr, Senegalese historian and politician
- Isatou Njie-Saidy, former Vice-president of Gambia
- Bassirou Diomaye Faye, fifth president of Senegal
- Yandé Codou Sène, Senegalese griot and musician
- Youssou N'Dour, Senegalese musician
- Mame Biram Diouf, Senegalese footballer
- Robert Diouf, Senegalese wrestler
- El Hadji Diouf, Senegalese footballer
- Khaby Lame, Senegalese-born Italian social media personality
- Ismaïla Sarr, Senegalese footballer
- Malang Sarr, Senegalese footballer
- Oulimata Sarr, Senegalese politician
- Moustapha Name, Senegalese footballer
- Ousmane Ndong, Senegalese footballer
- Abdoulaye Faye, Senegalese footballer
- Joseph Henry Joof, Gambian lawyer and politician
- Marie Samuel Njie, Gambian singer,
- Pap Saine, Gambian editor and publisher
- Ibrahima Sarr, Mauritanian journalists and politician

== See also ==
Other ethnic groups

- Ethnic groups in Senegal
- Ethnic groups in the Gambia
- Ethnic groups in Mauritania
- List of African ethnic groups

Senegal

- Demographics of Senegal
- List of presidents of Senegal (As of 2024, Senegal has had five presidents after independence. The first, second, and fifth were Serers – 1960 – 2024).

Films

- Kaddu Beykat
- Mossane (Serer-themed)
- Yandé Codou, la griotte de Senghor

== Bibliography ==
- Diouf, Mamadou & Leichtman, Mara, New perspectives on Islam in Senegal: conversion, migration, wealth, power, and femininity. Published by: Palgrave Macmillan. 2009. the University of Michigan. ISBN 0-230-60648-2
- Diouf, Mamadou, History of Senegal: Islamo-Wolof model and its outskirts. Maisonneuve & Larose. 2001. ISBN 2-7068-1503-5
- Gamble, David P., & Salmon, Linda K. (with Alhaji Hassan Njie), Gambian Studies No. 17. People of the Gambia. I. The Wolof with notes on the Serer and Lebou San Francisco 1985.
- Niang, Mor Sadio, "CEREMONIES ET FÊTES TRADITIONNELLES", IFAN, [in] Éthiopiques, numéro 31 révue socialiste de culture négro-africaine 3e trimestre (1982)
- Taal, Ebou Momar, Senegambian Ethnic Groups: Common Origins and Cultural Affinities Factors and Forces of National Unity, Peace and Stability. 2010
- Diouf, Niokhobaye. "Chronique du royaume du Sine." Suivie de notes sur les traditions orales et les sources écrites concernant le royaume du Sine par Charles Becker et Victor Martin. (1972). Bulletin de l'Ifan, Tome 34, Série B, n° 4, (1972)
- Berg, Elizabeth L., & Wan, Ruth, "Senegal". Marshall Cavendish. 2009.
- Mahoney, Florence, Stories of Senegambia. Publisher by Government Printer, 1982
- Daggs, Elisa. All Africa: All its political entities of independent or other status. Hasting House, 1970. ISBN 0-8038-0336-2
- Department of Arts of Africa, Oceania, and the Americas, The Metropolitan Museum of Art. Hilburn Timeline of Art History. The Fulani/Fulbe People.
- Schuh, Russell G., The Use and Misuse of language in the study of African history. 1997
- Burke, Andrew & Else, David, The Gambia & Senegal, 2nd edition – September 2002. Published by Lonely Planet Publications Pty Ltd, page 13
- Nanjira, Daniel Don, African Foreign Policy and Diplomacy: From Antiquity to the 21st Century. Page 91–92. Published by ABC-CLIO. 2010. ISBN 0-313-37982-3
- Lombard, Maurice, The golden age of Islam. Page 84. Markus Wiener Publishers. 2003. ISBN 1-55876-322-8,
- Oliver, Roland Anthony, & Fage, J. D., Journal of African History. Volume 10. Published by: Cambridge University Press. 1969
- The African archaeological review, Volumes 17–18. Published by: Plenum Press, 2000
- Ajayi, J. F. Ade & Crowder, Michael, History of West Africa, Volume 1. Published by: Longman, 1985. ISBN 0-582-64683-9
- Peter Malcolm Holt, The Indian Sub-continent, south-East Asia, Africa and the Muslim West. Volume 2, Part 1. Published by: Cambridge University Press. 1977. ISBN 0-521-29137-2
- Page, Willie F., Encyclopedia of African history and culture: African kingdoms (500 to 1500). Volume 2. Published by: Facts on File. 2001. ISBN 0-8160-4472-4
- Ham, Anthony, West Africa. Published by: Lonely Planet. 2009. ISBN 1-74104-821-4, ISBN 978-1-74104-821-6
- Mwakikagile, Godfrey, Ethnic Diversity and Integration in the Gambia. Page 224
- Richard, François G., "Recharting Atlantic encounters. Object trajectories and histories of value in the Siin (Senegal) and Senegambia". Archaeological Dialogues 17 (1) 1–27. Cambridge University Press 2010
- Diop, Samba, The Wolof Epic: From Spoken Word to Written Text. "The Epic of Ndiadiane Ndiaye"
- Two studies on ethnic group relations in Africa – Senegal, The United Republic of Tanzania. Pages 14–15. UNESCO. 1974
- Galvan, Dennis Charles, The State Must Be Our Master of Fire: How Peasants Craft Culturally Sustainable Development in Senegal. Berkeley, University of California Press, 2004
- Klein, Martin A., Islam and Imperialism in Senegal Sine-Saloum, 1847–1914, Edinburgh University Press (1968)
- Colvin, Lucie Gallistel, Historical Dictionary of Senegal. Scarecrow Press/ Metuchen. NJ – London (1981) ISBN 0-8108-1885-X
- Sonko Godwin, Patience, Leaders of Senegambia Region, Reactions To European Infiltration 19th–20th Century. Sunrise Publishers Ltd – The Gambia (1995) ISBN 9983-86-002-3
- Sonko Godwin, Patience, Ethnic Groups of The Senegambia Region, A Brief History. p. 32, Third Edition. Sunrise Publishers Ltd – The Gambia (2003). ASIN B007HFNIHS
- Clark, Andrew F., & Philips, Lucie Colvin, Historical Dictionary of Senegal. Second Edition (1994)
- Portions of this article were translated from the French language Wikipedia article fr:Sérères, 2008-07-08 and August 2011.
- Abbey, M T Rosalie Akouele, "Customary Law and Slavery in West Africa", Trafford Publishing (2011), pp. 481–482, ISBN 1-4269-7117-6
- Bulletin de la Société de géographie, Volume 26. Société de Géographie (1855), pp. 35 – 36. (retrieved 7 March 2025)
- Marty, Paul, L'Islám en Mauritanie et au Sénégal. E. Leroux (1916), p. 49
- Maury, Alfred, Rapports à la Soc. de géogr, Volume 1. (1855). p. 25 (retrieved 7 March 2025)
- Asante, Molefi Kete; Mazama, Ama; Encyclopedia of African Religion, SAGE Publications (2008), p. 606-7, ISBN 9781506317861 (retrieved 2 March 2025)
