= Ellerson =

Ellerson is a surname. Notable people with the surname include:

- Beti Ellerson, American filmmaker and activist
- Gary Ellerson (born 1963), American football player and radio host
- Rich Ellerson (born 1953), American football player and coach

== See also ==
- Ellenson
