= Yandé Codou Sène =

Senegalese singer

- Yandé Codou Sène from La griotte de Senghor, a documentary by Angèle Diabang Brener (2008)

Background information
- Also known as: Yande Codou Sene
- Born: Yandé Codou Sène; 1932; Somb, in Senegal
- Died: July 15, 2010 Gandiaye, Senegal
- Genres: Njuup, World music, Traditional music, Mbalax
- Occupations: Singer, griot
- Years active: Active since 1947. Big break in 1995 – 2010

Yandé Codou Sène (also Yande Codou Sene) was a Senegalese singer from the Serer ethnic group. She was born in 1932 at Somb in the Sine-Saloum delta and died on July 15, 2010, at Gandiaye in Sénégal. She was the official griot of president Léopold Sédar Senghor. Most of her music is in the Serer language.

== Career ==
Yandé Codou sings in the old Serer tradition and have had a significant impact on Senegambian music as well as artists including Youssou N'Dour whom she has inspired immensely. Although she has been singing since she was a child and have had a profound effect on Senegambia's music scene, she did not record her first album (Night Sky in Sine Saloum) until she was aged 65. Her first recording debut on an album "Gainde" was in 1995 that she shared with Youssou N'Dour in which she received rave reviews. In that same year, her vocals were showcased on the full-length album Youssou N'Dour Presents Yandé Codou Sène. RootsWorld described her as someone who:

"can move mountains with her positively poetic voice."

In Safi Faye's Mossane (a 1996 film), Yandé's powerful vocals received rave reviews whose song in the film is associated with the evocation of the Serer Pangool (ancestral spirits and Serer Saints in the Serer religion).

President Senghor who is famous for adopting the African griot technique of "naming" in his poems is adopted from the Serer tradition as in his poem "Aux tirailleurs Sénégalais morts pour la France." Yandé Codou who is proficient in this technique used a similar technique in the funeral of President Senghor.

== Albums ==
=== Yandé Codou Sène, Night Sky in Sine Saloum, 1997 ===
==== Tracks ====
- Salmon Faye (sang in a cappella)
- Gainde
- Keur Maang Codou
- Bofia Tigue Waguene
- Salmon Faye
- Gnaikha Gniore Ndianesse
- Natangue
- Keur Mang Codou

== Filmography ==
- Yandé Codou Sène, Diva Sérère, documentary film by Laurence Gavron, 2008
- Yandé Codou, la griotte de Senghor, documentary film by Angèle Diabang Brener, 2008
- Safi Faye's Mossane, 1996
- Joseph Gaï Ramaka's Karmen Geï, 2001
- Ousmane Sembene's Faat Kine, 2001
