= Ndaw =

Ndaw (also N'daw, Ndow or Ndao ) is a typical Gambian and Senegalese patronym of the Serer people. They are the same people but because the French colonised Senegal and the British colonised the Gambia, they are spelt differently but pronounced the same way. This surname is also common among the Wolof people, but it is mainly due to Wolof absorption of Serer culture, and Wolof people having Serer ancestry.

People surnamed Ndaw, N'daw, Ndow or Ndao include:

- Abdoul Aziz Ndaw (1922–2011), Senegalese politician and diplomat
- Alassane Ndao (born 1996), Senegalese footballer
- Baba Ndaw Seck (born 1995), Senegalese footballer
- Bah Ndaw (born 1950), Malian military officer and politician, President of Mali
- Guirane N'Daw, Senegalese footballer
- Harriet Ndow (1926–2019), Gambian pedagogue
- Lamine Ndao (born 1994), Senegalese footballer
- Modou Ndow (born 2000), Gambian footballer
- Moussa N'Daw (born 1968), Senegalese footballer
- Mustapha Ndaw (born 1981), Gambian footballer
- Pape N'Daw (born 1993), Senegalese footballer
- Sirra Wally Ndow-Njie, Gambian politician
