= Dour =

Dour can refer to:

Places

- Dour, Belgium, a municipality in Belgium
- River Dour, a river in England
- Ad-Dawr (also known as Al-Dour), a town in Iraq
- Ed-Dur (also known as Al Dour and Ad Dour), archeological site in the United Arab Emirates

Other

- dour, a personality type characterized by excessive seriousness
- Dour (TV serial), Pakistani television series
- Dour (web series), Bangladeshi streaming series
- Dawr (also spelled dour), a genre of Arabic vocal music
- USS Dour (AM-223), Admirable-class minesweeper

== See also ==
- Daur (disambiguation)
- Dours, a commune in France
- N'Dour, typical Gambian and Senegalese patronym
