= Polha Andrea =

Ivorian actress (born 1994)

Gouré Andrea Polha Eudoxie Dry
- Born: February 15, 1994 (age 32); Abidjan

Polha Andrea (born February 15, 1994, in Abidjan) is an Ivorian Actor and television columnist. She is best known for playing the role of "Jessica Gradel" in the Senegalese series Impact.
