= Lehar region =

Area of Senegal

The Lehar (Serer & Laalaa : Laah or Laa, other variants : Lâ, Léhar, Laha or Laha ) is an area in the western part of Senegal, located in north of Thies.

The Lehar has around 18 villages including : Baam, Bapat, Bargaro, Bësia, Bicoona, Duuñë, Gogon, Haak, Jalkin, Jëëfuñ, Joy, Kaadaan, Kii, Kolobaan, Pambaal, Sowaaboon, Tuubi and Yindën. It is inhabited by the Serer people particularly the Laalaa people (a sub-group of the Serers). Their language Laalaa is closely related to Noon (the language of the Noon people). The Catholic congregation of Ursulines was established there in 1981.

== History ==
Close to the pre-colonial Kingdom of Baol, this region was ruled by the Joof family for several centuries. In the 13th century, Maad Ndaah Njemeh Joof was the king (Maad) of Laah. Many of his descendants went on to hold this title including his grandson Maad Xole Joof (né: Xole Njuug Juuf (King of Paataar, (the conqueror and Teigne of Baol)). The Joof family that had ruled the pre-colonial Kingdoms of Sine and Saloum from the 14th to the 20th century comes from the line of Patar Kholleh.

== See also ==
- Lamane Jegan Joof
- Tukar
- Thiès Region
- Geography of Senegal
