= Lobé Ndiaye =

Senegalese writer and documentary filmmaker

Nancee Oku Bright
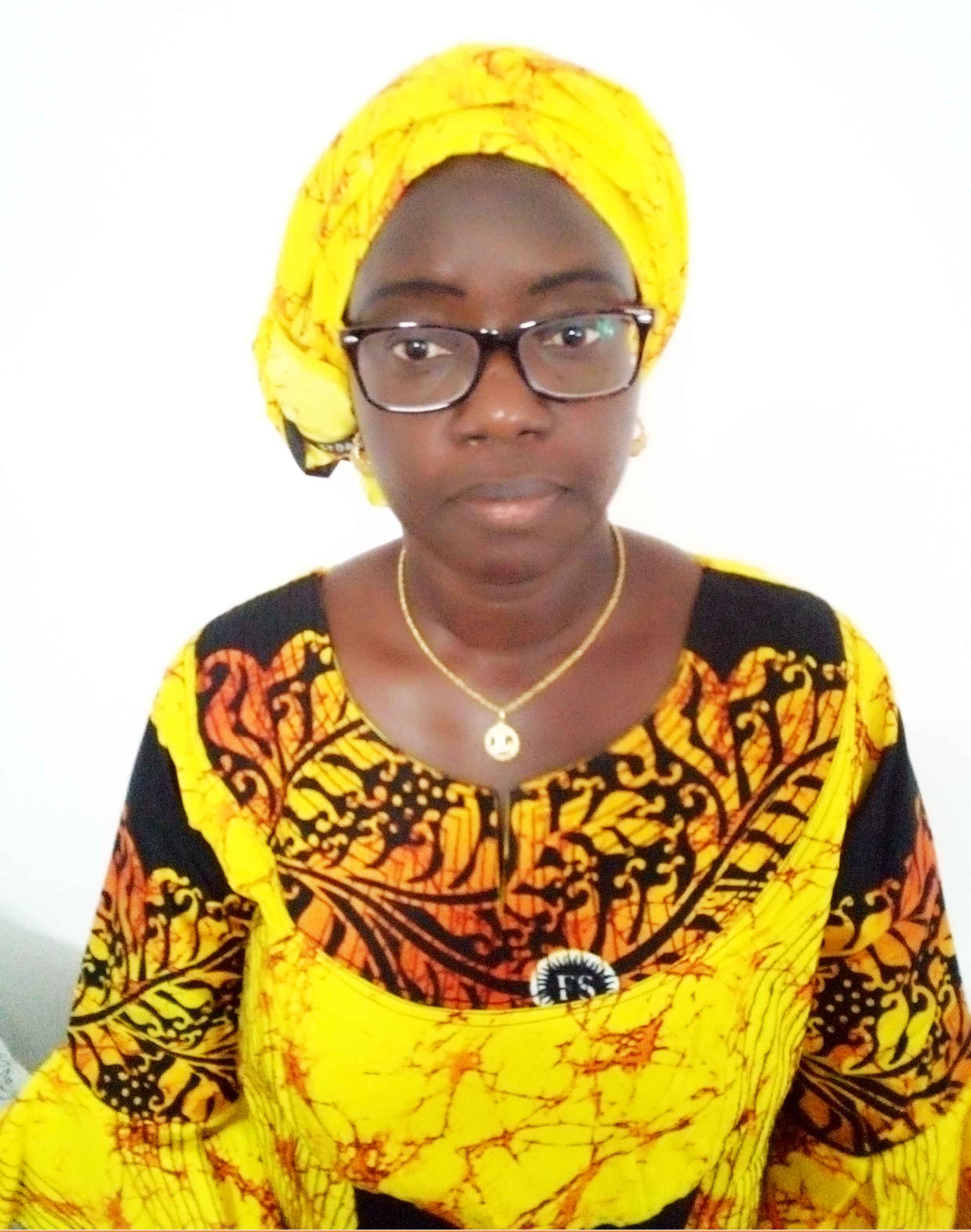
- Born: 8 September 1971 (age 54); Dakar
- Citizenship: Senegalese
- Occupations: documentary filmmaker; writer
- Known for: La femme lionne (The Woman Lioness)
- Notable work: Sirènes de la nuit, 2016; Une perle en éclats, L'Harmattan, 2017
- Awards: Dada Gbêhanzin Award

Lobé Ndiaye (Dakar, 8 September 1971) is a Senegalese writer and documentary filmmaker. She won the Dada Gbêhanzin Award in 2019.

== Novels ==
- Sirènes de la nuit, 2016
- Une perle en éclats, L'Harmattan, 2017

== Films ==
- La femme lionne (The Woman Lioness), 2018
