= Daur =

Daur or Dahur may refer to:

- Daur people, a sub-ethnic group mostly living in Inner Mongolia, China
- Daur language, a Mongolic language primarily spoken by the Daur people
- Dawar (Pashtun tribe), a Pashtun tribe in North Waziristan, Pakistan
- Daughter, sometimes abbreviated "Daur." in older census data

== Places ==
- Daur, Pakistan, a town in the Pakistani province of Sindh
- Khentei-Daur Highlands, Far Eastern Russia
- Dahur, Iran, a village in South Khorasan Province, Iran
- Ad-Dawr, a town in Saladin Governorate, Iraq
- Al-Daur District, Saladin Governorate, Iraq

== People with the given name ==
- Daur Zantaria (1953–2001), Abkhaz writer and journalist
- Daur Tarba (born 1959), Minister for Agriculture of Abkhazia
- Daur Arshba (born 1962), head of the Presidential Administration of Abkhazia
- Daur Akhvlediani (1964–1993), Abkhaz footballer
- Daur Kobakhia (born 1970), Chairman of the State Committee for Customs of Abkhazia
- Daur Kurmazia (born 1974), Minister for Taxes and Fees of Abkhazia
- Daur Kvekveskiri (born 1998), Russian footballer

== People with the surname ==
- Caroline Daur (born 1995), German fashion blogger

== See also ==
- Dour (disambiguation)
- Aaj Ka Daur (lit. 'Modern era'), a 1985 Indian Hindi-language film
