= Selbe: One Among Many =

1982 Senegalese short film

- Directed by: Safi Faye
- Produced by: Safi Faye Films
- Cinematography: Papa Moetar Ndoye
- Edited by: Andrée Daventure
- Release date: 1982
- Running time: 30 min.
- Country: Senegal
- Languages: Wolof; French

Selbe: One Among Many (originally as Selbé et tant d'autres, is a 1982 Senegalese documentary short directed by Safi Faye and produced by Pierre Hoffmann for Faye Films.

The film received positive reviews and won several awards at international film festivals.
