= Thiaw =

Thiaw is a common surname among the Serer people of West Africa (Senegal and the Gambia). Notable people with the surname include:

- Daniel Thiaw (1937–2018), Senegalese sprinter
- Ibrahim Thiaw (born 1957), Mauritianian public servant
- Issa Thiaw (born 1992), Senegalese football coach and former player
- Issa Laye Thiaw (1943–2017), Senegalese historian, theologian and author on Serer culture
- Malick Thiaw (born 2001), German football player
- Mohamed Thiaw (born 1995), Senegalese football player
- Pape Thiaw (born 1981), Senegalese football coach and former player
- Rama Thiaw (born 1978), Senegalese filmmaker and screenwriter
