= Dione (Serer surname) =

Dione (following its French spelling in Senegal) is a typical Serer surname. In English speaking Gambia (where the Serers are also present), it is spelled Jon.

Notable people with this name include:

- Maysa Waaly Dione (king of Sine from 1350 to 1370)
