= Marie Samuel Njie =

- Born: Early 1970s
- Origin: Bathurst (now Banjul), The Gambia
- Genres: Traditional Senegambian music
- Occupations: Singer; Composer; Griot
- Years active: Active since childhoold, popular from the 1940s

Marie Samuel Njie was a renowned Gambian musician and singer who gained popularity from the 1940, but especially the 50s, until her death in the early 1970s.

== Life and family ==
Marie Samuel Njie was an important griot singer and cultural icon in her home country, The Gambia. She came from a family that produced several major griot singers. Her songs were accompanied by a xalam, calabash, and sabar, and were mainly about social and political issues as well as everyday life.

She regularly entertained the high society of Bathurst (now Banjul). She was also active in the 1950s in the Gambia Democratic Party, and later performed at party meetings of the United Party of Pierre Sarr N'Jie.

Her son Pap Touray or Paps Touray (c. 1944 – 19 May 2007) was also a successful musician from the 1960s and a former mentor of the Senegalese singer Youssou N'Dour. He was a co-founder and lead singer of the Super Eagles and Ifang Bondi ( de ) bands, as well as a composer and songwriter. Her other son, Abdoulie Mbye, commonly known as Abdoulie "Efri" Mbye or Efri Mbye, nicknamed Everybody Mbye, ? — 11 June 2019) was a historian, narrator and singer. Marie Samuel Njie had a major influence in both her children's singing careers. She was married to Goreh Mbye. Through her father Modou Njie, she was second cousin to the renowned Gambian historian and Pan-Africanist Alieu Ebrima Cham Joof via her paternal grandmother, the Serer princess, Lingeer Ndombuur Joof (Alieu Ebrima Cham Joof's great aunt), and a member of the Joof royal family of Sine, Saloum and Baol, as well as a member of the Njie royal family of Jolof. Her mother Rohey Njie was the daughter of Chaby Nyang, sister of the 19th century Gambian elder and renowned exorcist and seer Biram Camonge Nyang, himself a relative of Cham Joof. Although known as a griot, ancestrally, just like Youssou N'Dour, she was of royal blood. Some of the legendary traditional female singers of her generation included the late Sosseh Jange; Yaham Nyang (commonly known as Ya Mundow Nyang or Yamoundow Nyang); and Ya Mundow Jobe (or Yamoundow Jobe), wife of renowned Gambian oral historian and xalam player Doudou Nying (commonly known as Dodou Nying Kol Yandeh or Dodou Nying Koliyandeh)—a regular on Radio Gambia and Radio Senegal's joint weekly history programme Chossani Senegambia from the 1970s.

Marie Samuel Nice was a singing griot legend who composed songs for social harmony, social living, high society, politics, patrons of the arts, people's hobbies and life.

— The Point (Gambia) by Oko Drammeh,
