= Dieye =

Dieye or Dièye is a surname which may refer to:

- Abdou Dieye (born 1988), French footballer
- Abdoulaye Mar Dieye, Senegalese United Nations bureaucrat
- Cheikh Bamba Dièye (born 1965), Senegalese politician
- Matar Dieye (born 1998), Senegalese footballer
- Ouleye Dieye (born 1986), Senegalese footballer
- Lingeer Ngoné Dièye, 17th century Queen and Queen Mother of Cayor and Baol
