= Oulimata Sarr =

Senegalese politician

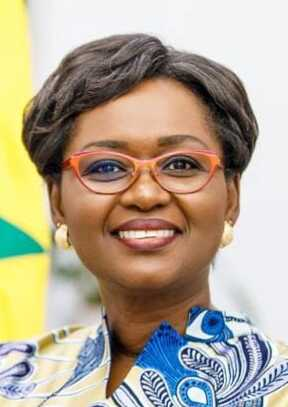
- Born: Dakar, Senegal
- Occupations: Former Minister of Economy, Planning and Cooperation of Senegal
- Website: Sarr Foundation; Legacy Farms; Teassé Website

Oulimata Sarr (born 1970) is a Senegalese politician who served as Minister of Economy, Planning and Cooperation of Senegal from September 2022 to October 2023, becoming the first woman to be appointed to this ministerial position.

She is also the former Chair of the National Committee of the Extractive Industries Transparency Initiative (EITI) in February 2024. For more than three years, she was Regional Director of the UN Women office in Dakar, a United Nations entity mandated to promote gender equality and empower women, operating in West and Central Africa.

== Early life and education ==
Oulimata Sarr was born on January 6, 1970, in Dakar, Senegal but studied in Montreal, Canada. She graduated from the École des Hautes études Commerciales de Montréal (HEC Montréal) with a bachelor's degree in 1992, and after a period of further study at the University of Bedfordshire in Britain, graduated with a Master of Business Administration in 2002.

== Professional career ==
She began her career at Ernst & Young in auditing in Senegal, spending a decade at the International Finance Corporation, a member institution of the World Bank Group, where she contributed to private sector development through investment and advisory activities. Her professional assignments took her to Johannesburg, Nairobi and Bujumbura, allowing her to gain solid experience in finance, development and emerging markets.

From 1993 to 2005, she served as Chief Financial Officer (CFO) of the airline Interair South Africa based in Johannesburg, South Africa.She joined the United Nations in 2013, working for UN Women as Regional Advisor on Women's Economic Empowerment, where she oversaw economic and gender equality programs in 24 countries.

In 2019, she became Regional Director, then Deputy Regional Director of UN Women.

In February 2024, Sarr was appointed Chair of the National Committee of the Extractive Industries Transparency Initiative (EITI) in Senegal.

== Ministerial career ==
In 2022, Oulimata Sarr was appointed Minister of Economy, Planning, and Cooperation from September 17, 2022, to October 11, 2023 within the Ba Government. This is the first time in Senegal that a woman has held this ministerial position.

== Entrepreneurial career and social engagement ==
In 2017, Sarr was invited by Vital Voices to join the Global Ambassadors Program as a mentor for women entrepreneurs around the world. She recently joined 75 African women as the founding member of Women Investment Club of Senegal which was set up in 2016 to provide long-term capital to women entrepreneurs in Senegal. Sarr has been the Jury President of the Cartier Women's Initiative Awards business plan competition for Sub Saharan Africa and has served on the Advisory Board of UnitLife.

Ms. Sarr is the founder of Our Legacy Foundation and Legacy Farms, initiatives dedicated to transforming agriculture through climate-resilient practices and promoting economic opportunities for women in Senegal. She is also the founder of Teassé, a tea brand that promotes quality, expertise, and well-being.

== Personal life ==
Oulimata Sarr is the sister of Abdourahmane Sarr.

== Other activities ==
- ECOWAS Bank for Investment and Development (EBID), Ex-Officio Member of the Board of Governors (since 2022)
- International Monetary Fund (IMF), Ex-Officio Alternate Member of the Board of Governors (since 2022)

== Recognition ==
- 2024: Named an Officer of the National Order of the Lion (Senegal)
