= Annette Kouamba Matondo =

Congolese film director and journalist

- Occupation: film director . journalist . blogger

Annette Kouamba Matondo is a film director, journalist and blogger from the Republic of the Congo.

== Career ==
Matondo is editor of La Nouvelle République, a newspaper based in Brazzaville. Her first film, On n'oublie pas, on pardonne, commemorates the disappearance of 353 refugees in 1999 from the port in Brazzaville. In it the actress Sylvie Dyclos-Pomos writes a play based on the event. The title uses a phrase associated with Nelson Mandela. The film was described by film-maker Beti Ellerson as "cathartic". Her second film, De quoi avons-nous peur? raises awareness of censorship and self-censorship in journalism. In a third film, Au-delà de la souffrance, she draws attention to the explosion on 4 March 2012 at an ammunition depot in Mpila.

== Filmography ==
- On n'oublie pas, on pardonne (2010)
- De quoi avons-nous peur ? (2010)
- Au-delà de la souffrance (2012)

== Awards ==
- Best Documentary: De quoi avons-nous peur ? – Tazama Festival Festival (2010)
- Audience Award: On n'oublie pas, on pardonne – Festival Ciné Sud de Cozes (2011)
