= Mossane =

1996 film

- Directed by: Safi Faye
- Written by: Safi Faye
- Starring: Magou Seck
- Cinematography: Jürgen Jürges
- Edited by: Andrée Davanture
- Music by: Yandé Codou Sène
- Release date: May 1996
- Running time: 105 minutes
- Country: Senegal
- Language: Wolof

Mossane is a 1996 Senegalese drama film directed by Safi Faye. It was screened in the Un Certain Regard section at the 1996 Cannes Film Festival. Unlike some of Faye's earlier films which use a documentary style, Mossane is purely fictional.

== Plot ==
Mossane (Magou Seck) is a beautiful 14-year-old girl from a rural Serer village, beloved by many including her own brother and Fara, a poor university student. Although she has long been promised in marriage to the wealthy Diogaye, Mossane defies her parents' wishes and falls in love with Fara. On her wedding day, she refuses to marry Diogaye and tragedy ensues.

== Cast ==
- Abou Camara as Oncle Baak
- Moussa Cissé
- Mbaye Diagne
- Alpha Diouf as Ngor
- Alioune Konaré as Fara
- Daouda Lam
- Ibou N'Dong
- Isseu Niang as Mere Mingue Diouf
- Magou Seck as Mossane
- Medoune Seck
- Guèye Seynabou
- Moustapha Yade as Samba
