= Brazzaville arms dump blasts =

2012 deadly explosions in Congo

- Brazzaville (Republic of the Congo) Location of arms dump
- Date: 4 March 2012
- Time: Around 8:00 AM WAT
- Location: Brazzaville, Republic of the Congo; 04°14′33″S 15°17′42″E
- Deaths: 300+
- Injuries: 2,500+

On 4 March 2012, a series of blasts occurred at an army arms dump in Brazzaville, the capital of the Republic of the Congo. At least 300 people were killed by the explosions. Additional bodies were said to be "unfindable." Among the dead were six Chinese workers from a Beijing Construction Engineering Group work site close to the armoury. Interior Minister Raymond Mboulou said that nearby hospitals were overflowing with injuries, with many wounded lying in hallways due to lack of space. Total injuries exceeded 2,500. More than 121,000 people were left homeless and 672 million dollars in damages were done. One survivor described the event as feeling like "the apocalypse;" others described it as "like a tsunami" or "earthquake".

== Explosions ==
=== Brazzaville ===
Explosions at the arms dump started around 8:00 a.m. local time (07:00 UTC) in the densely populated arrondissement of Ouenzé, in the north of Brazzaville. The arms dump is situated in Mpila, a neighborhood astride the arrondissements of Ouenzé and Talangaï. The blasts continued for several hours with five significant blasts and many smaller ones occurring. The last notable explosion happened around 1:00 p.m. Defence Minister Charles Zacharie Bowao went on national television to urge calm. "The explosions that you have heard don't mean there is a war or a coup d'état ... It [was] an incident caused by a fire at the munitions depot," he said. Many people were trapped in collapsed buildings. Among the destroyed buildings were the St. Louis Catholic church and a smaller evangelical church, both of which were holding services at the time of the blasts. Buildings within a half-kilometer of the military camp were completely flattened by the explosions.

The president of the country, Denis Sassou-Nguesso, had a residence near the depot, but he was not there when the series of explosions started.

=== Kinshasa ===
The force of the blasts was felt for several miles and affected residents of Kinshasa, across the Congo River in the Democratic Republic of the Congo. Widespread panic ensued in both Brazzaville and Kinshasa, as many people thought armed conflict had started. The government of the Democratic Republic sent military personnel to the banks of the Congo River until it became clear that war had not broken out.

In Kinshasa, roofs were damaged and windows broken. The glass of some buildings on the Boulevard du 30 Juin in La Gombe was broken. According to journalists, five strong explosions could be heard in Kinshasa.

== Aftermath ==
In the aftermath of the blasts, the streets of Brazzaville were covered with metal and other debris. Fires spread through the city, burning homes and businesses. The area of the blasts was sealed off by police forces. By the evening, the main fire was out but isolated homes were still on fire. A curfew was put in effect. Many children were found wandering the streets and were put in temporary government care until their parents or next of kin could be located. Congolese television tried to reunite the children with their parents. The authorities opened two churches and a covered market for the homeless as shelters. Rescue operations near the depot were more difficult because of continuing smaller explosions.

Fires continued to ravage Brazzaville on 5 March, threatening to ignite a second arms depot with more substantial munitions. Small blasts continued throughout the day. On 5 March, bodies were still being retrieved from the cordoned zone, and the smell of decaying bodies began to emerge just outside the cordoned zone. However, in the city center and southern neighborhoods of Brazzaville life returned to normal.

Within 24 hours, American and French officials met with Republic of the Congo officials to discuss aid efforts. French and Russian firefighters joined in efforts to extinguish the fires and France immediately sent a shipment of aid. The Democratic Republic of the Congo sent medical kits and a delegation to the Republic of the Congo. The World Health Organization sent 2.5 metric tons of medicine. The Red Cross set up refugee camps, serving 3,000 people U.N. Secretary-General Ban Ki-moon expressed his condolences to the families of the bereaved and to the government and people of Congo. Other offers of help and words of condolence came in from around the world. The United Nations Mine Action Service (UNMAS) led an emergency response and established the United Nations Mine Action Team (UNMAT) in full cooperation with the United Nations Humanitarian Coordinator and other actors on the ground including the Congolese Armed Forces.

As of 7 March, there was still no effective rescue effort. The Red Cross was barred from entering the blast zone because of the risk of further explosions, and soldiers allowed in were concentrating on extinguishing the flames. After inspection, unexploded munitions were found spread over a huge area around the depot.

As a result of the accident, the government decided to move all military camps out of the capital, a promise which had also been made after an explosion in 2009. There are at least five barracks and munitions depots situated in Brazzaville. On 8 March, the Republic of Congo announced it would pay 3 million CFA francs (US$6,051) to the family of each victim.

UN experts, foreign armies, and NGOs helped clean up the blast site. As of early April, it was reported that 16 tons of munitions had been collected and destroyed.

On 10 September 2013, six soldiers were sentenced to 15 years in jail for causing the short circuit which led to the fire. Twenty-six others were acquitted of the disaster. The former deputy secretary general was sentenced to five years of hard labor for the disaster by the National Security Council.

== Cause ==
According to state officials, the blasts originated at the arms depot in the Regiment Blinde and were caused by a fire. The fire, which was caused by a short circuit, ignited a store of tank shells.

The location of the military camps was cited as a factor contributing to the death toll. There are at least five barracks or arms depots in Brazzaville, and after the explosion the government promised to move the depots outside the city. The same promise had been made three years earlier after another explosion, but the depots were not moved at that time.

== Cholera outbreak ==
In early April, a cholera outbreak was reported. The poor hygienic and sanitary conditions in the sites for the displaced people and the ongoing rains helped spread the disease. The covered market in Nkombo in northern Brazzaville and the Sacred Heart Cathedral in downtown were the worst hit sites. Together the two places provided refuge for 11,000 of the 14,000 displaced people due to the explosions.

== In culture ==
Film-maker Annette Kouamba Matondo drew attention to the tragedy in her 2012 work Au-delà de la souffrance.

== See also ==
- 2007 Maputo arms depot explosion
- Lagos armoury explosion
- 2021 Bata explosions
