= Lah =

Lah may refer to:

- Lah (surname)
- Lithium aluminium hydride
- Lah, a pre-Islamic Arabian deity
- Lah, Victoria, Australia
- Lah, Yaba, a village in Nayala Province, Burkina Faso
- Lah, Kona, a village in Kona Department, Mouhoun Province, Burkina Faso
- A Singlish/Manglish term used for emphasis or reassurance
