= Ellenson =

Ellenson is a surname. Notable people with the surname include:

- David Ellenson (born 1947), American rabbi and theologian
- Gene Ellenson (1921–1995), American football player and coach and athletics administrator
- Henry Ellenson (born 1997), American basketball player

== See also ==
- Ellefson
