= Yandé Codou, la griotte de Senghor =

- Directed by: Angèle Diabang
- Screenplay by: Angèle Diabang Brener
- Produced by: Karoninka Africalia Belgium
- Cinematography: Florian Bouchet Fabacary Assymby Coly
- Edited by: Yannick Leroy
- Music by: Yandé Codou Sène, Wasis Diop, Youssou N'Dour
- Release date: 2008
- Running time: 52 minutes
- Countries: Belgium; Senegal

Yandé Codou, la griotte de Senghor is a 2008 Belgian-Senegalese documentary film written and directed by Angèle Diabang Brener and starring Yandé Codou Sène — two years prior to her death. The documentary is a portrayal of the life and work of Yandé Codou Sène, official griot to President Léopold Sédar Senghor, and one of the most influential Senegalese and Senegambian artists for decades despite not recording her first album until the age of sixty-five. The music is provided by Yandé Codou Sène, Wasis Diop and Youssou N'Dour.

== Synopsis ==
The griotte Yandé Codou Sène, who is now around 80 years old, is one of the last representatives of the Serer polyphonic poetry. This documentary, shot over four years, is an intimate portrait of the diva that traveled through the history of Senegal by the side of one of the country's legendary figures, poet President, Léopold Sédar Senghor. A sweet and bitter story about greatness, glory and the passage of time.

== Awards ==
- Festival de Cine de Dakar 2008: Audience Award for Best Documentary (6 December 2008)
