= Safi Faye =

Ethnologist and film director (1943–2023)

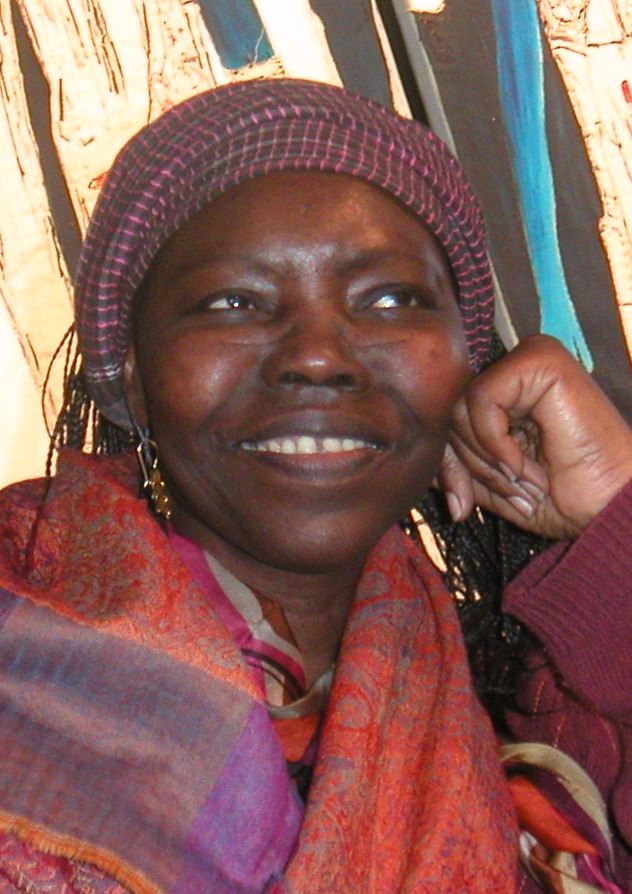
- Safi Faye, in 2004
- Born: November 22, 1943; Dakar, Senegal
- Died: February 22, 2023 (aged 79); Paris, France
- Education: École normal de Rufisque, University of Paris
- Occupations: Film director, ethnologist
- Years active: 1972–2023
- Notable work: Kaddu Beykat, Mossane
- Children: 1
- Awards: Un Certain Regard

Safi Faye (November 22, 1943 – February 22, 2023) was a Senegalese film director and ethnologist. She was the first African woman to direct a commercially distributed feature film, Kaddu Beykat, which was released in 1975. She has directed several documentary and fiction films focusing on rural life in Senegal.

== Early life and education ==
Safi Faye was born in 1943 in Dakar, Senegal, to an aristocratic Serer family. Her parents, the Fayes, were from Fad'jal, a village south of Dakar. She attended the École normal de Rufisque, or Normal School, in Rufisque and receiving her teaching certificate in 1962 or 1963, began teaching in Dakar.

In 1966 she went to the Dakar Festival of Negro Arts and met French ethnologist and filmmaker Jean Rouch. He encouraged her to use film making as an ethnographic tool. She had an acting role in his 1971 film Petit à petit. Faye has said that she dislikes Rouch's film but that working with him enabled her to learn about filmmaking and cinéma-vérité.

In the 1970s she studied ethnology at the École pratique des hautes études and then at the Lumière Film School. She supported herself by working as a model, an actor and in film sound effects. In 1979, she received a PhD in ethnology from the University of Paris. From 1979 to 1980, Faye studied video production in Berlin and was a guest lecturer at the Free University of Berlin. She received a further degree in ethnology from the Sorbonne in 1988.

== Filmmaking ==
About Faye's work, the film programmer and scholar Janaína Oliveira has written:

"Since the beginning of her career, Faye has been driven by a desire to speak about her community, for her community, and, above all, with her community. In this case, the prepositions do matter. They guide both the reasons that led her to study ethnology in France and her appropriation of cinema as a means of expanding her research."

Almost all of Safi Faye's films (both documentary and fictive) focus heavily on the role and struggles of women in rural Africa. She has, however, rebuked the idea that they exclusively center women and states "Women alone cannot live in Africa. Women live in a community, and I cannot eliminate the community."

Faye's directorial debut, in which she also acted, was a 1972 short called La Passante (The Passerby), drawn from her experiences as a foreign woman in Paris. It follows a woman (Faye) walking down a street and noticing the reactions of men nearby. This was followed by Revanche in 1973, which was made with other students in Paris and depicts a crazed man's attempt to climb the Pont Neuf.

Faye's first feature film was Kaddu Beykat (1975), which means The Voice of the Peasant in Wolof and was known internationally as Letter from My Village or News from My Village.

In 1979 came Fad'jal, an ethnographic work uncovering the history of Faye's home village.

Faye's 1983 documentary film Selbe: One Among Many follows a 39-year-old woman called Selbé who works to support her eight children since her husband has left their village to look for work. Selbé regularly converses with Faye, who remains off-screen, and describes her relationship with her husband and daily life in the village.

The last of her feature films was released in 1996. Titled Mossane, the film is in Wolof and was awarded the Un Certain Regard prize at the Cannes Film Festival.

== Prominent works ==
=== Kaddu Beykat ===
She obtained financial backing for Kaddu Beykat from the French Ministry of Cooperation. Released in 1975, it was the first feature film to be made by a Sub-Saharan African woman to be commercially distributed and gained international recognition for Faye. On its release it was banned in Senegal. In 1976 it won the FIPRESCI Prize from the International Federation of Film Critics (tied with Chhatrabhang) and the OCIC Award.

The film is her first to focus on the experiences of rural Senegalese and give particular voice to the women of such communities. It is also notable for the off-screen narration, delivered by Faye herself, which breaks from a more traditional authoritative male voice. Faye's voice, whether in narration or interview, is prominent in many of her films, including Fad'jal.

=== Mossane ===
This purely fictive work, released in 1996 but completed in 1990, follows a 14-year-old's battle against the expectation and traditions of her community and family. Promised since birth to an emigrant living in France, she instead falls in love with a poor student. Rejecting the arrangement on the day of her wedding, she flees the village and drowns.

Faye has said the story was inspired by “an African legend that stipulates that a girl of incredible beauty is born every other century...moss means beauty in the Serer language. It is a kind of beauty which is inaccessible to human beings.” Regarding the goal of the film the director has gone on to state "there is no moral to the story;" rather, it exists "to show how tradition and modernity currently confront each other in African reality."

The film features many ceremonies and rituals. While not taken entirely from reality they, along with other spiritual symbols represented in the film, are born out of Faye's own imagery. On this, filmmaker Beti Ellerson states "Faye's capacity to intermingle fact and fiction, ethnography and mythology is born out of her desire to visualize the history and experiences of her people."

Faye employed many cinéma-vérité techniques throughout the production, particularly in casting many of the community members of the village in which the Mossane was filmed.

== Personal life ==
Faye, who lived in Paris, had one daughter. She died there on February 22, 2023, at the age of 79.

== Filmography ==
- 1972: Passante (The Passerby)
- 1975: Kaddu Beykat (Letter from My Village)
- 1979: Fad'jal (Come and work)
- 1979: Goob na nu (The harvest is in)
- 1980: Man Sa Yay (I, Your Mother)
- 1981: Les âmes au soleil (Souls under the Sun)
- 1983: Selbe: One Among Many (or Selbe and So Many Others)
- 1983: 3 ans 5 mois (Three years five months)
- 1985: Racines noires (Black Roots)
- 1985: Elsie Haas, femme peintre et cinéaste d'Haiti (Elsie Haas, Haitian Woman Painter and Filmmaker)
- 1989: Tesito
- 1996: Mossane
