= Serer-Laalaa =

Part of the Serer ethnic group

The Serer-Laalaa or Laalaa are part of the Serer ethnic group of Senegambia (Senegal and the Gambia). They live in Laa (var : Lâ), the Léhar Region, which comprises eighteen villages north of Thies and whose inhabitants are Serer-Laalaa. Although the people are ethnically Serer, their language Laalaa (or Lehar) is not a dialect of the Serer-Sine language, but—like Saafi, Noon, Ndut and Palor, one of the Cangin languages.

== Other names ==
Serer-Lehar, Serer-Lehaar, Serer-Laalaa, Serer-Laal, Serer-Lala, Laalaa or just Serer.

== Culture ==
Their language, Laalaa or Lehar, is one of the Cangin languages, closely related to the Noon and Saafi languages, and more distantly related to Serer proper.

They are people who once practiced agro-pastoral activities. Nowadays, agricultural activities predominate their lives. Livestock has been virtually decimated by repeated droughts in the late 1990s. The Laalaa have a younger generation of many intellectuals, a typical Serer traite.

== Population ==
The number of speakers of their language is 12,000 in Senegal excluding the Gambia where they are also present. As part of the Serer ethnic group, they collectively make up the third largest ethnic group in Senegal numbering over 1.8 million. The Laalaa (also called Léhar) are mostly found in the north of Thies around the villages of Pambaal, Bargaro and Duuña.

They have about 18 villages namely: Baam, Bapat, Bargaro, Besi, Bicoona, Duuñë, Gogona, Haak, Jalkin, Jëëfuñ, Joy, Kaadaan, Kii, Kolobaan, Pambal, Sowaaboon, Tuuba and Yindën. The Laalaa are also found outside the region of Thies. A large Laalaa community migrated between 1984 and 1986 to Saal Ngeen in the Tambacounda Region.

== History ==
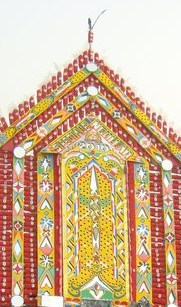
Symbol of the Ndut rite of passage in Serer religion.

== Religion ==
They practice the Serer religion which involves ancestor veneration, covering all dimensions of life, death and space. Some Serer-Laalaas are Christians or Muslims whose conversion is very recent (like most Serer converts to Islam). Both the Christian and Muslim groups mix it with Serer religion whilst the Ultra orthodox follow orthodox Serer religion.

== See also ==
=== Related peoples ===
- Serer people
- Serer-Noon
- Saafi people
- Niominka people
- Serer-Ndut people
- Palor people

== Notes ==
=== Bibliography ===
- Gambian Studies No. 17. “People of the Gambia. I. The Wolof. With notes on the Serer and Lebou” By David P. Gamble & Linda K. Salmon with Alhaji Hassan Njie. San Francisco 1985
- Senegambian Ethnic Groups: Common Origins and Cultural Affinities Factors and Forces of National Unity, Peace and Stability. By Alhaji Ebou Momar Taal. 2010
- Elisa Daggs. All Africa: All its political entities of independent or other status. Hasting House, 1970. ISBN 0-8038-0336-2, ISBN 978-0-8038-0336-7
