= Diène =

Diène is a typical Serer patronym in Senegal. It can also be a Serer first name for a female, which can be inherited as middle name from the mother. In English speaking Gambia, the variantes of this surname (also worn by the Serers) include Jein. People carrying this name include :

- Doudou Diène (born 1941), former United Nations Special Rapporteur.
- Louis Diène Faye (born 1936), anthropologist and author on Serer religion.
- For Laba Diène Ngom - the 19th century historical figure during the reign of Maad a Sinig Kumba Ndoffene Famak Joof, see Saltigue and the Battle of Fandane-Thiouthioune (also called the Battle of Somb).
