= Abdou Dieye =

French footballer (born 1988)

Personal information
- Full name: Abdourahmane Diéyé
- Date of birth: 14 February 1988 (age 38)
- Place of birth: Dreux, France
- Height: 1.81 m (5 ft 11 1/2 in)
- Position: Midfielder

Team information
- Current team: SC Cers-Portiragnes

Senior career*
Years	Team	Apps	(Gls)
2005–2011	Le Mans B	96	(27)
2006–2011	Le Mans UC	0	(0)
2009–2010	→ Rodez AF (loan)	33	(6)
2011–2012	Les Herbiers VF	9	(2)
2012–2013	Luçon VF	11	(0)
2013–2015	Rodez AF	31	(5)
2015–2016	AS Béziers	27	(7)
2016-2020	RCO Agde	55	(11)
2020-	SC Cers-Portiragnes		
- * Club domestic league appearances and goals

Abdourahmane Dieye (born 14 February 1988 in Dreux, France) is a French footballer, who currently plays for SC Cers-Portiragnes.

He played 16 matches for French Ligue 2 club Le Mans during the 2010–2011 season.
