= N'Dour =

N'Dour (also Ndure, Ndour, or Ndur) is a typical Gambian and Senegalese patronym of the Serer people. They are the same people but because the French colonised Senegal and the British colonised the Gambia, there are variations in spelling but pronounced the same way. They share the same surname with the 15th century Serer King of Saloum Maat Saloum Mbegani Ndour (reigned from 1494) also known as Mbegan Ndour.

People surnamed N'Dour/Ndure include :

- Aicha Ndour (born 2000), Senegalese basketball player
- Alassane N'Dour (born 1981), Senegalese football player
- Astou Ndour (born 1994), Spanish basketball player
- Cher Ndour (born 2004), Italian football player
- Youssou N'Dour (born 1959), Senegalese singer and percussionist
- Maurice Ndour (born 1992), Senegalese basketball player for Hapoel Jerusalem of the Israeli Basketball Premier League
- Viviane Ndour, Senegalese singer and sister-in-law of Youssou N'Dour
- Rumun Ndur, Nigerian-born Canadian hockey player

== Other ==
- N'Dour (JoJo's Bizarre Adventure), a fictional character appearing in JoJo's Bizarre Adventure
