= Diagne =

Diagne is a Senegalese surname, and may refer to:

- Abdoulaye Diagne-Faye (born 1978), Senegalese professional footballer
- Assane Diagne (1947–2013), Senegalese minister
- Blaise Diagne (1872–1934), Senegalese political leader
- Fama Diagne Sène (born 1969), Senegalese writer
- Mamadou Diagne (born 2003), Senegalese professional footballer
- Mbaye Diagne (1958–1994), Senegalese army officer
- Mbaye Diagne (footballer) (born 1991), Senegalese professional footballer
- Raoul Diagne (1910–2002), French football defender
- Souleymane Bachir Diagne (born 1955), Senegalese philosopher
