= Lah (surname) =

Lah is the surname of the following people:

- Alboury Lah (born 1966), football forward from Senegal
- Barbara Lah (born 1972), Italian triple jumper
- Kyung Lah (born 1971), South Korean-American journalist
- Michael Lah (1912–1995), American animator
- Nick Lah (born 1981), Australian rugby union footballer
- Pavla Jerina Lah (1915–2007) – Slovene surgeon and partisan
- Yusri Che Lah (born 1974), Malaysian football midfielder
