= Laalaa language =

Cangin language spoken in Senegal

Laalaa
- Lehar
- Laalaa
- Native to: Senegal
- Region: Thies
- Ethnicity: Serer-Laalaa
- Native speakers: 12,000 (2007)
- Language family: Niger–Congo?: Atlantic–Congo; Senegambian; Cangin; Noon-Laalaa; Laalaa

Language codes
- ISO 639-3: cae
- Glottolog: leha1242
- ELP: Lehar

Lehar or Laalaa (in their language) is one of the Cangin languages spoken in Senegal in the Laa Region (Lehar Region), north of Thies as well as the Tambacounda area. The speakers (the Serer-Laalaa) are ethnically Serers, however just like the Ndut, Palor, Saafi and Noon languages, they are closely related to each other than to the Serer-Sine language. The Lehar language which is closer to Noon, is part of the Niger–Congo family. The number of speakers based on 2002 figures were 10,925.

== Bibliography ==
- Papa Oumar Fall "The problematic classification of Seereer" Forschungskolloquium 'International Forschen' am 20. November 2010
- Papa Oumar Fall "Nominal classification and pronominal system in Laalaa"
- Papa Oumar Fall "Language classification: Seereer dialects or langues cangin" , African Linguistics Congress WOCAL6, Cologne 2009.
- Papa Oumar Fall, Contribution à la phonologie laalaa (Parler de Bargaro), Mémoire de Maîtrise, UCAD, Dakar, 2004–2005, 75 p.
- Papa Oumar Fall, Les pronoms laalaa, Mémoire de DEA, UCAD, Dakar, 2006, 55 p.
- Walter Pichl, The Cangin Group - A Language Group in Northern Senegal, Pittsburgh, PA : Institute of African Affairs, Duquesne University, Coll. African Reprint Series, 1966, vol. 20
