= Ellefson =

Ellefson is a surname. Notable people with the surname include:

- Art Ellefson (1932–2018), Canadian saxophonist
- Ben Ellefson (born 1996), American football player
- Christian Ellefson (1842–1925), American politician
- David Ellefson (born 1964), American musician
- Peter Ellefson, American trombonist and academic
- Ray Ellefson (1927–1994), American basketballer
