= Kaddu Beykat =

- Title card
- Directed by: Safi Faye
- Written by: Safi Faye
- Starring: Assane Faye; Maguette Gueye
- Narrated by: Safi Faye
- Cinematography: Patrick Fabry
- Edited by: André Davanture
- Production company: Safi
- Release dates: June 1976 (Berlin); October 20, 1976 (France)
- Running time: 90 minutes
- Country: Senegal
- Languages: Serer; French

Kaddu Beykat (Serer: "Voice of the Peasant"; also known as Lettre paysanne or Letter from My Village) is a 1975 Senegalese film directed by Safi Faye. It was the first feature film made by a Black African woman to be commercially distributed and brought international recognition for its director. Centred on a romance, it chronicles the daily lives of people in a rural Senegalese village.

== Plot ==
Ngor is a young man living in a Senegalese village who wishes to marry Coumba. Ongoing drought in the village has affected its crop of groundnuts and as a result, Ngor cannot afford the bride price for Coumba. He goes to Senegal's capital city, Dakar, to try to earn more money and is exploited there. He returns to the villagers and shares his experiences of the city with the other men. The story, which shows the daily lives of the villagers, is told in the form of a letter to a friend from a villager, voiced by Faye.

== Cast ==
- Assane Faye as Ngor
- Maguette Gueye as Coumba

== Background ==
Location of Fad'jal in Senegal

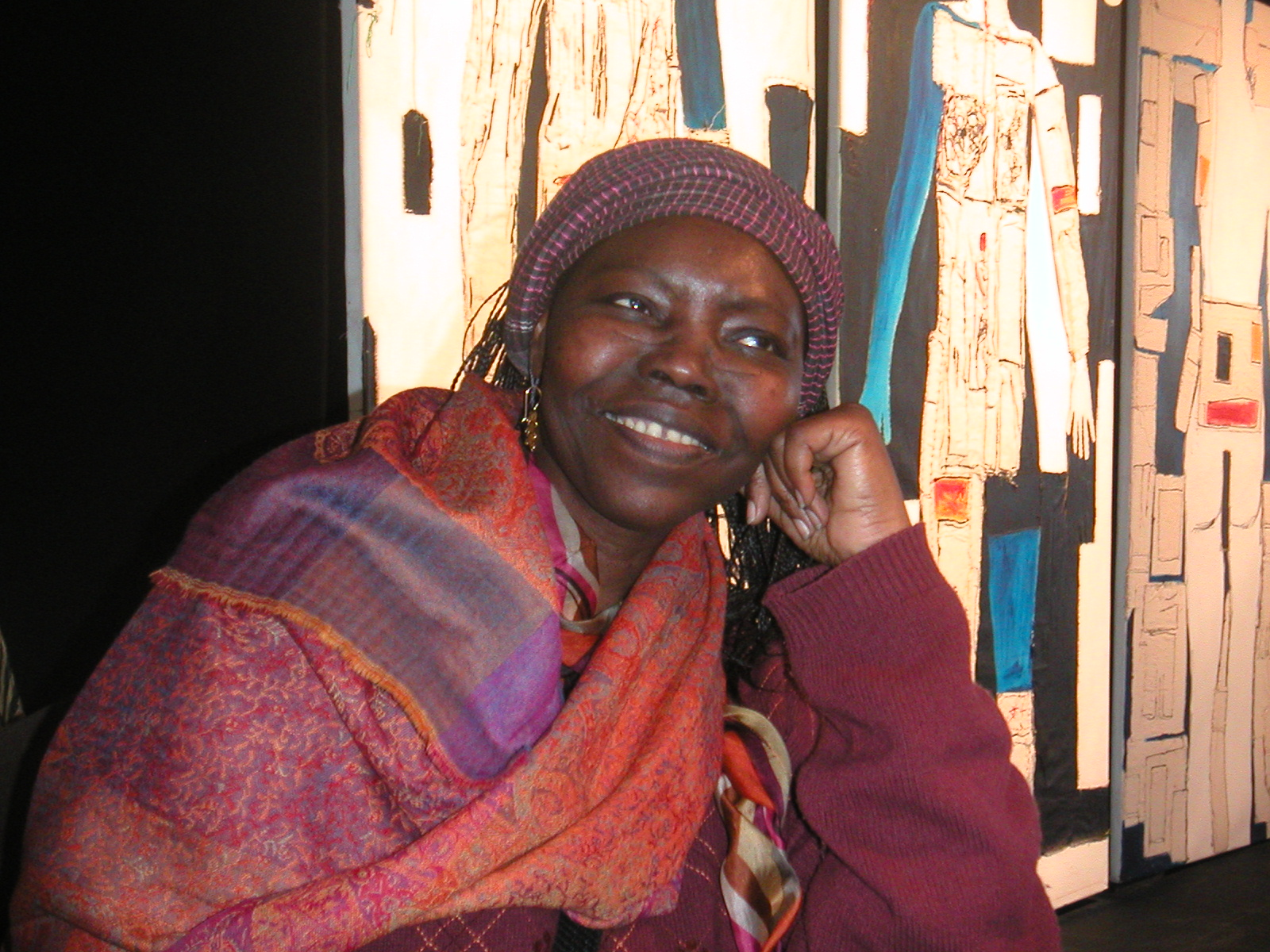
Faye, photographed in 2004

Kaddu Beykat is set in Faye's family village, Fad'jal (Fadial) in Thiès Region, southern Senegal. Financing for the film came from the French Ministry of Cooperation and it was made with a crew of three people. It is a mixture of documentary and fiction. For some parts of the film, Faye gathered villagers together, gave them a topic of conversation and proceeded to film them. She took advice from the villagers on what to film. As with her other work, Faye was careful to show African culture from the inside, rather than as an objective observer. The film is a critique of colonial farming practices and government policies which have encouraged single-crop farming of cash crops for export, in some cases leading villages further into poverty. The film is dedicated to Faye's grandfather who features in the film, and who died 11 days after filming ended.

== Distribution and reception ==
Kaddu Beykat played at the 1976 Berlin International Film Festival where it won the FIPRESCI Prize and the OCIC Award. It also won the Georges Sadoul Prize and an award at the Panafrican Film and Television Festival of Ouagadougou. It was released in France on October 20, 1976. It was initially banned in Senegal.
