= Noon language =

Cangin language spoken in Senegal

Noon
- Serer-Noon
- Native to: Senegal
- Region: Thiès
- Ethnicity: Serer-Noon
- Native speakers: 33,000 (2007)
- Language family: Niger–Congo?: Atlantic–Congo; Senegambian; Cangin; Lehar–Noon; Noon

Official status
- Official language in: Senegal

Language codes
- ISO 639-3: snf
- Glottolog: noon1242
- ELP: Noon

Noon (Non, None, Serer-Noon, Serer-Non) is a Cangin language of Senegal spoken in the Thiès region (14°47′N 16°55′W). There is an estimated population of 10,000- 50,000 speakers worldwide, rendering this language to be vulnerable. Ethnologue reports that it is 84% cognate (and 68% intelligible) with Lehar, essentially a divergent dialect, and 68% cognate with the other Cangin languages.

The Noon people identify themselves ethnically as Serer. However, their language, often called Serer-Noon on the assumption that it is a Serer dialect, is not closely related to the principal language of the Serer population, Serer-Sine.

== Status ==
Like many of the local languages in Senegal, the Noon language is officially recognized as one of the national languages of the country.

== Phonology ==
=== Vowels ===
In Noon, the vocalic system contains twenty phonemes: 10 short and 10 long vowels.

	Front				Central				Back			
	−ATR		+ATR		−ATR		+ATR		−ATR		+ATR	
	short	long	short	long	short	long	short	long	short	long	short	long
Close	ɪ ⟨i⟩	ɪː ⟨ii⟩	i ⟨í⟩	iː ⟨íi⟩					ʊ ⟨u⟩	ʊː ⟨uu⟩	u ⟨ú⟩	uː ⟨úu⟩
Close-mid			e ⟨é⟩	eː ⟨ée⟩							o ⟨ó⟩	oː ⟨óo⟩
Open-mid	ɛ ⟨e⟩	ɛː ⟨ee⟩					ə ⟨ë⟩	əː ⟨ëe⟩	ɔ ⟨o⟩	ɔː ⟨oo⟩		
Open					ä ⟨a⟩	äː ⟨aa⟩						

=== Consonants ===
In Noon, the consonantal system contains 27 phonemes.

		Labial	Alveolar	Palatal	Velar	Glottal
Nasal		m	n	ɲ ⟨ñ⟩	ŋ	
Plosive	voiceless	p	t	c	k	ʔ ⟨'⟩
Plosive	voiced	b	d	ɟ ⟨j⟩	g	
Plosive	prenasal	ᵐb ⟨mb⟩	ⁿd ⟨nd⟩	ᶮɟ ⟨ñj⟩	ᵑɡ ⟨ng⟩	
Plosive	implosive	ɓ	ɗ	ʄ ⟨ƴ⟩		
Fricative		f	s			h
Approximant			l	j	w	
Trill			(r)			

== Orthography ==
A Latin alphabet was proposed for Noon in 2001 and adopted by the Senegalese government in 2005. The alphabet consists of 47 letters, as listed below.

Letters of the alphabet
A	Aa	B	Ɓ	C	D	Ɗ	E	Ee	É	Ée	Ë	Ëe	F	G	H	I	Ii	Í	Íi	J	K	L	M
a	aa	b	ɓ	c	d	ɗ	e	ee	é	ée	ë	ëe	f	g	h	i	ii	í	íi	j	k	l	m
Mb	N	Ñ	Ŋ	Nd	Ñj	Ŋg	O	Oo	Ó	Óo	P	R	S	T	U	Uu	Ú	Úu	W	Y	Ƴ	ʼ	
mb	n	ñ	ŋ	nd	ñj	ŋg	o	oo	ó	óo	p	r	s	t	u	uu	ú	úu	w	y	ƴ	ʼ	

=== Consonants ===
The Noon alphabet contains 27 consonant letters. Glottal stop is not written at the beginning of the word, and it has no separate form for upper-case letters. The pre-nasalized consonants are written ⟨mb, nd, ñj, ŋg⟩. Geminate consonants are written with double letters, such as ⟨ɓɓ, cc, ff, hh, kk, ll, mm, nn, pp, ss, tt, ww, yy⟩. These are not considered separate letters of the alphabet. The letters ⟨b, d, g, j, ɗ, ƴ, ñ⟩ do not occur doubled.

=== Vowels ===
The Noon alphabet contains 20 vowel letters. −ATR vowels are written with the letters: ⟨a, e, i, o, u⟩; the +ATR equivalents are distinguished with a diacritic: ⟨ë, é, í, ó, ú⟩. Long vowels are written double: ⟨aa, ee, ii, oo, uu⟩ and ⟨ëe, ée, íi, óo, úu⟩ (only the first letter carries a diacritic). Long vowels count as distinct letters of the alphabet.

Vowel Chart
A	Aa	E	Ee	É	Ée	Ë	Ëe	I	Ii	Í	Íi	O	Oo	Ó	Óo	U	Uu	Ú	Úu
a	aa	e	ee	é	ée	ë	ëe	i	ii	í	íi	o	oo	ó	óo	u	uu	ú	úu

=== Capitalization rules ===
In general, there are three rules regarding capitalization in Noon. Much like other languages, they capitalize letters at the beginning of sentences and names.

1. Rule 1. An uppercase is used at the beginning of each enunciation point, and after each interrogation point (question mark), exclamation point, or the beginning of a quotation after a colon.
  Example: Ɓa haydoh këyitcaa hen, ɓa ee'tarica, kúmaandagaa an: «Yugat! Ɗú ɗekoh!» which translates to, 'As soon as they had searched the papers, they gave them to him, and the commander said: "Sit down! Be quiet!"'.
2. Rule 2. The first letter of any personal name, family, country, city, etc. are indicated by an uppercase letter.
  Example: Senegaal 'Senegal' or Caañaak 'Thiès'.
3. Rule 3. For franchise or business names beginning with ki-, the letter after the prefix ki- is often uppercase while the prefix itself is lowercase. Although, there is an exception if the prefix ki- appears in the beginning of a phrase or enunciation point.
  Example: kiToŋgol 'this year'; Whereas, if the phrase was in the beginning of an enunciation point, it would be rendered KiToŋgol to mean 'This year...'.

== Grammar ==
In Noon, the division of words is based on grammatical rules that are inherent in the language. The language undergoes many morphological changes, thus the language treats certain morphemes as being part of a single or key word, making them dependent. These morphemes are treated as prefixes that do not carry any independent meaning in itself, but are used for grammatical context.

Ki-

The infinitive ki- is prefixed to the subject of the verb. Examples:

kiñam 'to eat'
ki'on 'to give'
kilímu 'to be born'
kiɗúukool 'to be sick'

Di-

The adverb di- is prefixed. However, when bi- is used as a conjunction, it is written separately. Example:

Adverb: tani'in dijëfí' 'he is much better'

Conjunction: tani'in bi jof 'he is much better'

=== Class Markers ===
Class Markers such as wi-, fi-, mi-, etc. are prefixed to the subject of the adjective. Examples:

kaan fi'as 'a new house'
ha'mun yi'as 'a new owner'
túuƴ wimórí' 'a beautiful room'

=== Object Pronouns ===
Object pronouns are suffixed to a verb due to morphological changes that appear with most personal object pronouns (with the exception of the 3rd person plural), where the initial consonant of morpheme is adapted to the final consonant of the verb. Similarly, other object pronouns are also linked as suffixes when they appear with a preposition. However, there is an exception with the preposition ga- which is never suffixed to the verb. Examples:

hottoo 'he sees me'
hottaa 'he sees you' (informal)
hotti 'he sees him (a man)'
hottíi 'he sees us (but not you)'
hottuu 'he sees us (you included)'
hottúu 'he sees you' (formal or plural)
hotɓa 'he sees them (the men)'
hotfa 'he sees it (the house)'
hotca 'he sees them (the houses)'

Ga- preposition exception:

Ñamaa ga! 'Eat it!'
yaa tík gaɗa 'the following'

Furthermore, the same object pronouns are suffixed to prepositions. Example:

Mi hay naraa kitaam. 'I will go with you.'

=== Possessive Pronouns ===
The possessive pronouns in Noon are suffixed to a name that appears after the definite article. The decision to treat these pronouns as suffixes, and not as an independent words that are formed by the preposition ga- followed by the object pronoun, has been made so that the possessive pronouns possess a complementary distribution. This means, that the names are determined by relational possessive pronouns, or by possessive pronouns, depending on the character's name. Another reason for this suffix is the first person singular form of -goo (used in contraction with garoo) which appears only in cases of possessive pronouns, and never with the preposition ga-. Examples:

kowkiigoo 'my child'
kowkiigaraa 'your child' (informal)
kowkiigari 'his/her child'
kowkiigaríi 'our child'
kowkiigaruu 'our child'
kowkiigarúu 'your child' (formal or plural)
kowkiigaɓa 'their child'
towtiigaca 'their fruits'

Note that the preposition ga- is not suffixed to a word. Also note, that when ga- or garoo is used in the 1st person singular, it changes the form. Example:

Feetaa newin gaɓa. 'They liked the party.'
Feetaa newin garoo. 'I liked the party.'

Possessive pronouns that are relational are suffixed to the noted topic because of morphophonological changes that concern the assimilation of the initial consonant of the pronoun to the final consonant of the name (in the 1st person singular tense or the 1st and 2nd person plural tense). Examples:

yaakkoo 'my big brother'
yaakfu 'your big brother' (informal)
yaakci 'his big brother'
yaakkíi 'our big brother'
yaakkuu 'our big brother'
yaakkúu 'your big brother' (formal or plural)
yaakɓa 'their big brother'

=== Definite Articles ===
The definite articles -ii, -um and -aa are suffixed, in conjunction with a class marker, to an indicative name or place. Examples:

hal halii 'the door (here)'
oomaa oomaanaa 'the child (there)'
kow kowkaa 'the child (there)'
pe' pe'faa 'the goat (there)'
misoo' misoorum 'the headscarf (near to you)'
tuhaan tuhaantii 'the bongos (here)'

Additionally, definite articles are suffixed to adjectives in the same manner that names are suffixed in Noon. Examples:

túuyaa wi'aswaa 'the new room (there)'
kaanfii fimo'tafii 'the beautiful home (here)'
kubaaykii jisúusúusjii 'the black puppy (here)'
tediktaa tihoo'tataa 'the large trees (there)'

=== Subordinate Clauses ===
In Noon, the suffix -(n)aa is indicative of a subordinate clause and —ɗa is indicative of a relative subordinate clause. The reasons for treating these morphemes as suffixes are due to morphophonological changes to -(n)aa, and their grammatical functions in words for both -(n)aa and -ɗa. The insertion of a nasal vowel in a word placed at the ending of a proposal indicates that the morpheme is a phonological word with the word that it precedes. We also see glottalized consonants and certain nasal consonants change in subordinate clauses. Both morphemes -(n)aa and -ɗa carry grammatical meaning rather than lexical meaning as they indicate the entire proposition, describing its function in the sentence. Examples:

Fu hayaa, ɗuu ñam. 'We will eat, when you come' (worded in the form: 'When you come, we will eat.')
Fu hot kowkaanaa, wo'aari ya hay. 'If you see his son, tell him to come.'

However, unlike -ɗa, which is a morpheme indicative of a proposal, there is an adverb ɗa which can translate to 'alone' or 'like this/that'. You can note the difference between the two forms, as the adverb is always separated, since it carries an independent lexical meaning. Example:

Maŋgoocaa ñamsi ɗa. 'The mangoes are eaten alone'

=== Interrogative Clauses ===
In Noon, the suffix -(n)e is used to indicate general interrogative clauses. Examples:

Fu hay kihay kuwise? 'Are you coming tomorrow?'
Fu hotin kowkiigoone? 'Have you seen my child?'

For an alternative interrogative clause, the suffix -(n)oo is used. Examples:

Fu waa' ki'an músúnoo miis? 'Would you like to drink water or milk?'
Fu en ga foohoo ga ɗuuƴ? 'Are you outside or inside?'

In vocative cases, the suffix -(n)óo is suffixed to a name.

Example: Bañóo! 'Hell!'

== Vocabulary ==
=== Numerals ===
Noon has a quinary-decimal system. The alternative form for 'one', wɪtnɔː, is only used in the counting process. Actually, it is very common for the Noon to use pure Wolof or French when counting above the number from 100 onwards.

1. ˈwiːnɔː / ˈwitnɔː*	21. daːŋkah kanak na ˈwiːnɔː
2. ˈkanak	22. daːŋkah kanak na ˈkanak
3. ˈkaːhaj	23. daːŋkah kanak na ˈkaːhaj
4. ˈnɪkɪːs	24. daːŋkah kanak na ˈnɪkɪːs
5. ˈjətu̘ːs	25. daːŋkah kanak na ˈjətu̘ːs
6. jɪtˈnɪːnɔː (5 + 1)	26. daːŋkah kanak na jɪtˈnɪːnɔ
7. jɪtnaˈkanak (5 + 2)	27. daːŋkah kanak na jɪtnaˈkanak
8. jɪtnaˈkaːhaj (5 + 3)	28. daːŋkah kanak na jɪtnaˈkaːhaj
9. jɪtnaˈnɪkɪːs (5 + 4)	29. daːŋkah kanak na jɪtnaˈnɪkɪːs
10. ˈdaːŋkah	30. daːŋkah ˈkaːhaj
11. daːŋkah na ˈwiːnɔː	40. daːŋkah ˈnɪkɪːs
12. daːŋkah na ˈkanak	50. daːŋkah ˈjətu̘s
13. daːŋkah na ˈkaːhaj	60. daːŋkah jɪtˈnɪːnɔ
14. daːŋkah na ˈnɪkɪːs	70. daːŋkah jɪtnaˈkanak
15. daːŋkah na ˈjətu̘ːs	80. daːŋkah jɪtnaˈkaːhaj
16. daːŋkah na jɪtˈnɪːnɔ	90. daːŋkah jɪtnaˈnɪkɪːs
17. daːŋkah na jɪtnaˈkanak	100. ˈteːmeːʔ < Wolof
18. daːŋkah na jɪtnaˈkaːhaj	200. tɛːmɛːʔ ˈkanak
19. daːŋkah na jɪtnaˈnɪkɪːs	1000. ˈɟu̘nːi < Wolof
20. daːŋkah ˈkanak	2000. ˈɟu̘nːi ˈkanak
