= Beti Ellerson =

American women activist

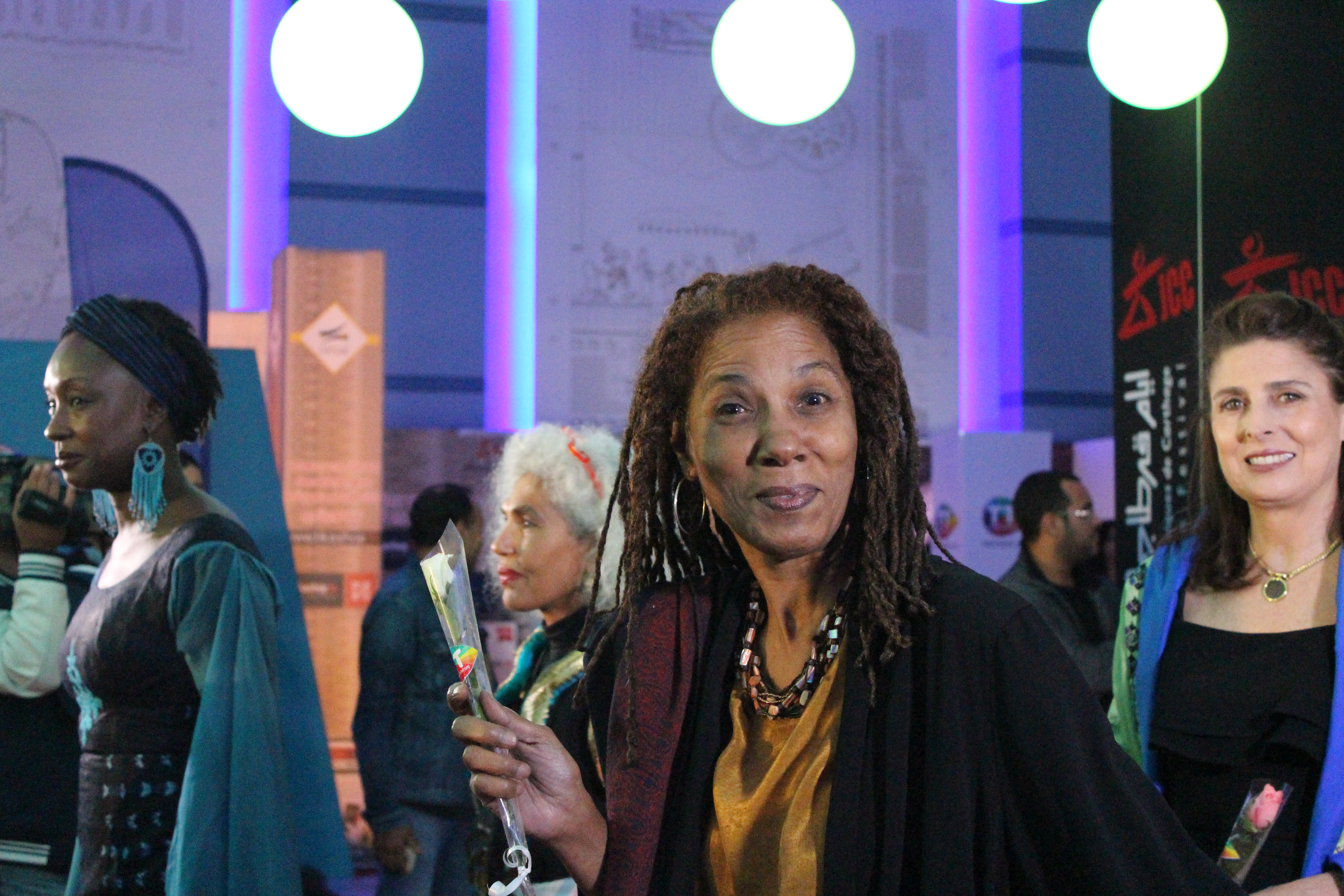
- Ellerson at Carthage film festival
- Born: United States
- Occupations: Director, feminist, social women activist
- Years active: 1996–present

Beti Ellerson is an American filmmaker and activist particularly active in African cinema. She established the Centre for the Study and Research of African Women in Cinema.

== Personal life ==
She completed PhD in African Studies from Howard University, USA. It consisted with interdisciplinary specializations in Visual Culture, African Cinema Studies, and Women Studies. In 2004, she was lecturer at Howard University in Washington, D.C. In 2017, Ellerson was a scholar-in-residence at Texas Tech University.

== Career ==
When Ellerson started as a 1996–1997 Rockefeller Humanities Fellow, she continued post-doctoral research project with the title African Women in the Visual Media: Culture and Politics. She later studied script writing, video production, editing and television production at the local public access community television. With the experience she gained through cultural community in Washington, D.C., Ellerson produce and host a series called Reels of Colour. The series aired from 1997 to 2000, comprised a total of 27 episodes that ran on the local public stations in the Washington, D.C., area.

Later in 2000, she made a documentary project called Sisters of the Screen, as well as a book titled Sisters of the Screen: Women of Africa on Film, Video and Television. The project was later developed as a film with the same title in 2002 by Ellerson as her maiden cinema direction. Meanwhile, she continued to documenting the research on women. As a result, she created an extensive online teaching and learning guide on African women in cinema in 2004.

She wrote many articles for the African Women in Cinema Dossier of the Black Camera International Film Journal. In 2008, Ellerson created the online Centre for the Study and Research of African Women in Cinema. In 2012, she was the keynote speaker at the 2012 colloquy on Francophone African Women Filmmakers held in Paris. Ellerson described On n'oublie pas, on pardonne - a film by Annette Jouamba Matondo - as "cathartic".

She was a Jury member in several film festivals across the world, including; 2011 International Images Film Festival for Women held in Harare, 2018 London Feminist Film Festival and 2018 Carthage Film Festival (JCC). Apart from that, she was the president of the Diaspora Jury at Panafrican Film and Television Festival of Ouagadougou (FESPACO) in 2013. At the Afrika Film Festival Cologne 2016, she was the moderator for Fokus: Sisters in African Cinema Roundtable in Germany.

== Filmography ==
Year	Film	Role	Ref.
2002	Sisters of the Screen	Director	
