= Demographics of Senegal =

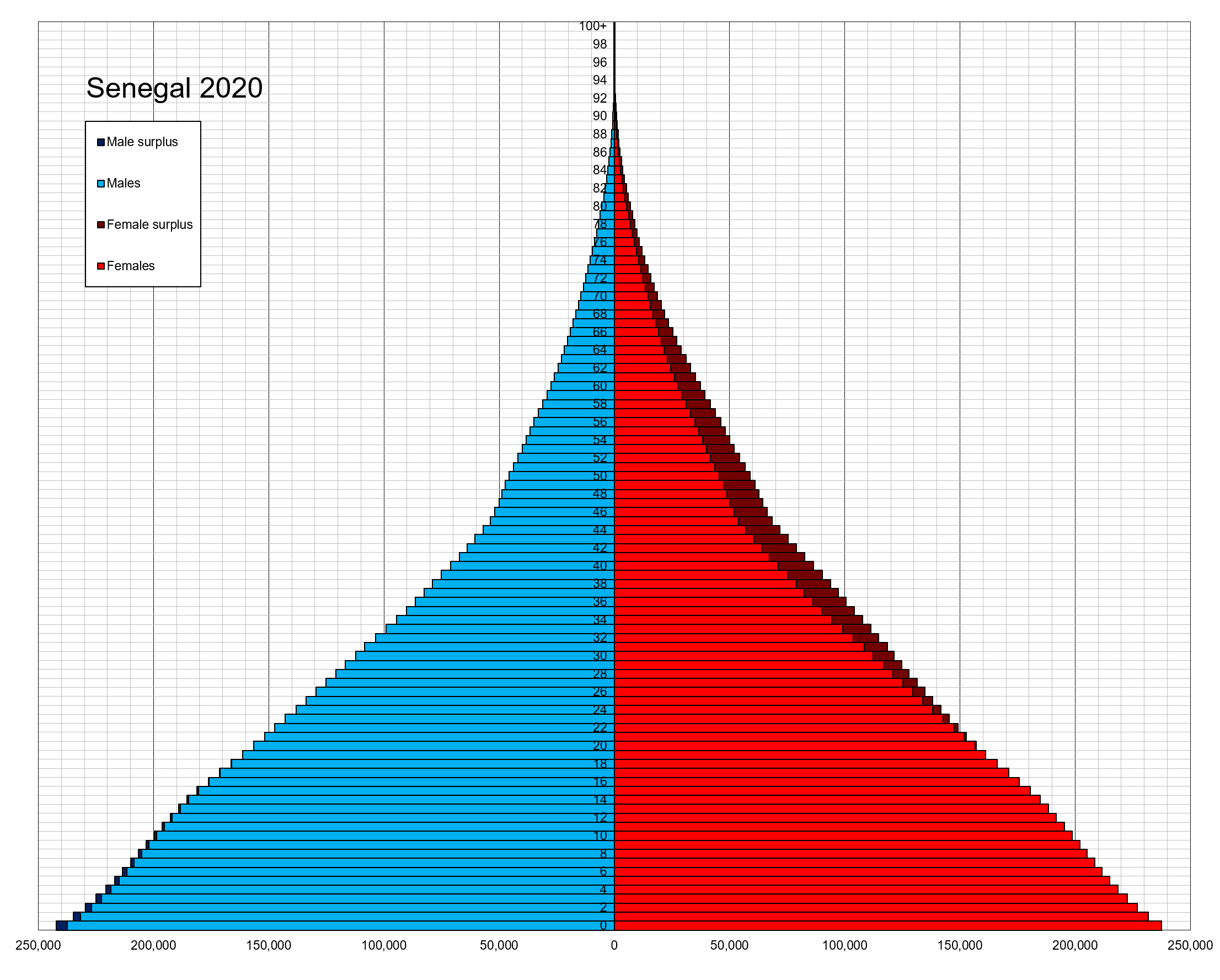
- Population pyramid of Senegal in 2020
- Population: 17,923,036 (2022 est.)
- Growth rate: 2.57% (2022 est.)
- Birth rate: 28.9 births/1,000 population (2025 est.)
- Death rate: 5.4 deaths/1,000 population (2025 est.)
- Life expectancy: 69.96 years
  - male: 68.23 years
  - female: 71.77 years
- Fertility rate: 3.71 children born/woman (2025 est.)
- Infant mortality: 32.44 deaths/1,000 live births
- Net migration rate: -0.71 migrant(s)/1,000 population

Sex ratio
- Total: 0.97 male(s)/female (2022 est.)
- At birth: 1.05 male(s)/female

Nationality
- Nationality: Senegalese

Language
- Official: French

Demographic features of the population of Senegal include population density, ethnicity, education level, health of the populace, economic status, religious affiliations and other aspects of the population.

About 42% of Senegal's population is rural. In rural areas, population density varies from about 77 per square kilometer (200/mile²) in the west-central region to 2 per square kilometer (5/mile²) in the arid eastern section. The average population density for the country is 68 people per square kilometer (180 people/mi^{2}). French is the official language but is used regularly only by the literate minority. Almost all Senegalese speak an indigenous language, of which Wolof has the largest usage. Many Senegalese live in Europe, particularly in France, Italy and Spain.

== Population ==
Demographics of Senegal, From UN estimates; Number of inhabitants in millions.

According to the 2018 revision of the World Population Review the total population was 16,302,789 in May 2018, compared to only 2,416,000 in 1950. The proportion of children below the age of 15 in 2017 was 41.5%, between 15 and 54 years of age was 31.1%, while 55 years or older was 6.9%.

	Total population	Population aged 0–14 (%)	Population aged 15–64 (%)	Population aged 65+ (%)
1950	2,416,000	41.6	55.0	3.4
1955	2,684,000	41.5	55.6	2.9
1960	3,048,000	41.9	55.5	2.6
1965	3,505,000	43.0	54.6	2.4
1970	4,096,000	44.3	53.5	2.3
1975	4,786,000	45.3	52.5	2.2
1980	5,414,000	47.2	50.5	2.2
1985	6,232,000	47.7	50.0	2.3
1990	7,242,000	47.2	50.4	2.4
1995	8,369,000	46.2	51.3	2.5
2000	9,506,000	45.4	52.1	2.5
2005	10,872,000	44.4	53.1	2.5
2010	12,434,000	43.7	53.9	2.4
2017	14,668,522	41.5	55.5	2.9

Population Estimates by Sex and Age Group (Estimates 1.VII.2020) (Data refer to national projections.):

Age group	Male	Female	Total	%
Total	8 456 486	8 504 040	16 960 525	100
0–4	1 373 744	1 294 257	2 668 002	15.73
5–9	1 219 736	1 146 769	2 366 505	13.95
10–14	1 066 780	1 005 257	2 072 037	12.22
15–19	919 100	893 599	1 812 700	10.69
20–24	762 949	805 877	1 568 826	9.25
25–29	640 669	694 125	1 334 794	7.87
30–34	527 920	562 852	1 090 772	6.43
35–39	433 152	466 088	899 240	5.30
40–44	335 430	374 282	709 711	4.18
45–49	278 289	309 644	587 933	3.47
50–54	244 474	259 784	504 259	2.97
55–59	200 080	208 825	408 905	3.41
60–64	149 832	154 155	303 986	1.79
65–69	112 949	116 334	229 284	1.35
70–74	80 355	84 366	164 721	0.97
75-79	52 036	58 255	110 292	0.65
80+	58 988	69 570	128 558	0.76
Age group	Male	Female	Total	Percent
0–14	3 660 260	3 446 283	7 106 543	41.90
15–64	4 491 898	4 729 232	9 221 130	54.37
65+	304 328	328 525	632 853	3.73

== Vital statistics ==
Registration of vital events in Senegal is not complete. The Population Department of the United Nations prepared the following estimates.

	Mid-year population	Live births	Deaths	Natural change	Crude birth rate (per 1000)	Crude death rate (per 1000)	Natural change (per 1000)	Total fertility rate (TFR)	Infant mortality (per 1000 births)	Life expectancy (in years)
1950	2,496,065	128,935	70,149	58,786	51.7	28.1	23.5	6.79	148.6	36.43
1951	2,561,152	131,813	71,373	60,440	51.5	27.9	23.6	6.79	146.4	36.92
1952	2,628,508	134,812	72,658	62,154	51.3	27.7	23.7	6.79	144.4	37.36
1953	2,698,414	137,960	73,519	64,441	51.2	27.3	23.9	6.80	142.3	37.81
1954	2,771,247	141,384	74,406	66,978	51.1	26.9	24.2	6.82	140.3	38.20
1955	2,847,262	144,935	75,134	69,801	51.0	26.4	24.5	6.83	138.4	38.63
1956	2,926,572	148,593	75,940	72,653	50.8	26.0	24.9	6.86	136.7	39.04
1957	3,008,862	151,951	76,951	75,000	50.6	25.6	25.0	6.89	135.3	39.36
1958	3,093,941	155,903	78,330	77,573	50.5	25.3	25.1	6.92	134.3	39.55
1959	3,182,056	160,368	79,820	80,548	50.5	25.1	25.3	6.96	133.7	39.74
1960	3,273,177	164,735	81,546	83,189	50.4	24.9	25.4	7.00	133.3	39.88
1961	3,367,082	169,342	83,613	85,729	50.4	24.9	25.5	7.04	133.3	39.92
1962	3,463,524	173,826	86,017	87,809	50.3	24.9	25.4	7.08	133.4	39.86
1963	3,562,469	178,101	88,190	89,911	50.1	24.8	25.3	7.12	133.7	39.88
1964	3,664,599	182,552	90,465	92,087	49.9	24.7	25.2	7.16	133.9	39.89
1965	3,770,874	187,663	92,996	94,667	49.8	24.7	25.1	7.19	134.0	39.84
1966	3,881,994	192,917	95,105	97,812	49.8	24.5	25.2	7.22	133.9	39.96
1967	3,997,869	198,287	97,316	100,971	49.7	24.4	25.3	7.24	133.5	40.08
1968	4,117,659	203,618	99,372	104,246	49.5	24.2	25.4	7.25	132.9	40.27
1969	4,240,859	209,482	101,478	108,004	49.5	24.0	25.5	7.26	132.0	40.46
1970	4,367,744	215,753	103,029	112,724	49.5	23.6	25.9	7.26	130.7	40.83
1971	4,498,616	222,237	104,511	117,726	49.5	23.3	26.2	7.26	128.9	41.22
1972	4,633,452	228,423	105,472	122,951	49.4	22.8	26.6	7.26	126.6	41.75
1973	4,772,039	234,397	105,414	128,983	49.2	22.1	27.1	7.26	124.0	42.56
1974	4,911,421	240,854	105,802	135,052	49.0	21.5	27.5	7.25	121.0	43.21
1975	5,047,922	247,687	105,209	142,478	49.0	20.8	28.2	7.25	117.5	44.10
1976	5,181,195	254,743	104,054	150,689	49.1	20.0	29.0	7.26	113.7	45.10
1977	5,308,297	260,572	102,502	158,070	48.9	19.2	29.7	7.27	109.7	46.15
1978	5,433,225	264,864	100,615	164,249	48.6	18.5	30.1	7.28	105.9	47.20
1979	5,564,474	268,813	98,791	170,022	48.2	17.7	30.5	7.29	102.3	48.20
1980	5,703,869	273,843	97,249	176,594	47.9	17.0	30.9	7.29	99.3	49.14
1981	5,852,029	279,093	96,624	182,469	47.6	16.5	31.1	7.28	96.7	49.85
1982	6,008,392	284,059	96,003	188,056	47.2	15.9	31.2	7.25	94.4	50.56
1983	6,171,874	288,732	95,783	192,949	46.7	15.5	31.2	7.19	92.1	51.15
1984	6,341,801	292,559	94,444	198,115	46.0	14.9	31.2	7.11	89.5	52.02
1985	6,520,705	296,683	93,381	203,302	45.4	14.3	31.1	7.01	86.7	52.76
1986	6,710,885	299,038	90,601	208,437	44.5	13.5	31.0	6.90	83.1	53.93
1987	6,909,837	303,194	88,930	214,264	43.8	12.9	31.0	6.79	79.8	54.82
1988	7,113,636	304,428	86,919	217,509	42.8	12.2	30.5	6.58	76.8	55.77
1989	7,321,832	309,505	86,161	223,344	42.2	11.8	30.5	6.48	74.5	56.44
1990	7,536,001	316,620	86,250	230,370	42.0	11.4	30.5	6.40	72.9	56.95
1991	7,754,289	320,601	87,599	233,002	41.3	11.3	30.0	6.27	72.1	57.14
1992	7,974,514	325,946	89,871	236,075	40.8	11.3	29.6	6.15	71.9	57.11
1993	8,196,551	332,147	92,654	239,493	40.5	11.3	29.2	6.05	72.1	57.00
1994	8,416,997	335,891	95,143	240,748	39.8	11.3	28.6	5.92	72.5	56.96
1995	8,632,681	342,324	97,963	244,361	39.6	11.3	28.3	5.82	73.0	56.84
1996	8,843,423	348,436	101,013	247,423	39.3	11.4	27.9	5.72	73.4	56.67
1997	9,051,539	356,266	103,620	252,646	39.3	11.4	27.8	5.64	73.2	56.59
1998	9,261,526	363,901	106,679	257,222	39.2	11.5	27.7	5.58	72.6	56.42
1999	9,478,564	374,758	108,241	266,517	39.4	11.4	28.0	5.57	71.4	56.61
2000	9,704,287	381,017	108,766	272,251	39.2	11.2	28.0	5.50	69.2	56.94
2001	9,938,027	387,416	107,728	279,688	38.9	10.8	28.1	5.41	66.4	57.56
2002	10,180,950	394,576	106,349	288,227	38.7	10.4	28.2	5.31	63.1	58.23
2003	10,434,504	403,780	103,869	299,911	38.6	9.9	28.7	5.25	59.5	59.12
2004	10,698,691	411,222	101,255	309,967	38.4	9.4	28.9	5.18	55.9	60.03
2005	10,974,057	422,547	98,881	323,666	38.4	9.0	29.4	5.19	52.7	60.92
2006	11,263,387	436,406	96,823	339,583	38.7	8.6	30.1	5.20	49.5	61.75
2007	11,563,869	442,235	94,763	347,472	38.2	8.2	30.0	5.11	46.8	62.54
2008	11,872,929	450,758	93,168	357,590	37.9	7.8	30.1	5.05	44.3	63.24
2009	12,195,029	465,658	91,835	373,823	38.1	7.5	30.6	5.08	42.1	63.92
2010	12,530,121	473,819	90,265	383,554	37.7	7.2	30.6	5.06	40.0	64.62
2011	12,875,880	483,824	88,945	394,879	37.5	6.9	30.6	5.04	38.2	65.26
2012	13,231,833	493,250	89,885	403,365	37.2	6.8	30.4	5.01	36.4	65.46
2013	13,595,566	501,507	88,577	412,930	36.8	6.5	30.3	4.96	34.7	66.07
2014	13,970,308	508,203	88,400	419,803	36.3	6.3	30.0	4.91	33.1	66.45
2015	14,356,181	508,147	87,797	420,350	35.4	6.1	29.2	4.78	31.5	66.88
2016	14,751,356	511,960	86,228	425,732	34.7	5.8	28.8	4.68	29.9	67.50
2017	15,157,793	519,212	86,790	432,422	34.2	5.7	28.5	4.62	28.5	67.75
2018	15,574,909	529,314	86,967	442,347	34.0	5.6	28.4	4.58	27.2	68.10
2019	16,353,000	497,000	98,000	399,000	30.4	6.0	24.4	4.10	27.1	67.7
2020	16,789,000	503,000	102,000	401,000	29.9	6.1	23.9	4.00	26.0	67.5
2021	17,221,000	512,000	109,000	403,000	29.7	6.1	23.4	3.94	25.1	66.9
2022	17,651,000	520,000	104,000	416,000	29.5	5.9	26.7	3.86	25.1	67.8
2023	18,078,000	532,000	101,000	431,000	29.4	5.6	23.8	3.82	24.1	68.7
2024					29.2	5.5	23.7	3.77		
2025					28.9	5.4	23.5	3.71		

=== Demographic and Health Surveys ===
Total Fertility Rate (TFR) (Wanted Fertility Rate) and Crude Birth Rate (CBR):

Year	Total		Urban		Rural	
Year	CBR	TFR	CBR	TFR	CBR	TFR
1980-82	—N/a	7.4	—N/a	6.3	—N/a	7.9
1983-85	—N/a	6.6	—N/a	5.4	—N/a	7.1
1992-93	40.8	6.03 (5.1)	37.4	5.06 (3.8)	42.9	6.74 (5.9)
1997	37	5.67 (4.6)	31	4.29 (3.2)	42	6.74 (5.6)
1999	36	5.2	30	3.9	40	6.1
2005	39.3	5.3 (4.5)	33.4	4.1 (3.3)	44.0	6.4 (5.7)
2008–2009	37.3	4.9	33.4	4.0	40.1	5.8
2010–2011	37.4	5.0 (3.2)	32.3	3.9 (2.6)	41.6	6.0 (3.8)
2012–2013	38.6	5.3	32.9	4.1	42.7	6.3
2014	37.6	5.0 (3.7)	33.4	4.0 (3.1)	41.6	6.3 (4.4)
2015	35.7	4.9 (4.3)	28.1	3.5 (3.1)	41.5	6.1 (5.4)
2016	34.6	4.7 (4.2)	27.2	3.5 (3.1)	40.8	5.9 (5.2)
2017	33.7	4.6 (4.0)	27.1	3.4 (3.0)	39.2	5.9 (5.1)
2018	32.7	4.4 (4.0)	27.2	3.2 (3.0)	37.0	5.5 (5.0)
2019	34.0	4.7	29.2	3.8	37.8	5.6
2020–2021	28.7	3.9	24.7	3.1	31.8	4.7
2023	29.6	4.0 (3.6)	26.0	3.3 (2.9)	32.7	4.7 (4.2)

View source data.
View source data.
View source data.
View source data.

Fertility data by region (DHS Program):

Region	TFR (2005)	TFR (2010/11)	TFR (2017)	TFR (2023)
Dakar	3.7	3.7	3.0	3.1
Thiès	5.4	4.8	4.6	3.9
Diourbel	6.2	5.2	5.8	4.1
Kaolack	5.9	6.0	5.2	4.3
Kaffrine		6.5	6.2	6.0
Louga	5.6	4.8	5.1	4.0
Fatick	6.8	6.3	5.2	4.6
Ziguinchor	5.0	4.8	4.6	3.7
Sédhiou		6.9	6.4	5.5
Kolda	6.3	6.8	5.5	4.9
Matam	3.7	5.4	5.3	4.5
Saint-Louis	5.3	5.0	4.7	3.6
Kédougou		6.1	6.4	5.2
Tambacounda	6.2	6.0	5.8	4.4

=== Life expectancy ===
Period	Life expectancy in Years
1950–1955	35.47
1955–1960	▲37.49
1960–1965	▲38.62
1965–1970	▼38.41
1970–1975	▲40.91
1975–1980	▲46.50
1980–1985	▲51.27
1985–1990	▲56.05
1990–1995	▲57.59
1995–2000	▼57.25
2000–2005	▲58.93
2005–2010	▲62.41
2010–2015	▲65.71

== Ethnic groups ==
Wolof 33.1%, Pular 30.2%, Serer 17%, Mandinka 5.6%, Jola 4.5%, Soninke 1.4%, Other 8.3% (2017)

Population of Senegal according to ethnic group in 1976 and 1988
Ethnic group	census 1976		census 1988	
Ethnic group	Number	%	Number	%
Wolof	2,001,416	41.0%	2,890,402	42.7%
Serer	716,919	14.7%	1,009,921	14.9%
Peul	605,584	12.4%	978,366	14.4%
Toucouleur	528,490	10.8%	631,892	9.3%
Diola	265,353	5.4%	357,672	5.3%
Mandingue	179,050	3.7%	245,651	3.6%
Soce	179,050	3.7%	42,751	0.6%
Sarakhole	84,102	1.7%	113,184	1.7%
Bambara	65,096	1.3%	91,071	1.3%
Maure	59,784	1.2%	67,726	1.0%
Mandjaag	41,628	0.9%	66,605	1.0%
Lebou	94,837	1.9%	56,758	0.8%
Balant	33,915	0.7%	54,398	0.8%
Malinke	202,472	4.1%	28,643	0.4%
Mancagne	202,472	4.1%	23,180	0.3%
Laobe	202,472	4.1%	18,250	0.3%
Bassari	202,472	4.1%	6,195	0.1%
Khassonke	202,472	4.1%	1,752	0.0%
Coniagui	202,472	4.1%	1,119	0.0%
Fula	202,472	4.1%	108	0.0%
Other	202,472	4.1%	87,773	1.3%
Total	4,879,103		6,773,417	

== Languages ==
French (official), Wolof, Pulaar, Hassaniya Arabic, Serer, Jola, Mandinka, Soninke, Arabic (Note: Arabic is taught as a second language for religious reasons within the Senegalese educational system.)

== Religion ==
The religious beliefs of the 2016 population of Senegal are: Muslim 96.1% (mostly Sunni), Christian 3.6% (mostly Roman Catholic), animist 0.3%.

== Emigration ==
Senegal was historically a destination country for neighboring economic migrants, but in recent decades West African migrants more often use Senegal as a transit point to North Africa, or as a stop before continuing illegally onward to Europe. The country also has been host to several thousand black Mauritanian refugees since they were expelled from Mauritania during the 1989 border conflict with Senegal. The country's economic crisis in the 1970s stimulated emigration; departures accelerated from the 1990s. Destinations shifted from neighboring countries to Libya and Mauritania, because of their booming oil industries, and to France, Italy and Spain.

== See also ==
- Senegal
