= Bagaya =

- Village
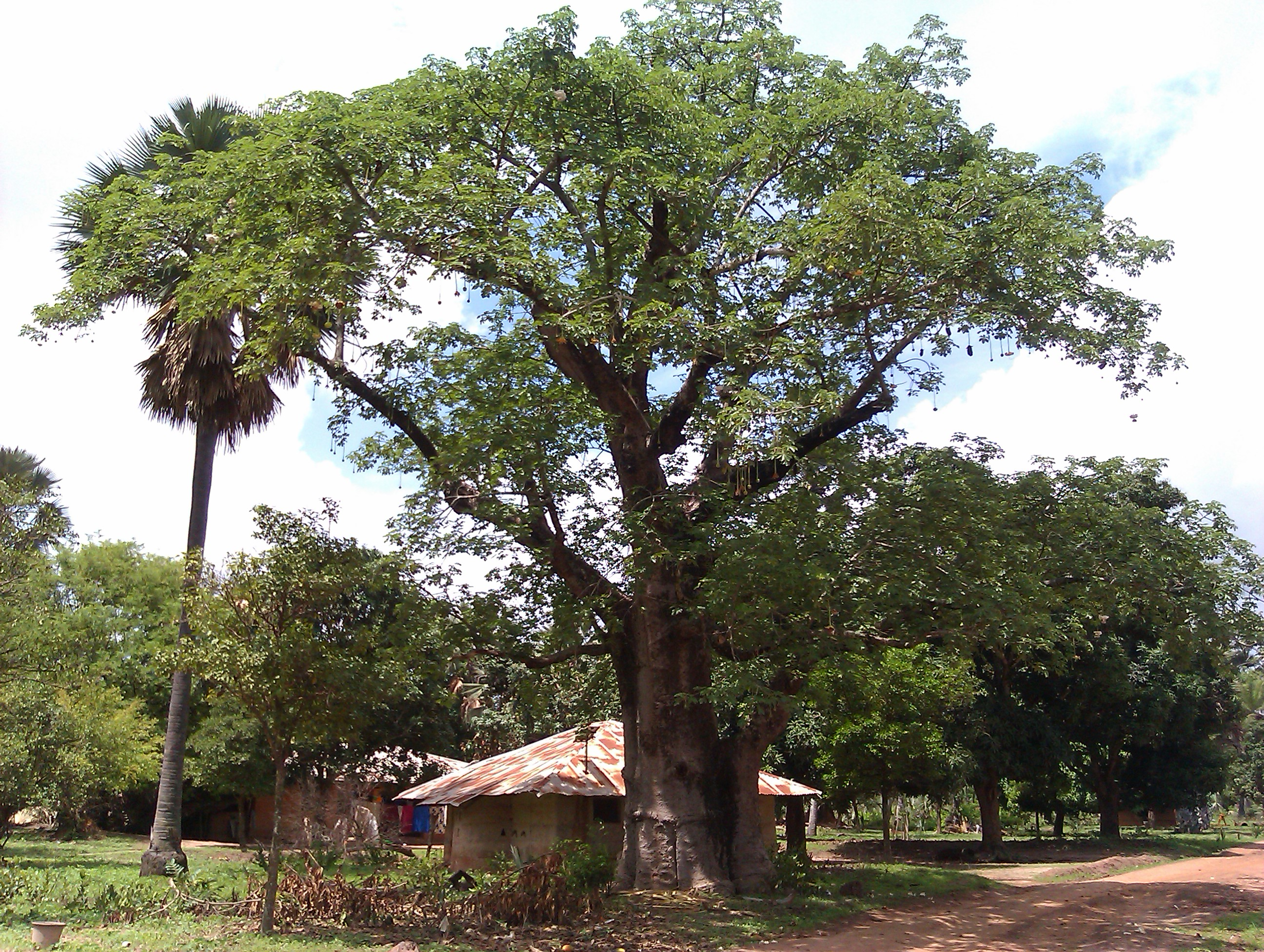
- Typical house in Bagaya

- Location within Senegal
- Coordinates: 12°43′52″N 16°23′52″W
- Country: Senegal
- Region: Ziguinchor Region
- Departement: Bignona
- Arrondissement: Tendouck
- Rural community: Balinghore

Population (2011)
  - Total: 1,020
- Time zone: UTC+0 (GMT)

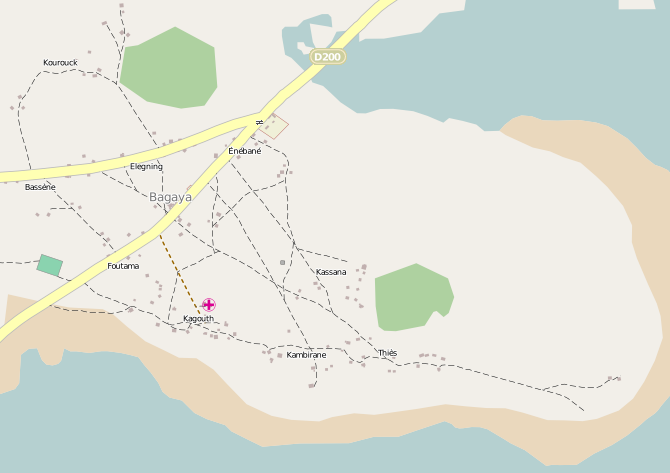
Map of the village

Bagaya is a settlement in Senegal in the department Bignona, in the region Ziguinchor Region, in the Casamance area. Bagaya belongs to the rural community of Balinghore in the arrondissement of Tendouck. It is located on the road from Bignona to Elana between Mandégane and Diatock.

The village consists of quarters, a group of about 20 houses scattered in the bush. Around the village there are rice fields (rizières) at the edge of the Casamance River.

== People and economy ==
The village has 142 families. There is a very young population, but the region has a huge shortage of infrastructure. Many people are fleeing to the major cities of Senegal because of the lack of schools and employment. There is hardly any industry or food processing.

== Facilities ==
The roads and buildings are in bad shape. Not all the houses are equipped with electricity. Even if there is electricity then the refrigerator, or the television cannot be turned on because the family income is much too low. There are daily power cuts of 1 to 3 hours duration; frequently between 19:00 and 23:00, possibly also during noon.

There is a dispensary and a maternity hospital. People in Bagaya are aware of good hygiene and medical treatment. Traditional medicine and superstition is also practiced a lot.

Students can attend the university of Ziguinchor, or Dakar. They can attend secondary school in Bignona.

People are not conscious about the effects of waste on the environment. Plans should be developed to recuperate e.g. batteries and plastics.

== Agriculture and nutrition ==
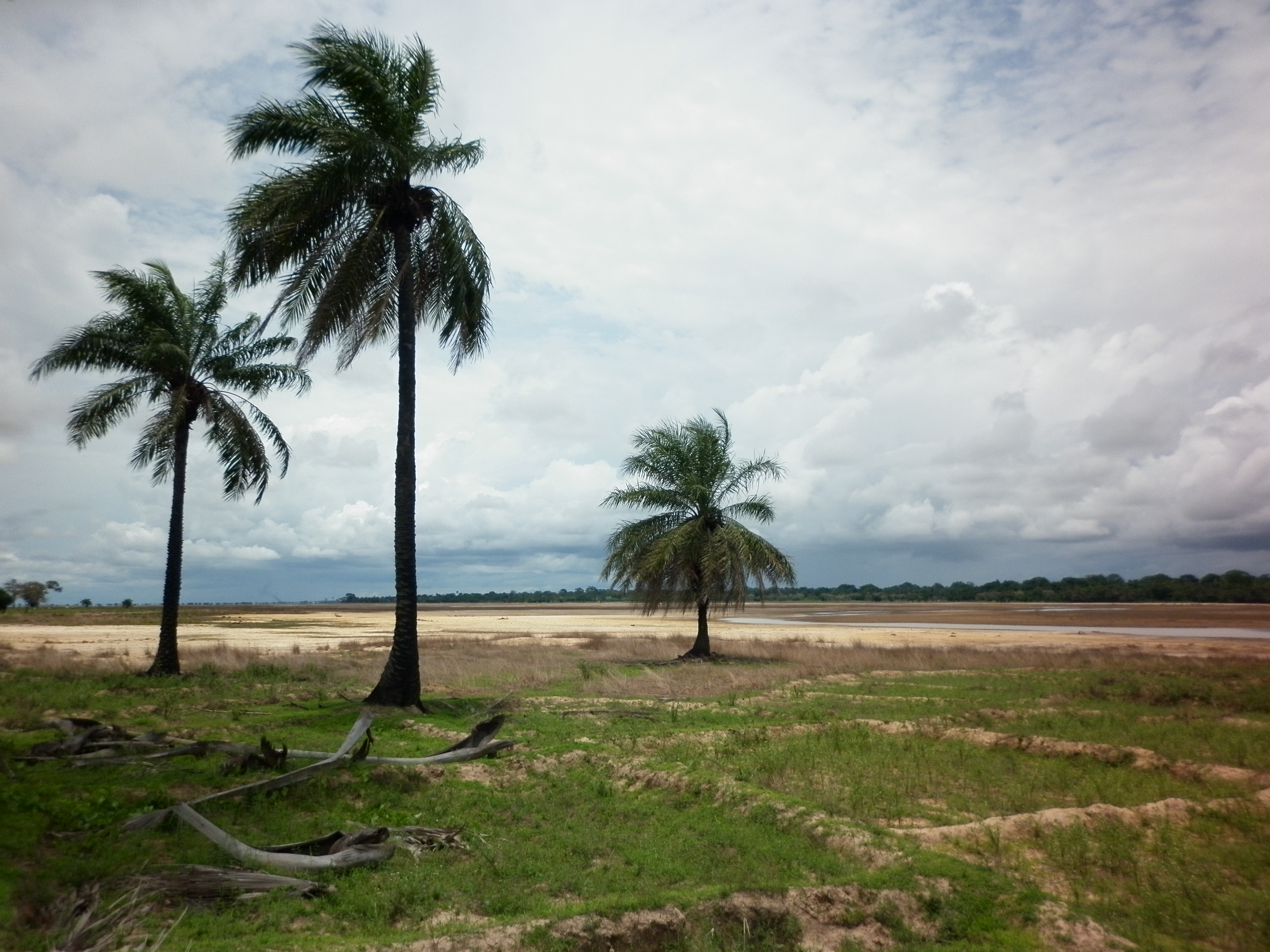
Rice fields in Bagaya

The village is located in the alluvium of the Casamance River.

Most families produce rice, peanuts, mangos, cashew nuts, millet, maniok, oil palm of coconut for private or local consumption.

Animals like chicken, goat and cow are much elevated. Milk is not used for human consumption because there is no cooling infrastructure, and because of the lack of transportation.

Vegetables are not sufficiently produced or eaten. The meals are rather monotonous; two meals per day of rice would not be exceptional. In the morning people frequently eat millet. Meat is only prepared at feasts.

== Water and climate ==
Water sources are 20 m deep. There is normally one source for each quarter. The sources produce water during the whole year. Water is carried on the head. Drinking water and washing water is kept in separate barrels.

Rain is normally plentiful during the rain season of July–August. Rice is planted mid-August and harvested around Christmas and New Year. If there is not enough rain, then the rice cannot be planted, and famine occurs during the dry season.

=== Problems with the water supply ===
During the 80's the Senegalese Government approved an integrated project for the Tendouck region. In this project, an important activity was to provide drinking-water to the local community. A water tower was built in Mandégane to serve the villages of Bagaya and Mandégane. Today, 32 years later, after multiple promises the tower is still not in production. Sint-Ulriks-Kapelle sponsored in 2009 the connection of the houses to the public distribution net. People are anxiously waiting for the water supply to become available. Drinking salty water from the different small water pits is not an option.

== Projects ==
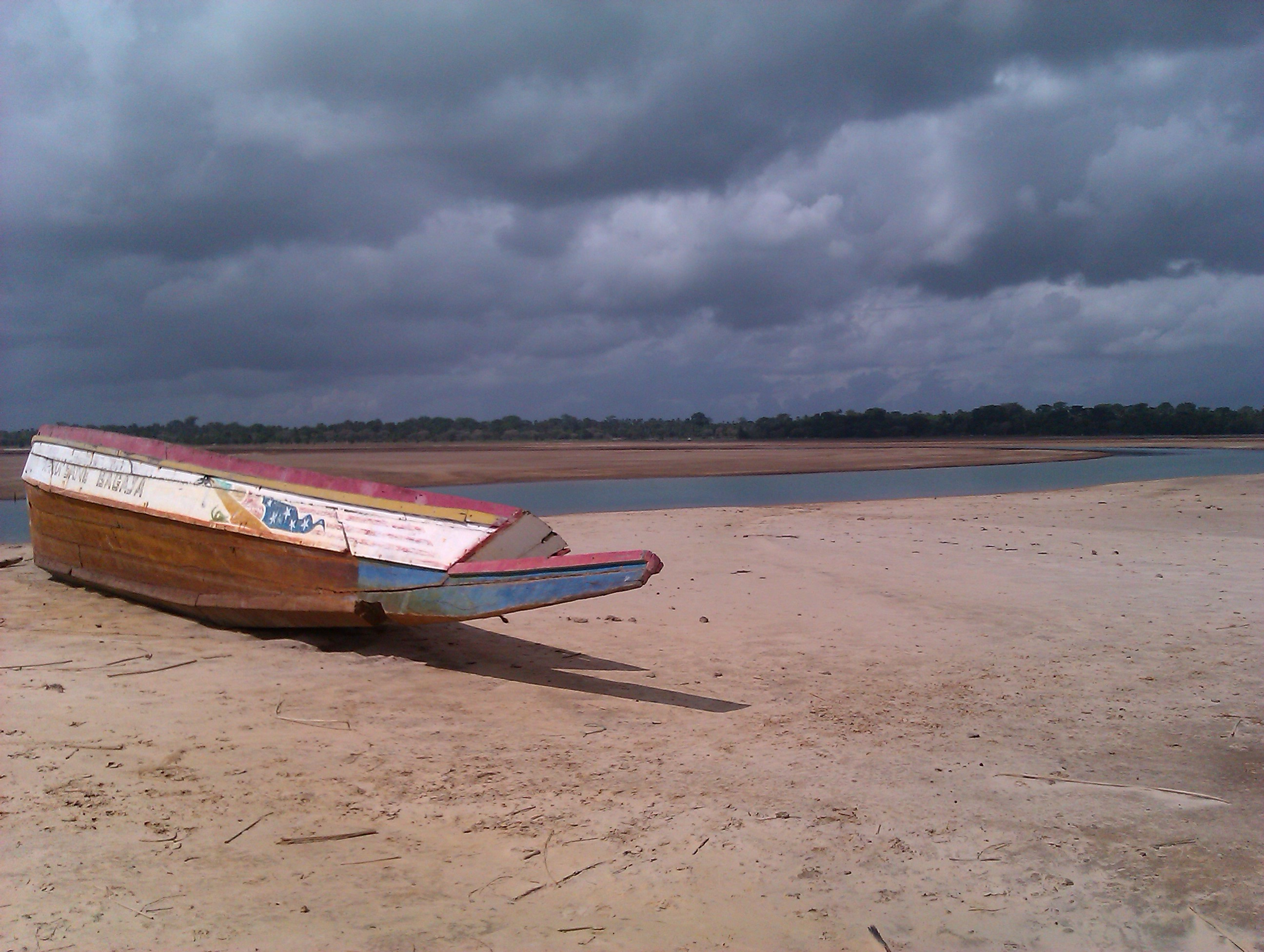
Canoe in Bagaya

Since 1989, Bagaya is twinned with Sint-Ulriks-Kapelle, that support multiple projects like: the school, the medical center, the maternity, the rice peeling machine, the mill, fresh water distribution, textile coloring, the Foyer des Jeunes.

The vegetable yard is an integrated rural development project supported by the NGOs ASRADEC, USAID and NCOS (Belgium) for the villages of Bagaya, Dianki, and Kartiack to stimulate agricultural activities like cultivation, education and product commercialization.

A project with a canoe did not succeed because the transport over the road has moved forward a lot during the last years. The canoe was much too slow, too big, and consumed too much fuel, so it was not economical anymore. A voyage to Ziguinchor, about 80 km, takes about 8 hours. Over the road it takes only 2 hours (about 55 km). A minivan can transport 10 people, but for the canoe, 50 passengers are required to pay the fuel and other costs.

In Affiniam a dam was built in 1988 in collaboration with China as a barrier to keep the salt sea water from spoiling the fields, and to be able to irrigate. Because the sweet water could not flush through neither, and flow to the Atlantic Ocean the salt water evaporated, and the fields salified.

The mangrove is completely dry now.

The local fishery has completely vanished.

Fish has to be transported from 50 km distance by trucks.

== Culture and folklore ==
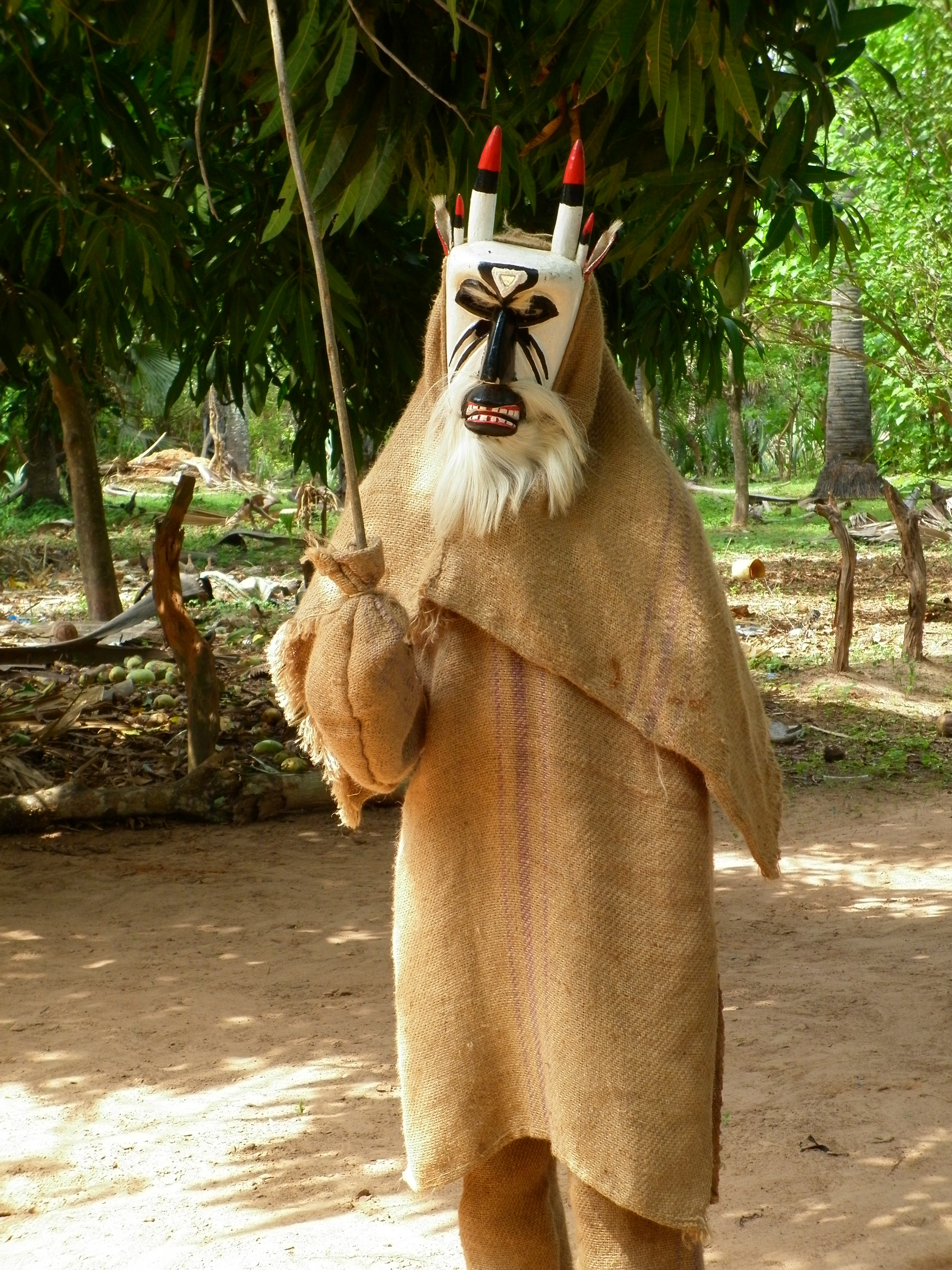
Samay

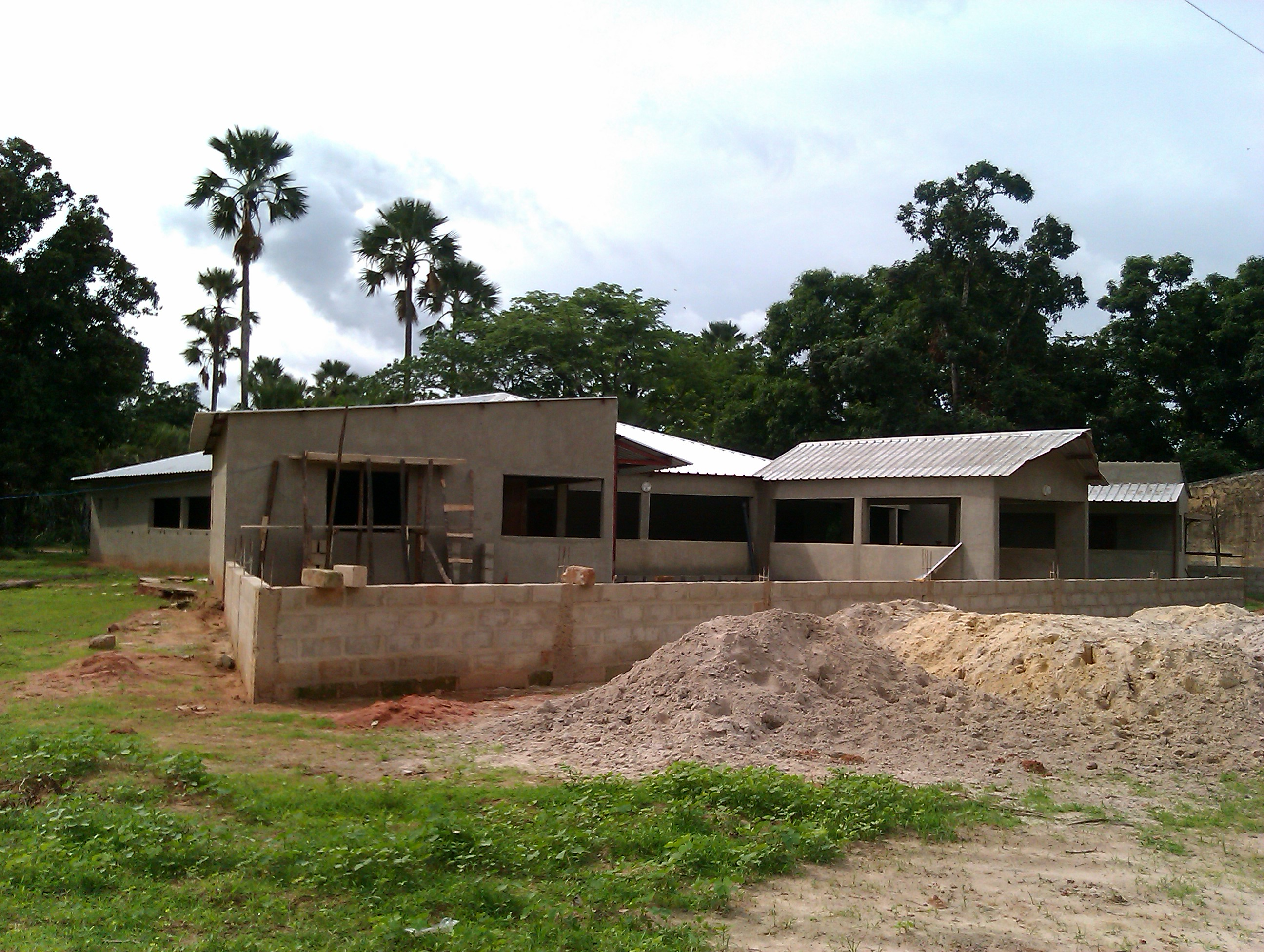
Foyer des jeunes in Bagaya

The Diola people are mostly Muslim, but some also practice their Traditional religion.

The local language is the Jola language.

Educated people can usually speak good French.

The community is strictly hierarchical, and managed by the village chief.

During folk festivals (Journées culturelles) people are dancing around mythological masked figures like the Samay, the Kumpo, and the Niasse.

== Human settlement ==
The main road goes from NE (Mandégane) to SW (Diatock). The quarters Énébané, Elegning, and Foutama are located on the main road. The other quarters are situated SW-W-NW or S-SE-E from the main road.

Orientation	Quarter	Subquarter	Place of interest
N-NE	Énébané	-	School, millet mill, rice peeling machine, textile manufacturing
E	Eléoul	Kambirane, Kassana, Thiès	Vegetables
S	Kagouth	-	Maternity, dispensary, forge
SW	Djinia	Elegning	Village chief, Foyer
SW	Djinia	Foutama	Football
SW	Djinia	Bassène	Agricultural project
W-NW	Kourouck	-	La Reine

== Traveling ==
- 450 km by car from Dakar via Kaolack and Farafenni/Soma (ferry in Gambia).
- 15 hours with a car ferry Aline Sitoe Diatta from Dakar to Ziguinchor over the Atlantic Ocean and the Casamance River
- Domestic flight Dakar-Ziguinchor with Sénégal Airlines
- 55 km by car from Ziguinchor

== Communication ==
There is no internet access. Fixed telephone lines are not available - still there is 1 single telephone booth in the neighbourhood of the village chief.

Mobile communications are commonly available be it very expensive for the local people.

== See also ==
- Mythology: Samay, Kumpo, Niasse
