= Religion in Senegal =

Religion in Senegal (Pew Research Center 2020)
1. Islam (97.6%)
2. Christianity (2.40%)

Religion and beliefs occupy an important place in the daily life of the nation of Senegal. The majority of citizens follow Islam (mainly Sunni Islam). In 2013, 6% of the population followed indigenous beliefs (mainly Serer), while 2% followed Christianity (principally Catholicism).

The constitution provides for freedom of religious beliefs and self-governance by religious groups without outside interference.

== Major religions in Senegal ==
According to "CIA World Factbook: Senegal" (2019 estimates), Islam is the predominant religion in the country, practiced by 97.2% of the country's population; the Christian community, at 2.7% of the population, and less than one percent practice Traditional African religions such as Serer spirituality, the spiritual beliefs of the Serer people.

According to the Berkley Center, "approximately 95 percent of the population is Muslim and the other five percent is primarily Christian or animist." Many scholars including Marloes Janson, of SOAS, University of London, posits that, in Senegal, Gambia, and many African countries where Islam is dominant, Muslim communities tend to syncretise Islam with Traditional African religions, a term referred to as "African Islam."

=== Islam ===
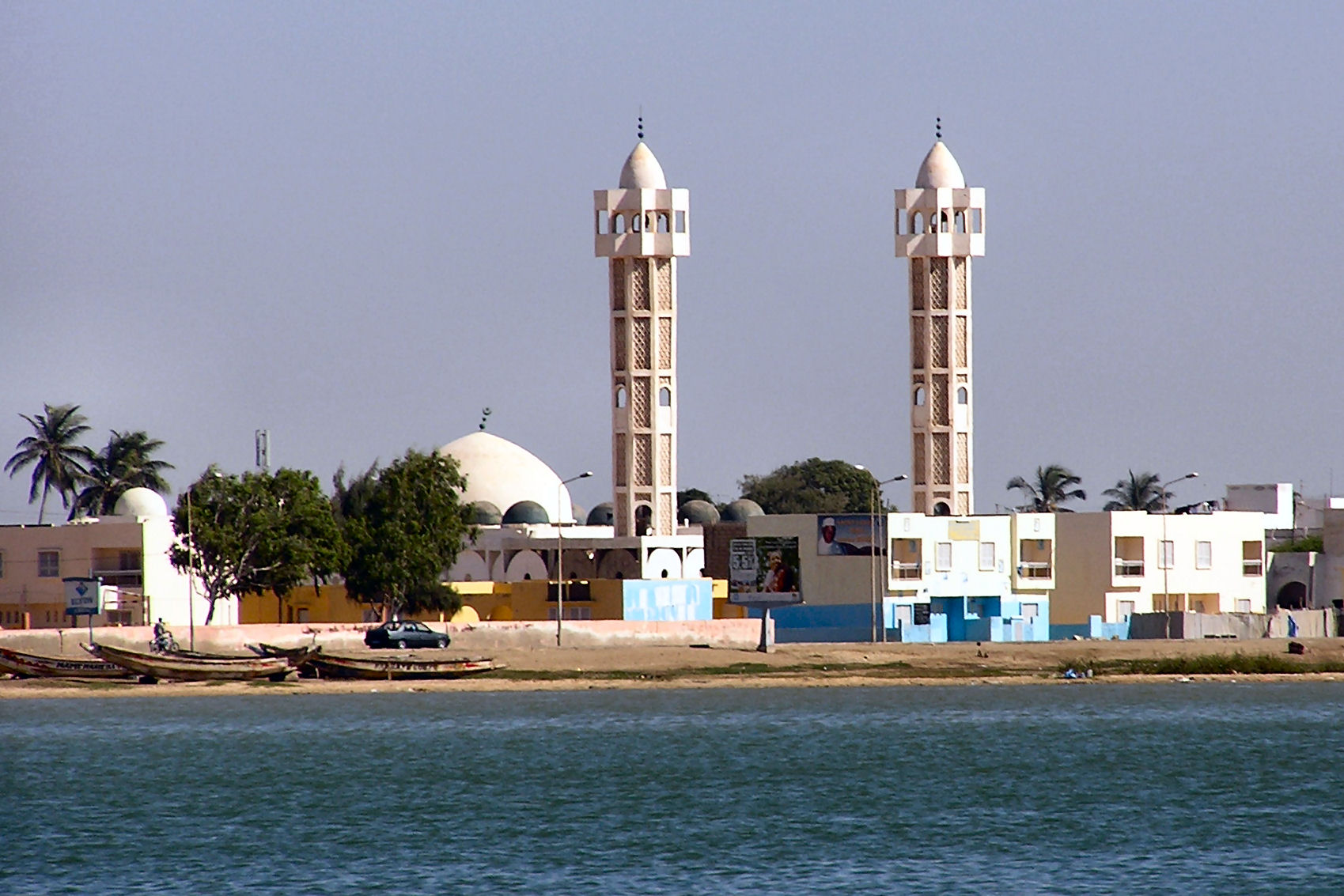
A mosque in Saint-Louis.

About 97% of the Senegalese population is Muslim, and many denominations of this faith are practised. Approximately 1% of the Muslim population practices Ahmadiyya. Though mainstream Muslims see Ahmadis as heretic.

Sufism is represented in Senegal by the following brotherhoods: Mouridism which emerged in Senegal and played a major economic role through peanut production during colonial times and more international traditions like Tijanism, Qadiriyya, and Layenism. More recently, the NabyAllah movement has emerged and constructed the Mosque of the Divinity in Ouakam.

The Layenes are a Muslim brotherhood based in Mahdism. This group originated in Yoff, a Lebou village that has become a commune d'arondissement of Dakar. The founder is Seydina Limamou Laye. He began his prédication May 24, 1883, at the age of 40, presenting himself as the Imam of "Bien Guidés" or "imamoul Mahdi." He taught and preached religious law and worship "clean and sincere," removed from the traditions that he judged were not conforming to Islam.

The Great Mosque of Touba, home of the Mouride Sufi brotherhood

Tijanism (Tarîqah Tijâniyyah) is the most important Sufi brotherhood in Senegal. In Senegal, the principal holy city of Tijanism is Tivouane, the home of marabout Malick Sy (d. 1922). Sy left a legacy of pacifist teachings. Il y a aussi Sokone Avec El Hadji Amadou Déme (1895–1973). Kaolack is another important city, for being the seat of marabout Baye Niass (1900–1975) who also taught a pacifist message.

The first propagators were Oumar Tall who tried to lead a holy war (1852–1864) against the French and Mouhammadoul Hâmet BA. After the 2002 general census of the Senegalese population, the followers of Tijianism constitute around 60% of all Senegalese, making it the most represented brotherhood in the country.

The Mouride Order constitute one of the most important brotherhoods in Senegal, and the most important Sufi brotherhood in Sub-Saharan Africa. The religious center of Mourides is the city of Touba, which houses one of the largest mosques in Africa. The founder of the Mouride brotherhood is Marabout Ahmadou Bamba (1853–1927). Each year, the Mourides commemorate the exile of Bamba during Magal, celebrated in the holy city of Touba. Each year, not less than two million people make this pilgrimage. Mourides constitute around 28% of the Senegalese population.

The Qadiriyya brotherhood is the oldest in Senegal, founded by the Sufi mystic Abd al Qadir al-Jilani in the 12th century. Qadiriyya constitute around 6% of the Senegalese population.

Shia Islam is the dominant religion among the Lebanese community of Senegal. Since the 1970s, the number of native Senegalese Shi'i Muslims has been growing significantly. They belong to organizations such as Mozdahir.

=== Christianity ===
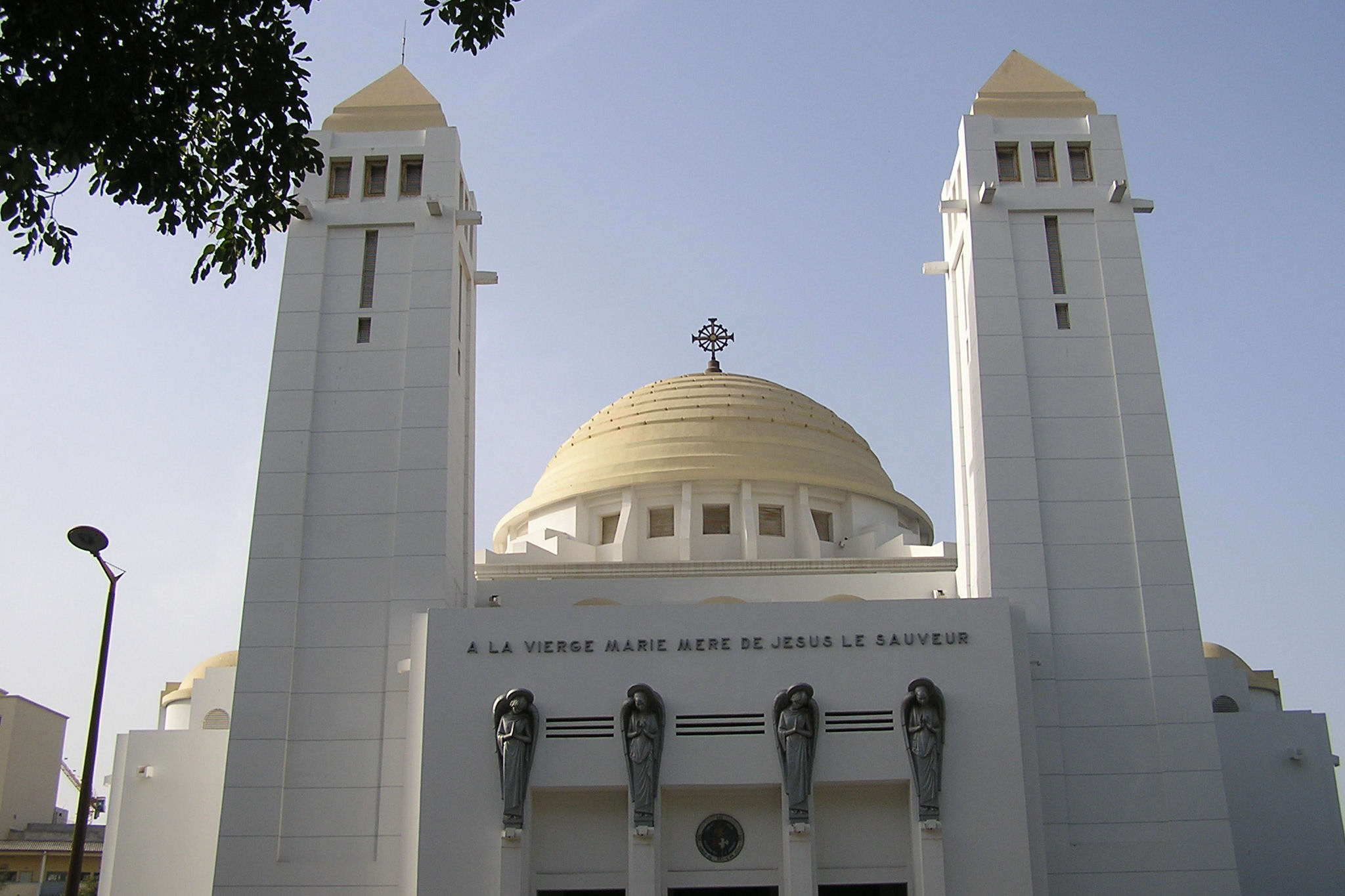
Our Lady of Victories Cathedral is an important Christian church in Dakar.

Primarily found in the west and south of Senegal, particularly in the Casamance region, they are also found in the large cities, such as Dakar and Saint-Louis. Senegalese Christians have a site of pilgrimage at Popenguine. The Dakar Cathedral was constructed at the beginning of the 20th century by father Daniel Brottier, founder of the Orphelins Apprentis d'Auteuil.

Protestantism is equally represented, among others, by the Protestant Church in Senegal.

=== Traditional African religions ===
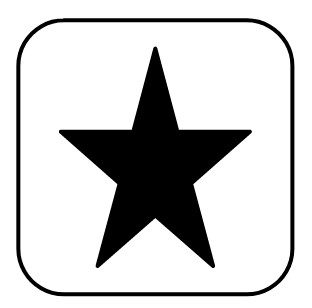
The star Yoonir - representation of the university in Serer cosmogony

Traditional African religions like the Serer religion (A ƭat Roog) are adhered to by devout worshippers of Roog – the supreme deity in Serer religion. The Serer ethnic group who adhere to the tenets of Serer religion (including those Senegalese who syncretize) honour the Serer pangool and have ancient rituals and festivals devoted to them. The religious affairs of Serer religion devotees are usually headed by the Saltigue (the Serer priestly class) which in ancient times was the preoccupation of the Serer lamanic class. Some of these religious festivals or ceremonies include the Ndut (rite of passage), Xooy (divination festival once a year in Fatick), and the Raan festival. Senegalese hold several ancient beliefs, such as small efforts of 'thanks' or demands, such as protection from water. They also place great importance on the Baobab tree, which is known as the "House of the Spirits." The baobab tree along with other sacred trees figure prominently in the Serer creation narrative. Among the Jola people, some religious festivals include the Samay, Kumpo and the Niasse.

== Youth religiosity in Senegal ==
Religion is an integral part of daily life in Senegal, and this occurs very differently for adults and youths. Though many standard practices such as the celebration of large Senegalese religious holidays like Tabaski maintain importance for Senegalese people of all generations, other practices such as daily prayer and abstinence from drinking and drugs take on different roles for Senegalese youth than for their parents. But along with youths who have liberalized their understanding of religion, there are many Senegalese youth who have made changes of a more fundamentalist nature. Many Senegalese youth are reinstating earlier understandings of Islam, in many instances incorporating religion into their lives to a greater extent than that of their parents.

=== Changes in religiosity ===
A notable sign of changing generational levels of religiosity is how youth have changed their interactions with the national political system. On one hand, an increase in religiosity of Senegalese youth has caused them to promote an increased level of religious involvement in political decision-making. Conversely, many youth-led political movements are associated with groups of young people who tend to deviate from the religious expectations of their parents, partaking in alcohol consumption as well as elements of hip hop culture. For example, the Y'en a Marre ("Fed Up") movement was developed in January 2011 in response to the government inefficiency and youth un-involvement in Senegal was and was almost entirely youth-driven.

On the other hand, many Senegalese youth movements have centered on increasing the role of religion in political systems, particularly at the university level. Many student organizations have been created to attempt to promote these traditional values to Senegalese public life and politics. These groups include the Hizbut-Tarqiyyah, and the Association Musulmane des Etudiants d'Afrique Noire (AMEAN). Throughout the 1960s and 70s this upturn in religiosity was seen through the building of new mosques, and an increase in attention on Islamic organizations and news publications.

These movements have many sources of inspiration, some local and some international. Scholars have claimed that it is sometimes a lack of access to resources that drive youth to use religion as a source of empowerment, as well as a justification for violence in certain instances. However, in Senegal in the 1990s Islamic revivalism originated largely from educated youths who had attended secular French schools.

The existing literature about youth religiosity politics in West Africa focuses on males, since they tend to dominate roles of religious authority in Muslim structures. This bias makes it even more difficult to make any generalizations about youth religiosity, since it would frequently be disregarding the sentiments of a large portion of the population. But it is apparent that religion serves a very different function for youth of this generation than it did for the previous one, in a pattern that was certainly passed down from the one before.

== See also ==
- Demographics of Senegal
- Islam in Senegal
- Roman Catholicism in Senegal
- Religion in the Gambia
