= Touray =

Touray is a common Gambian surname of Mandinka origin. As well as the family name Ceesay, it originally indicated the descent of its bearer from a Marabout, a West African Islamic dignitary.

Notable people with the name Touray include:

- Foday Kabba Touray, marabout from Kombo in what is now The Gambia
- Foday Ibrahim Sillah Touray, marabout from Kombo in what is now The Gambia, brother of Foday Kabba
- Ibou Touray (born 1994), Gambian footballer
- Isatou Touray (born 1955), Gambian feminist activist
- Josephine Touray (born 1979), Danish handball player
- Omar Touray (born 1965), Gambian diplomat
- Pa Dembo Touray (born 1980), retired Gambian footballer
- Sainey Touray (born 1990), Gambian footballer
- Shekou Touray (born 1945), Sierra Leonean diplomat

== See also ==
- Touré
- Turay
