= Muhammed Kanteh =

Gambian politician

Member of the National Assembly of the Gambia for Busumbala
- Incumbent
- Assumed office 17 April 2022
- Preceded by: Saikouba Jarju

Personal details
- Party: Independent
- Relations: Ousainou Darboe (Uncle)

Muhammed Kanteh is a Gambian politician who has served in the National Assembly representing Busumbala since 2022 as an Independent politician. He also served as Chief Superintendent of the Gambia Police Force. He is associated with the UDP.

== Gambia Police Force ==
On 26 January 2020, Kanteh was arrested and charged with "negligence of official duty" when he allegedly abandoned his post during the Three Years Jotna Protests to attend to two of his brothers in a hospital who were wounded in the protest. He pled not guilty, and was acquitted due to poor evidence which magistrate Peter A. Che described as "porous". He was a leading supporter of Adama Barrow after his election. Kanteh is an advocate for peaceful protests, and alleges his arrest was due to government crackdown on the 3 Years Jotna protests.

== National Assembly ==
In April 2023, Kanteh entered an altercation with the House Speaker Fabakary Jatta, where Jatta belittled Kanteh's qualification: “so-called legal background cannot understand parliament standing orders,”. Kanteh responded that the speaker's only qualifications were a Primary Teacher’s Certificate (PTC) and forming an alliance with the ruling party. He voted against making female genital mutilation illegal, citing concerns from Muslim constituents that the law might interfere with their practices. He criticized the arrest of opposition politician (UDP) Momodou Sabally, framing it as government crackdown on opposition.
