= Gunjur =

- Town
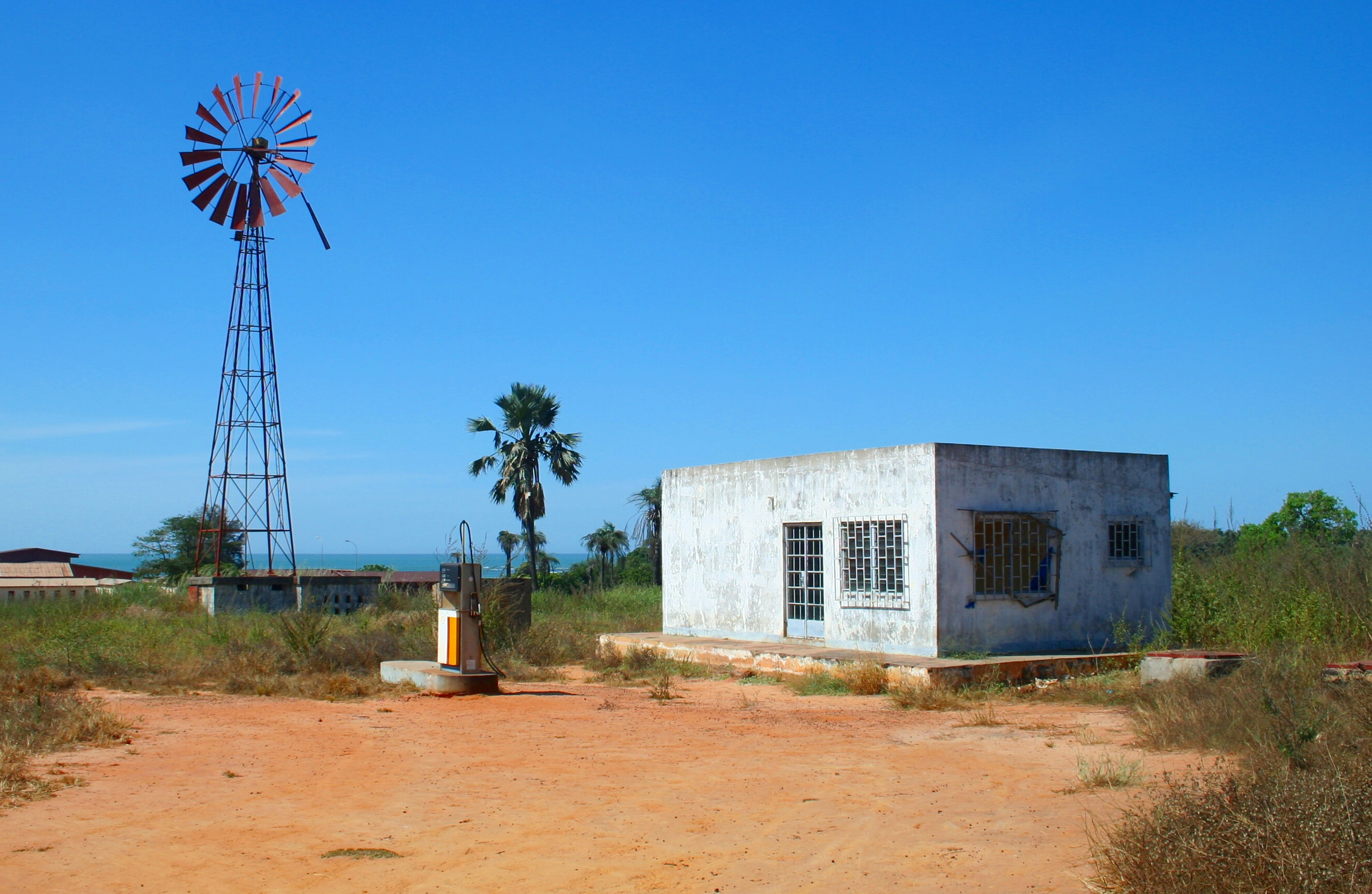
- Abandoned Gas Station in Gunjur

- Location in the Gambia
- Coordinates: 13°10′43″N 16°45′34″W
- Country: The Gambia
- Division: Western Division
- District: Kombo South
- Elevation: 58 ft (18 m)

Population (2009)
  - Total: 17,520 (est.)
- Time zone: UTC+00:00 (GMT)

Gunjur is a small coastal town in south-western Gambia. It is located in Kombo South District in the Western Division. As of 2009, it has an estimated population of 17,520.

== History ==
Gunjur was founded in the mid-18th century by the Darboe family.

The town became an important center of Muslim resistance to the mansa of Kombo during the Soninke-Marabout wars, led by Foday Kabba Touray. With his victory of Suling Jatta in 1855, Touray became one of the most powerful men in the area. His brother Foday Sillah succeeded him in 1868 and drove out or forcibly converted the remaining royal lineages, establishing his rule of the putative 'Kingdom of Gunjur'. Sillah also took over the leadership of the town from the Darboe family. In 1893 the British invaded and conquered Gunjur, incorporating it into the Gambia Colony and Protectorate.

== Economy ==
The economy of Gunjur primarily relies on fishing, agriculture, and tourism. Fishing is a significant livelihood for many residents, and the town's access to the Atlantic Ocean supports a thriving fishing industry. Agriculture includes farming activities, with crops like groundnuts, millet, and rice being cultivated in the surrounding areas. The town also benefits from the tourism industry, with visitors attracted to its serene coastal setting and cultural richness.

== Climate ==
Gunjur has a tropical savanna climate (Aw) with no rainfall from November to May and heavy to very heavy rainfall from June to October.

Climate data for Gunjur
Month	Jan	Feb	Mar	Apr	May	Jun	Jul	Aug	Sep	Oct	Nov	Dec	Year
Mean daily maximum °C (°F)	31.5 (88.7)	32.8 (91.0)	33.6 (92.5)	32.5 (90.5)	31.7 (89.1)	31.5 (88.7)	30.3 (86.5)	29.8 (85.6)	30.3 (86.5)	31.6 (88.9)	32.2 (90.0)	31.0 (87.8)	31.6 (88.8)
Daily mean °C (°F)	23.5 (74.3)	24.4 (75.9)	25.5 (77.9)	25.5 (77.9)	26.0 (78.8)	27.0 (80.6)	26.8 (80.2)	26.3 (79.3)	26.4 (79.5)	26.9 (80.4)	25.8 (78.4)	23.6 (74.5)	25.6 (78.1)
Mean daily minimum °C (°F)	15.5 (59.9)	16.0 (60.8)	17.5 (63.5)	18.6 (65.5)	20.4 (68.7)	22.5 (72.5)	23.3 (73.9)	22.9 (73.2)	22.6 (72.7)	22.2 (72.0)	19.5 (67.1)	16.2 (61.2)	19.8 (67.6)
Average rainfall mm (inches)	0 (0)	0 (0)	0 (0)	0 (0)	2 (0.1)	65 (2.6)	234 (9.2)	383 (15.1)	260 (10.2)	77 (3.0)	2 (0.1)	1 (0.0)	1,024 (40.3)
Source: Climate-Data.org
