= General O'Connor (disambiguation) =

General O'Connor may refer to:

- Arthur O'Connor (United Irishman) (1763–1852), French Army general under Napoleon
- Denis O'Connor (British Army officer) (1907–1988), British Army lieutenant general
- Douglas O'Connor (fl. 1950s–2000s), U.S. Army major general
- Edmund F. O'Connor (1922–2016), U.S. Air Force lieutenant general
- George G. O'Connor (1914–1971), U.S. Army lieutenant general
- Gordon O'Connor (born 1939), Canadian Army brigadier general
- Luke Smythe O'Connor (1806–1873), British Army major general
- Luke O'Connor (1831–1915), British Army major general
- Richard O'Connor (1889–1981), British Army general
