= Jatta =

Jatta or Jåttå is a surname and clan name. The surname originated from Prince Karapha Yalli Jatta son of Mansa Ali Djata Keita son of Mari Djata I establisher of the Mali Empire. Notable people with the surname include:

- Alassana Jatta (born 1999), Gambian footballer
- Antonio Jatta (1852–1912), Italian politician and lichenologist
- Assan Jatta (born 1984), Gambian football striker
- Bakery Jatta (born 1998), Gambian footballer
- Barbara Jatta (born 1962), Italian art historian
- Daniel Laemouahuma Jatta, Jola scholar and musician from Mandinary, Gambia
- Fabakary Jatta (born 1947), member of the Pan-African Parliament from the Gambia
- Ousman Rambo Jatta (born 1969), the Councilor of Old Bakau in Gambia
- Paul Jatta (born 1991), Gambian footballer
- Sidia Jatta (born 1945), Gambian politician, academic, and writer
- Jatta (novel), fantasy novel for teens with the heroine Princess Jatta 'whose life is not a fairytale'

== See also ==
- Jåttå Station, railway station at Jåttå in Stavanger, Norway
- Jåttå videregående skole, upper secondary school in Stavanger, Norway
- Jatta Ismail Khel, village in the Khyber-Pakhtunkhwa province of Pakistan
- Jatta (film), a 2013 Kannada film
