= John Colley Faye =

Gambian educator, clergyman, and politician

Reverend John Colley Faye
- Born: John Colley Faye; 25 February 1908; Bathurst, The Gambia
- Died: 10 December 1985 (aged 77); Banjul
- Spouse: Cecilia Pricilla Taylor
- Awards: Member of the British Empire (MBE)

Reverend John Colley Faye (1908–1985) was a Gambian educator, clergyman, and politician who played a significant role in The Gambia's early political development and educational advancement.

== Early life and education ==
Born in Bathurst (now Banjul) on February 25, 1908, J.C Faye is the son of John Charles Faye, a Serere employee of the Public Works Department and Gracee Jarra-Owens, a Wolof mother. Faye attended St. Mary’s Anglican School and later the Methodist Boys' High School (MBHS), where he earned a first-class teacher's certificate in 1927

== Career in education ==
Faye began his career in education as a tutor at MBHS, where he later became headmaster from 1932 to 1934. He subsequently transferred to St. Mary’s Anglican School, becoming headmaster in 1938. In 1938, he organised the Gambia Teachers’ Union and became its first liaison officer. His pioneering work in education, particularly in the upriver regions, earned him a Member of the Order of the British Empire (MBE) award in 1947. In 1942, he was appointed headmaster of the Anglican mission school at Kristi Kunda in the Upper River Division (URD), a position he held until 1949.

== Political career ==
Faye entered politics in 1940 when he was elected to the Bathurst Advisory Town Council as a candidate of the Rate Payers' Association. He later represented the Joloff Town ward in 1941 before resigning in 1942 due to his posting to Kristikunda. In November 1947, Governor Andrew Wright appointed him to the Executive Council to represent the Upper River Division (URD) (now Upper River Region), in recognition of his educational efforts in the region. In June 1951, Faye played a pivotal role in forming The Gambia Democratic Party (GDP), the first political party in the country. In October the same year he was elected to the Legislative Council as the leading candidate in the Bathurst constituency. Following the election, he was appointed to the Executive Council but was dismissed twice by Governor Percy Wyn-Harris, first temporarily in July 1952 and then permanently in September 1953 due to prolonged unsanctioned absences from The Gambia.

Despite these setbacks, he was reelected in 1954 and subsequently appointed Minister of Works and Communications, serving until June 1960. In 1960, the GDP merged with the Gambia Muslim Congress to form the Democratic Congress Alliance (DCA), with Faye as its leader. However, he lost the Kombo West constituency to United Party (UP) candidate H. O. Semega-Janneh. He later contested the New Town West constituency in Bathurst in the 1962 elections but was again unsuccessful.

== Diplomatic career ==
Following the 1962 elections, Faye was expected to be appointed to Parliament by Prime Minister Dawda Jawara, but Governor John Paul refused. Instead, in November 1963, he was appointed The Gambia's first High Commissioner to the United Kingdom. However, tensions with the People's Progressive Party (PPP) government led to his recall in December 1964. He opposed the PPP's support for The Gambia becoming a republic in 1965 and, although he initially supported the PPP-DCA merger agreement in August 1965, he resigned from the PPP the following month. He later joined the UP and ran unsuccessfully in the 1968 Bathurst City Council election.

== Religious life and death ==
After leaving politics, Faye devoted himself to the Anglican Church. While serving as Headmaster of St. Mary’s School he pursued ordination and became a deacon in 1947. His religious career advanced rapidly, and he later served as curate of St. Mary’s Pro-Cathedral, St. Paul’s Church (Fajara), and Christ Church (Serre kunda). He was ordained a priest in January 1973 and later became Provost of St. Mary's Cathedral in Banjul. In 1977 he achieved a historic milestone by becoming the first Gambian to be appointed Provost of St. Mary’s Cathedral. He retired from this position in 1982. Reverend John Colley Faye died on 10 December 1985
