= Foday Sillah (marabout) =

Marabout in the mid-19th century,

Fode Ibrahim Sillah Touray
- Born: Gunjur, Kombo
- Occupation: Marabout
- Known for: Leadership in the Soninke-Marabout Wars

Foday Ibrahim Sillah Touray, also spelled Fodé Ibrahim Silla Turé and generally known as Foday Sillah or Kombo Sillah was a Mandinka marabout, one of the leaders of the Muslim party in Kombo during the Soninke-Marabout wars that swept Senegambia in the mid-19th century. He succeeded his brother Foday Kabba Touray as leader of the Muslims of Gunjur in 1868.
