= Foday Kabba Touray =

Marabout in the mid-19th century,

Fode Kaba Touray
- Born: Gunjur, Kombo
- Died: 1868
- Occupation: Marabout
- Known for: Leadership in the Soninke-Marabout War (Kombo)

Foday Kabba Touray was a Mandinka marabout, one of the leaders of the Muslim party in Kombo during the Soninke-Marabout wars that swept Senegambia in the mid-19th century.

== Career ==
On 24 June 1855, the Marabout forces led by Foday Kabba attacked Busumballa, the capital of Kombo. Although the attack was driven off, the King Suling Jatta was shot through the heart and killed. With his ally Foday Ousmanu, Foday Kabba took control of much of the state. Upon Foday Kabba's death in 1868, his brother Foday Sillah succeeded him as leader of the Muslims of Gunjur.
