= Jangi Jollof =

Gambian film

- Directed by: Bakari Sonko
- Release dates: 2018
- Country: The Gambia
- Language: English

Jangi Jollof is a 2018 Gambian film inspired by a memoir written by Momodou Sabally, former Secretary General and Minister of Presidential Affairs in The Gambia. It follows Sabally's life story, and the struggles he went through to succeed in life. The film was produced and directed by Bakary Sonko.

== Cast ==
- Monica Davies
- Omar Cham
- Lamin Saho
- Ebrima Correa
- Mbaye Bittaye
- Bubacarr Touray
- Fatou S. Bojang
- Papis Kebba Jobbareth
- Sheikh Tijan Sonko

== Plot ==
A young man who works hard to educate himself through University as a result of him coming from a poor background, he made a difference in the society and country at large and inspires the young ones who comes after him through his story.

== Awards ==
At the Special Movie Awards (SMA) 2018, Jangi Jollof won two awards: Monica Davies won Best Female Actor, and Momodou Sabally won Best Story or Screenplay.
