= Sabally =

Sabally is a surname. Notable people with the surname include:

- Hawa Sisay-Sabally, Gambian lawyer and Attorney General
- Momodou Sabally, Gambian Secretary General and head of the Civil Service
- Nyara Sabally (born 2000), German basketball player
- Satou Sabally (born 1998), German basketball player
