= Jenny Hale =

Australian artist and writer (born 1959)

- Born: 1959 (age 65–66)
- Occupation(s): Artist and writer
- Website: Official website

Jenny Hale (born 1959) is an Australian illustrator and author who has published 20 children's picture books, including the Double Delight flap books with hundreds of thousands of copies in print. Her illustration styles range from naïve and cute (for toddlers) to detailed watercolour realism. Hale often hides characters and little jokes in her pictures for children to find.

== Biography ==
After completing Graphic Design at Randwick TAFE, Hale worked as a freelance illustrator, graphic designer and copywriter.

== Works ==
Hale works in pastel, watercolour, coloured pencil, and in Photoshop, concentrating on figure illustration. Her illustrations are often brightly coloured.

A voracious reader, Hale wrote fantasy stories from the age of 10. Her adult writing career was restricted to advertising copy until her fifth picture book, a maze book about a princess's quest. Little Frog (2007) followed. In 2009, Hale returned to her writing roots with Jatta, a darker fantasy. It explores the torment of a princess werewolf, who cannot control her bloodlust. The story includes black humour and a "multifarious plot that will have the reader engrossed to the very end", according to Reading Time.

== Children’s book reviews ==
Hale has reviewed for the Sydney Morning Herald Spectrum and regularly reviews for the Sun-Herald.

== Publications ==
=== Young adult fantasy novels ===
- Jatta (2009)
