= Turay =

Turay is an English transcription of a West African surname (the French transcription is Touré, another English one is Touray). Notable people with the name include:

- Andrew Turay, politician in Sierra Leone
- Edward Turay, politician in Sierra Leone
- Fatmata Turay, (born 1987), beauty queen who represented Sierra Leone in Miss World 2007 in Sanya, China
- Kemoko Turay, American football player
- Moses Turay, Sierra Leonean football player
- Samori Turay (c. 1830 – 1900), the founder of the Wassoulou Empire, an Islamic state that resisted French rule in West Africa
- Sitta Umaru Turay (born 1978), Sierra Leonean journalist and member of the editorial board of the Sierra Express newspaper

Media related to Turay (surname) at Wikimedia Commons
