= Soninke-Marabout War (Kombo) =

Gambian civil war with British involvement

- Part of Soninke-Marabout Wars
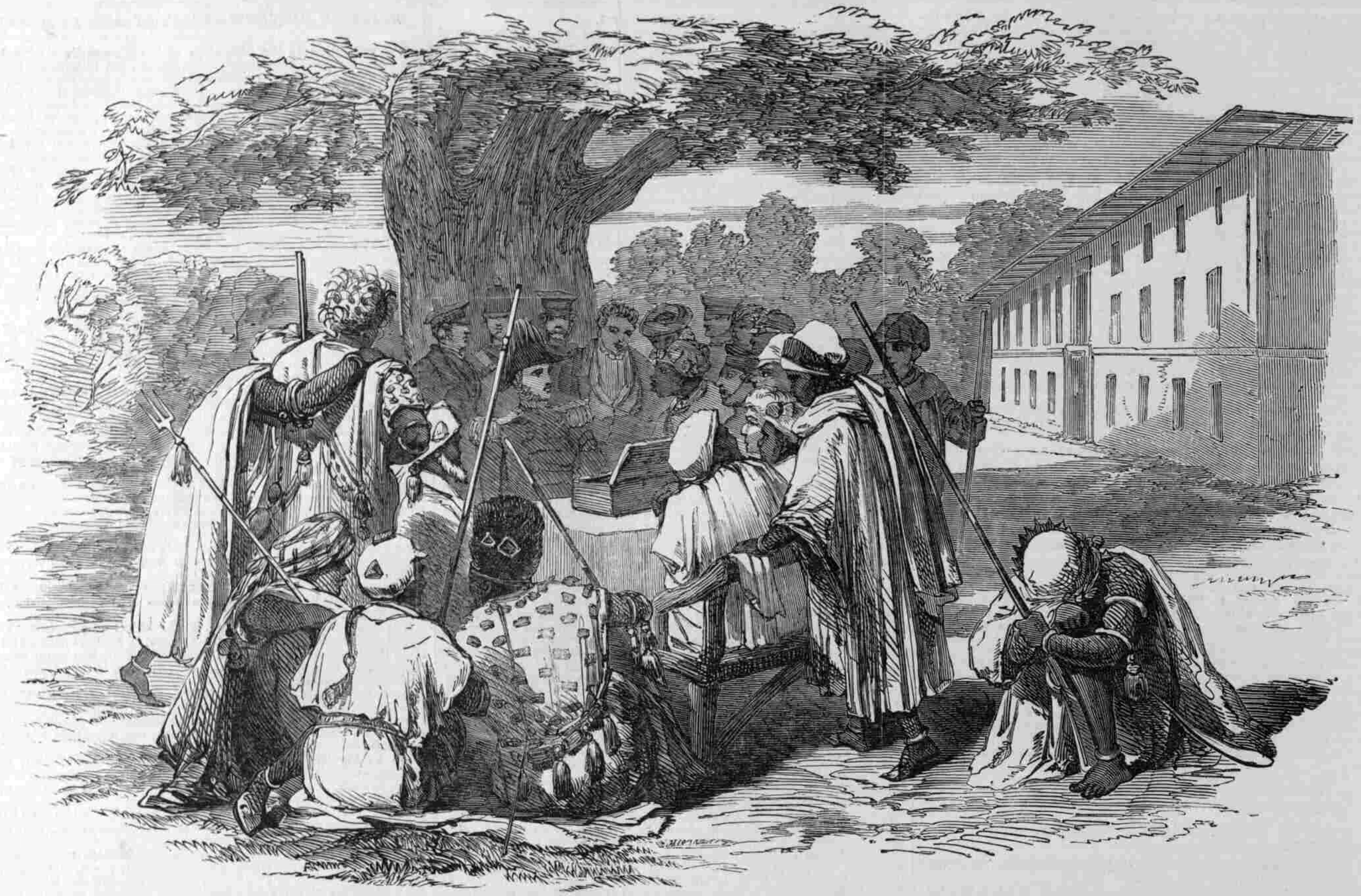
- Governor MacDonnell meeting with Suling Jatta, King of Kombo, in 1851.
Date	1850–1856
Location	Kingdom of Kombo
Result	Cession of Sabbajee and surrounding areas to the British; Negotiated peace between the Soninke and Marabouts arbitrated by the British

Belligerents
Kingdom of the Kombo (Soninke)	Marabout confederacy	(United Kingdom) British Empire; (Second French Empire) French Empire

Commanders and leaders
Suling Jatta	Fodi Kabba; Fodi Osmanu; Omar	(United Kingdom) Luke Smythe O'Connor; (United Kingdom) Richard Graves MacDonnell; (Second French Empire) Captain Villeneuve

Units involved
Kombo soldiers	Marabout soldiers	West India Regiments; Gambia Militia; French Marines; Assorted artillery; Native irregulars

The Soninke-Marabout War of 1850 to 1856 was a civil war between factions of the Kingdom of Kombo in the Gambia. The war resulted from a dispute between the Soninke people – pagans who were the ruling class in Kombo – and the Marabouts – a radical Muslim group with no representation in the governance of Kombo, partially inspired by Jihad. The British Empire, to whom parts of Kombo had been ceded by the Soninke since 1816, was initially reluctant to intervene. However, during the course of the war, the British intervened on two occasions. British forces stormed the Marabout town of Sabbajee twice, in 1853, and again in 1855, razing the town following the second intervention.

The conflict in Kombo was one of many Soninke-Marabout Wars across southern Senegambia, beginning in the early 19th century and continuing until the 1880s.

== Origins ==
Gray, in his history of the Gambia published in 1940, described the primary cause of the war being the dissatisfaction with the governance of Kombo. The King of Kombo was always elected from the leading families of the district, all of whom were Soninke. The Soninke themselves, however, only comprised the central portion of Kombo. The main bond between the Soninke was considered their kinship, and they were led, at the time of the beginning of the conflict, by Suling Jatta, the King of Kombo.

The Marabouts, a faction that at the time was growing in strength, were excluded from the governance of Kombo. They were considered strongest at Gunjur, a town that had been Muslim for a longer time than the rest of Kombo, and had itself effectively declared independence in 1840. They were also strong in the southern villages surrounding Gunjur, as well as in the northern part of the kingdom around the town of Sabbajee and Brefet. Fodi Kabba was generally considered the principal leader of the Marabouts.

== Early conflict ==
=== Confederacy formed ===
By 1850, the Marabout villages of the Kombo had formed a loose confederacy in order to contest the authority of the Soninke. There is some evidence to suggest that emissaries from North Africa and the Mediterranean coast had arrived in Senegal and the Gambia had been preaching a Jihad against non-Islamic communities.

=== Nature of the fighting ===
Demonstrations by the Marabouts began in 1850, but by the end of 1851 the disturbances had become serious and violent. The fighting between the two factions was primarily undertaken by mercenaries, most of whom were Serahulis, Serer, or Jola, who otherwise were not involved in the Soninke-Marabout dispute. Much of the fighting in this early stage took the form of a raid on an enemy village, the retaliation to which was another raid. However, it became clear that Suling Jatta was losing ground to the Marabouts, as he was outflanked to both the north and the south.

=== Marabouts ===
In particular, the Marabouts to the north in Sabbajee and Brefet were a threat to the Soninke. They had a number of supporters in Bathurst, the British capital in the Gambia, who supplied them with weapons and ammunition. The cession of part of Kombo to the British had not been popular among other citizens. In particular, Marabouts objected to Wesleyan Missionaries that now spread out among the Christian population of Kombo. A small number of elder Marabouts at Sabbajee objected to the war. However, they were both outnumbered and out-voiced by the faction that supported war. Gray has suggested that by this point, the war party of the Marabouts had been infiltrated by those with an anarchist drive, rather than a religious drive.

=== British response ===
The British colonial government at Bathurst was initially strictly neutral. In early 1852, Richard Graves MacDonnell, the Governor of the Gambia, issued a proclamation warning against people in British territory supplying arms or ammunition to either belligerent in the conflict. MacDonnell also informed the British government back in London that at some point it would be necessary for the British to intervene in the conflict. Though the British were under no treaty obligation to assist Suling Jatta, the Kingdom of Kombo had historically been good neighbours to the British, and observed the terms of their treaty. Faced with the choice of supporting the rightful ruler of the Marabouts, it was clear that the only option to restore law and order was to support the Soninke.

The British government was not prepared to give the necessary permission for MacDonnell to intervene at that point. However, as the months went on and the fighting continued, there was a growing concern that it would spill over to British Kombo. Lieutenant Colonel Luke Smythe O'Connor, who had by that point replaced MacDonnell as Governor, was instructed to use his discretion to put an end to the conflict. O'Connor proposed to Suling Jatta that he cede part of his unmanageable territory to the British, as long as the British quelled the rebels. O'Connor entered into negotiations with both the Soninke and the Marabouts. Both factions disliked the idea at first, but the Soninke eventually agreed as they saw no way of recapturing Sabbajee. A section of the anti-war Marabout elders also agreed, and on 24 May 1853 Suling Jatta and these elders signed a treaty whereby a strip of land, including Sabbajee, was added to British Kombo.

== Storming of Sabbajee (1853) ==
Storming of Sabbajee
- Part of the Soninke-Marabout War
Date	24 May—1 June 1853
Location	Sabbajee, Kingdom of Kombo
Result	British victory; Sabbajee and area becomes part of British Kombo

Belligerents
(United Kingdom) British Empire	Marabout confederacy

Commanders and leaders
(United Kingdom) Luke Smythe O'Connor	Unknown

Strength
603: 603 British, 4 artillery	3,000

Casualties and losses
40 killed, 84 wounded	Unknown

=== Preparation ===
Upon the conclusion of the treaty between the British, the Soninke, and the Marabouts, it was apparent that the majority of residents of Sabbajee objected to its terms. Within 12 hours of signing the treaty, O'Connor moved a number of troops to Jeshwang. However, the inhabitants of Sabbajee refused to back down, and so a large force was gathered. This included an armed party from HMS Teazer, 463 soldiers of the 1st, 2nd, and 3rd West India Regiments, 35 pensioners, and 105 men of the Gambia Militia. This was supported by a field battery consisting of two six-pounder field guns and two howitzers. On 30 May 1853, O'Connor's force marched from Bathurst to Jeshwang, eight miles (13 km) away. They made camp there and on 1 June advanced to attack the Marabouts in Sabbajee.

=== Storming of Sabbajee ===
Sabbajee was one of the oldest Muslim towns in Kombo. It boasted having the largest mosque in that part of Africa. More than a mile in circumference, Sabbajee was surrounded by a strong stockade, double ditches, and an outward abatis. It was believed that the people of Sabbajee could muster 3,000 fighting men, whose fighting ability was well known in the surrounding regions. Upon approach, O'Connor's force observed a large body of hostile fighters stationed around the mosque. The stockade was also lined with men, and a deep trench had been dug in the rear who could fire on any advancing British. O'Connor's force was drawn up in three divisions: the 1st West India Regiment, under Captain A. W. Murray, took the centre; the 2nd West India Regiment, under Captain Anderson, took the right; and the 3rd West India Regiment, under Captain Brabazon, took the left. At about 400 yards from the stockade, the field battery opened fire, and after a few rounds the roof of the mosque and the surrounding houses had gone up in flames.

Significant disorder then occurred in the Gambian ranks, and Lieutenant Colonel O'Connor took this opportunity and decided to storm the town. The right and left flanks extended in a skirmishing order, with the centre remaining in column, and the force advanced on the town. The fighters in Sabbajee kept up heavy fire from their stockade, over which a green flag was flying. The three divisions, which had advanced in a crescent, then rushed the stockade at three different points, and attacked the Gambians at bayonet-point. However, they discovered that the bulk of the defenders had retreated through the town. They had taken refuge in the nearby woods and were not pursued by the British.

=== Fanatics hold out ===
A "strong body of fanatics" still held the Sabbajee mosque, having extinguished the fire in the roof. They beat war-drums and there were cries of "Allah" from the priests. They kept up fire on the British troops as they entered the large central square of the town, where the mosque stood. The British soldiers were directed to occupy the houses enclosing the square and keep suppressing fire on the mosque until the rockets could be brought up. The second rocket that the British fired went through the roof, setting it alight again. Gambian efforts to put out the flames failed, and they quickly realised holding the mosque was untenable. Dozens committed suicide rather than surrender, and others threw themselves out the mosque and attempted to rush the British. Eventually, the fanatics in the mosque were either taken prisoner or killed.

== War continues ==
=== Involvement of the Moors ===
Following the successful British storming of Sabbajee, O'Connor attempted to mediate between the Soninke and Fodi Kabba of Gunjur, the Marabout leader. However, his attempts were unsuccessful, so fighting continued. During the next two years, the Marabouts gained strength, despite ostensibly losing Sabbajee. Haji Ismail, a Moor, was at this time travelling through West Africa preaching Jihad. A number of his agents personally visited the Gambia, including a Moor named Omar. Omar had been involved in Abdelkader's rising against the French in Algeria in 1847, and preached Haji Ismail's Jihad in Sabbajee. Omar had some military training and organisational skill, and in early 1855 began planning an attack by a large Marabout force against the British settlements in Kombo.

=== Attack on Busumballa and on British in Sabbajee ===
On 24 June 1855, the Marabouts attacked Busumballa, the current capital of the Soninke. Although the attack was driven off, the King of the Kombo, Suling Jatta, was shot through the heart and killed. Although this attack did not form part of Omar's plan, it is evident that many Marabouts were spoiling for the fight. In early July 1855, Fodi Osmanu, a Marabout resident of Sabbajee, proceeded to Jeshwang in British Kombo and kidnapped a woman whose husband was already being held captive in Sabbajee. A warrant was issued in Bathurst for Fodi Osmanu's arrest. As it was realised there may be some difficulty in arresting him, a party was formed to execute the warrant. This consisted of the Queen's Advocate (Lieutenant Davis), a group of constables, and two officers with a sergeant's party from the 2nd and 3rd West India Regiments.

The party reached Sabbajee on 16 July, entered the town, and arrested Osmanu without resistance. However, when crossing back through the town square, they were attacked by a large armed party in all directions, while Osmanu escaped. Forming a square, the British forced steadily retreated from the town, repulsing several attacks. During this engagement, both Lieutenant Davis the West India Regiment officers, were wounded. The party retreated back to Jeshwang and took refuge in the house of James Finden, the Colonial Engineer and Officer Commanding the Gambia Militia. However, the Marabouts pursued the party to Jeshwang, forcing them to make a quick decision on how to proceed. It was decided that Finden should rush to raise the alarm, while the rest of the party, with the wounded officers, should evacuate to Cape House near Bakau.

The party with the wounded officers had a running fight for a mile and a half with the Marabouts. At Bakau Konko, a former Sergeant of the West India Regiments named Sankey, and a number of other pensioners, came to the party's assistance and kept the Marabout advance in check. Sankey's stand was sufficient to dissuade the Marabouts from advancing further, and they instead plundered some British property in Kotu. Receiving the news, O'Connor mustered all available men and set out for the Kombo. Arriving at Oyster's Creek, both Finden's house and the village of Jeshwang were seen to be in flames. O'Connor was able to find the three wounded officers at Cape St. Mary's on the evening of 16 July, and also met up with 25 pensioners under Sergeant Sankey.

== Storming of Sabbajee (1855) ==
Storming of Sabbajee
- Part of the Soninke-Marabout War
Date	16 July—4 August 1855
Location	Sabbajee, Kingdom of Kombo
Result	Initial British attack repulsed; Second attack by Franco-British force successful

Belligerents
(United Kingdom) British Empire; (Second French Empire) French Empire; Kingdom of Barra	Marabout confederacy

Commanders and leaders
(United Kingdom) Luke Smythe O'Connor; (United Kingdom) Sergeant Sankey; (Second French Empire) Captain Villeneuve; (Second French Empire) Lieutenant Morel	Omar

Strength
960: 265 British, 4 artillery; 120 French, 3 artillery; 600 irregular natives	Unknown

Casualties and losses
British: 40 killed, 84 wounded	Unknown

=== O'Connor's first attack ===
Early on the morning of 17 July, the whole force, which totaled 266 men, marched on Sabbajee, meeting no resistance until it arrived at the woods of Bakkow. To reach the town, it was necessary to proceed through the wood, which only had one single bush path. Before entering, O'Connor directed that rockets should be fired into the trees to see if any enemy were lying in wait.

Upon entering the wood, the British were immediately fired upon from all directions. The units of the West India Regiments, who were in the vanguard, immediately returned fire. The militia had been split in two, one acting as support to the regulars, and another acting as a reserve in the rear. The militia in the reserve, upon the beginning of the engagement, retreated without orders and without engaging the Marabouts. The militia in support of the regulars, upon observing the reserve retreat, fell back also, and in great confusion. Both units of militia retired to Cape St. Mary's, abandoning their wounded. The units of the West India Regiments still held their ground, but after half an hour, decided to withdraw also, as their lines of retreat were being cut off.

The Marabouts pursued the retreating British forces for over two miles, keeping them under a suppressive fire. The combined detachments lost 23 men in this engagement, with a further 53 wounded. O'Connor himself was severely wounded in the right arm and left shoulder. The news quickly reached Bathurst, which had been left defenseless and was at the mercy of the Marabout soldiers. Preparations for defence were made, with all "reliable" natives being enlisted. Some 200 total defenders were mustered, and a vessel was dispatched to the neighbouring French settlement of Gorée to ask for assistance. The chiefs of the Kingdom of Kombo volunteered their aid to the British, and a skirmish took place on 29 July between Kombo soldiers and the Marabouts in Bakkow, during which the Kombos lost 25 men.

=== Serer involvement ===
For the most part of the 19th century, the Serer people were subjected to jihadic expeditions by the Muslim–Marabouts of Senegambia. In the Serer precolonial Kingdom of Saloum, the Marabout leader Maba Diakhou Bâ and his Muslim–Marabout allies waged numerous jihads against the Serer in an attempt to convert them to Islam and to conquer their lands. For centuries, the Serer had resisted Islamization and adhered to Serer religion. Parts of modern day Gambia was historically referred to as Lower Saloum, and their respective chiefs paid tribute to the Maad Saloum (King of Saloum) who took residence at Kahone—now part of present day Senegal. During the Soninke–Marabout Wars, the Marabouts launched numerous jihads and surprise attacks in Saloum and other Serer lands causing severe damage and deaths. At the Battle of Nandjigui (1859) the Marabouts killed the King of Saloum Kumba Ndama Mbodj. In Serer Gambia, they killed the last remaining true chiefs of Sabakh and Sanjal (the Farank Sabakh and Farank Sanjal) and annexed both states, and called it Sabakh—Sanjal. These two states used to pay tribute to the Serer crown of Saloum. As well as killing the last true heirs of Sabakh and Sanjal, the Muslims also launched a surprise attack at Kaymor killing the Buumi Kaymor Biriama Jogop and many of the Serer inhabitants of Kaymor for refusing to accept Islam. When Maba and his Muslim–Marabout allies tried to launch jihad and subdue the Serer precolonial Kingdom of Sine, he was defeated at the Battle of Fandane-Thiouthioune by Maad a Sinig Kumba Ndoffene Famak Joof and slain to death. According to historians such as Abdoulaye Saine, that battle "was one of the most crucial battles of the Soninke–Marabout Wars." With such a long conflict between the Serer and Muslim communities, the Serer chief Cherno was among those local chiefs who offered military assistance to O'Connor by providing eighty of his Serer army to the cause. On 26 July, the coalition army and Cherno's band of Serer warriors proceeded to clear the Muslim enemy out of the bush country between Oyster Creek and Cape St Mary. For three days, there were sharp skirmishes, which resulted in the Serers losing a number of men but the Muslims were eventually driven back.

=== Anglo-French force forms ===
On 30 July, the French brig Entreprenant, under Captain Villeneuve, arrived in Bathurst. It brought with it 80 Marines, the entire disposable force that the French Governor of Gorée had at his command. The French had also brought with them three 12-pounder field guns, which combined with a 5-inch howitzer and three rocket troughs under the British, formed an artillery battery under the French Lieutenant Morel. With preparation complete, the combined British and French force marched from Cape St. Mary's on 4 August, assisted by an irregular contingent of 600 loyal natives. The Evening Mail reported in 1855 that the irregular contingent was actually only 255 strong.

No resistance was encountered until the wood of Bakkow, where the Marabouts showed in great numbers, and opened heavy fire on the British from the shelter of the forest. The contingent of natives, alongside the regulars of the West India Regiments, replied in kind to the rebel Marabouts. The rebel Marabouts made repeated attacks on the flanks, and even at one point threatened the rear. Shells and rockets were bombarded into the wood, and the village of Bakkow, which had been occupied by the enemy, was burned. It took two hours of tough fighting, during which the West India Regiments repulsed four flank attacks with their bayonets, before the force could make it through the passage.

=== Second storming of Sabbajee ===
Having made it through the wood, the force emerged on the plain of Sabbajee. The plain was a sandy level with some scant growth of Guinea grass and dotted with clumps of dwarf palm. The British guns were placed in a position to fire on the stockade, and began firing with precision. After only firing a few rounds, a large body of Marabouts from Brufut made a sudden attack on the British flank, charging with brandished scimitars. This attack was met by a party of French Marines and detachments from the 1st and 2nd West India Regiments, who fired a volley at very close range before engaging at bayonet point. They were able to quickly route the Marabouts, who took refuge in a neighbouring copse. West India Regiment troops then advanced in skirmishing order to dislodge the Brufut Marabouts and drive them further away.

After a bombardment of an hour and a half, little further was gained, as the Marabouts extinguished fires as fast as they were ignited, and ammunition was being exhausted. O'Connor resolved to take the stockade by storm. Detachments from the West India Regiments formed the centre, with the French Marines being on each flank. The force dashed forward in the face of heavy volleys from the stockade. The force quickly made it under the stockade, which stood 18 feet (5.5 m) high, having no ladders for scaling it. The Marabouts kept up the fire on the troops during this brief respite, and cut at the feet and legs of the soldiers through the bottom of the stockade. The British then opened fire on the Marabouts through their own loopholes in the stockade, while others clambered over the stockade and effected an entrance.

Following this, the Marabouts offered little resistance, and soon fled through the town, where they were pursued and shot down by the irregular contingent, who had been sent to cut off their retreat. The Marabouts incurred very heavy losses, and the ditch behind the stockade was full of their dead. The loss of the combined Franco-British force, excluding the irregulars, came to 17 killed and 31 wounded. Inside the stockade, the 1st West India Regiment captured two kettledrums, one a war-drum, and the other a death-drum. The Evening Mail in 1855 reported the loss of the Marabouts at around 1,500. As well as wounds sustained by O'Connor and Lieutenant Armstrong, other British casualties included Staff-Surgeon Hendley and Colonel Finden of the Gambia Militia. Captain De Grigny of the Gambia Militia was killed, while the French lost a sergeant. Entreprenant left on 8 August, exchanging a 21-gun-salute with HMS Myrmidon that had just arrived.

== Negotiated peace ==
Following the destruction of parts of Sabbajee, the inhabitants were forbidden from rebuilding for a number of years. A fence was built around the town to prevent desecration of the ancestral tombs of the Marabouts. The majority of the inhabitants moved to Gunjur, where they reinforced Fodi Kabba's forces. Omar managed to escape the town at the time of the assault and fled from the Gambia. Haji Ismail, whose Jihad had spurred on the Marabouts, was captured by the French in Casamance and deported to Cayenne. As a result of the Storming, the Marabouts were no longer able to rely on outside aid in their war effort. The war, however, continued on for another year.

O'Connor at one point considered an offensive attack on Gunjur, but decided that he lacked the numbers for such an assault. The Soninke and Marabouts were therefore left by the British to fight out the conflict. All the colonial government in Bathurst did was more strongly enforce the ban on supplying arms to either side. There were growing disputes within the Soninke, as Suling Jatta's successor died suddenly and there were accusations that they had been poisoned. A dispute followed between the ruling families of Busumballa and Yundum over the successor. The matter eventually went in favour of the ruling family of Yundum. This affair gave the Marabouts new impetus in the war, but this was quickly checked by growing poverty among the Marabouts as a result of the constant interruption to agriculture and trade.

As a result of this stalemate, the Marabouts sent emissaries to Demba Sonko, King of Barra, to request his mediation with the British government. O'Connor invited the leading Marabout chiefs to Bathurst to discuss the terms upon which he would arrange a peace with the Soninke. On 17 April 1856, the chiefs signed a convention where the promised to attempt to maintain peace among the Marabout villages. The Soninke were then invited and on 26 April signed a convention on similar terms.

== See also ==
- History of Gambia
- History of Senegal
- Battle of Logandème
