= Protestant Church in Senegal =

- Classification: Protestant
- Orientation: Reformed
- Associations: World Communion of Reformed Churches
- Origin: 1972
- Congregations: 4

The Protestant Church in Senegal (French: Eglise protestante du Sénégal) is a Reformed Protestant Christian denomination in Senegal. It is a member of the World Communion of Reformed Churches. Its headquarters are located in Dakar.

== History ==
The Paris Evangelical Missionary Society moved to Senegal in 1863 to do mission among Muslims. In 1972, the Protestant Church of Senegal (EPS) was founded. In 2015, it would have 4 churches and 1,000 members.

== See also ==
Religion in Senegal
