= Sint-Ulriks-Kapelle =

Village and deelgemeente of Dilbeek, Belgium

Coordinates: 50°52′48″N 4°13′06″E

Sint-Ulriks-Kapelle is a village and deelgemeente of Dilbeek, Belgium.

== History ==
Historically, Sint-Ulriks-Kapelle was a part of the Land of Asse.

Together with Dilbeek, Groot-Bijgaarden, Itterbeek, Schepdaal and Sint-Martens-Bodegem, it has formed the municipality of Dilbeek since 1 January 1977.

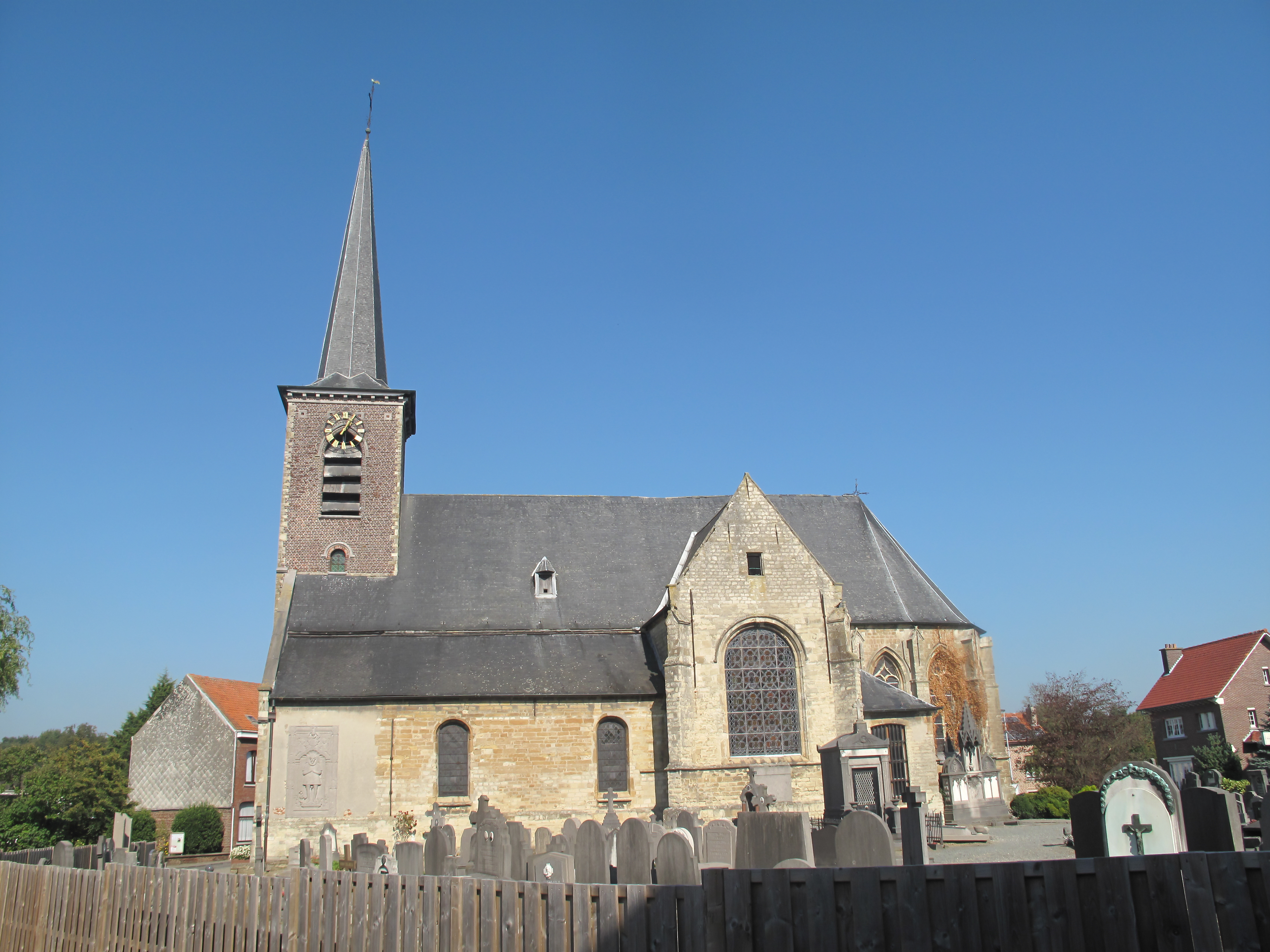
Sint Ulriks Kapelle, church

== Geography ==
Sint-Ulriks-Kapelle has 1,633 inhabitants and consists of 486 hectares (1,200 acres). The height above sea level varies between 20–50 metres (66–164 ft).

== Attractions ==
- Sint-Ulrik Church
- The neo-classical Castle La Motte: built in 1773 by the architect Laurent-Benoît Dewez, now used as a cultural centre.
- Castle Nieuwermolen
- Brewery Girardin: an authentic lambic brewery

== Education ==
- Klein klein kleutertje (nursery school)
- De Kriebel (primary school)

== Bagaya-Kapelle ==
Since 1989, Sint-Ulriks-Kapelle is twinned with Bagaya, a village in the Casamance, in the south of Senegal. The goal is to bring the two communities closer together and to support several local development projects.
