= Touré =

Touré is the French transcription of a West African surname (English transcriptions are Turay and Touray). The clan existed as kings of Zaghari on the middle Niger before the Moroccan invasion of the Songhai Empire. A theory of their origin holds that the Touré are descended from the "Roum," pre-Arab North African soldiers, and local women.

== People ==
Notable people with the name include:

- Touré (born 1971), American novelist and music journalist
- Adama Touré (1936–2012), Burkinabé politician and educator
- Ahmed Touré (born 1987), Ivorian footballer
- Ahmed Sékou Touré (1922–1984), Guinean politician, first president of Guinea
- Aïda Touré, Gabonese poet, artist and composer
- Al Hassan Toure, Australian footballer
- Alhassane Touré (born 1984), Malian footballer
- Ali Farka Touré (1939–2006), Malian musician
- Alioune Touré (born 1978), French footballer
- Almamy Touré (born 1996), Malian footballer
- Amadou Touré (born 1982), Burkina Faso footballer
- Amadou Toumani Touré (1948–2020), Malian politician
- Aminatou Maïga Touré, Nigerian diplomat
- Ansu Toure (born 1981), Liberian footballer
- Askia M. Touré (born 1938), American poet and essayist
- Assimiou Touré (born 1988), Togolese footballer
- Bako Touré (1939–2001), Malian footballer
- Bassala Touré (born 1976), Malian footballer
- Bassary Touré, Malian economist and politician
- Birama Touré (born 1992), Malian footballer
- Cheikh Touré (born 1970), French athlete (long jump)
- Chérif Touré Mamam (born 1978), Togolese footballer
- Clémentine Touré (born 1977), Ivorian footballer and football manager
- Demba Touré (born 1984), Senegalese footballer
- Djibril Fandjé Touré (born 2002), Guinean footballer
- Doudou Touré (born 1991), Mauritanian footballer
- Hamadoun Touré, Malian diplomat
- Hervé Touré (born 1982), French basketball player
- Ibrahim Touré (1985–2014), Ivorian footballer
- Ibrahima Touré (born 1985), Senegalese footballer
- Ilane Touré (born 2006), French footballer
- José Touré (born 1961), French footballer
- Karidja Touré (born 1994), French actress
- Kolo Touré (born 1981), Ivorian footballer
- Larsen Touré (born 1984), Guinean footballer
- Mamignan Touré (born 1994), French basketball player
- Mohamed Touré (footballer, born 1997), Portuguese footballer
- Mohamed Touré (footballer, born 2004), Australian footballer
- Mohamed Touré (footballer, born 2005), Guinean footballer
- Musa Toure (born 2005), Australian footballer
- Samori Toure (American football) (born 1998), American football player
- Samory Touré (c. 1830–1900), founder of the Wassoulou Empire
- Sanoussi Touré (born c.1950), Malian politician
- Sékou Touré (1934–2003), Ivorian footballer
- Sidi Touré (born 1959), Malian singer and songwriter
- Sidya Touré (born 1945), Guinean politician
- Soumane Touré (1948–2021), Burkinabé trade unionist
- Thomas Touré (born 1993), Ivorian footballer
- Vieux Farka Touré (born 1981), Malian musician
- Yaya Touré (born 1983), Ivorian footballer
- Younoussi Touré (1941–2022), Malian politician
- Youssouf Touré (born 1986), French footballer
- Zargo Touré (born 1989), Senegalese footballer

== See also ==
- Touré Embden (born 1966), Haitian American emcee known as MC Tee
- Touré Kunda, Senegalese music group
- Toure' Murry (born 1989), American basketball player
- Ture (disambiguation)
