= Suling Jatta =

King of Kombo during the mid-nineteenth century

- Kombo Mansa
- Reign: 1840–1855
- Died: 24 June 1855; Busumbala, Kombo

Suling Jatta (died 24 June 1855) was a Mandinka King of Kombo during the mid-nineteenth century.

In 1840, Jatta was persuaded by Sir Henry Vere Huntley, the Lieutenant Governor of the Gambia, to cede a northern portion of his territory to the British as a settlement for liberated Africans. This territory later went by several names, including British Kombo, Kombo St. Mary, and Cape St. Mary.

Jatta was the sitting King when the Soninke-Marabout Wars broke out in 1850. The war saw the ruling Soninke(Pagan) not to be confused with the soninke ethnic group side fight against the Islamic marabouts. The Soninke(pagan) faction was based in the towns of Yundum, Busumbala, and Brikama; the Marabouts were at Sabbajee, Gunjur, and Brefet. Much of the early war was fought via mercenaries. Jatta signed a treaty with British Governor Luke Smythe O'Connor in 1853, in which agreed to cede a further northern part of his territory, including the town of Sabbajee, on the condition that the British quell the Marabouts in the area. This led to the first Storming of Sabbajee in 1853.

Jatta was killed in battle on 24 June 1855, when a Marabout force under the Mandinka commander Foday Kabba Touray attacked his capital at Busumbala. His forces were able to repel the attack, but Jatta was shot through the heart and killed instantly in the fray. He was buried in Old Busumbala (Tungbung Ngoto), and much of his family dispersed throughout the region.
