= Jatta Ismail Khel =

Coordinates: 33°20′N 71°17′E

Jatta Ismail Khel is a village and Union Council of Karak District in the Khyber-Pakhtunkhwa province of Pakistan. It is located at 33°20'N 71°17'E with an altitude of 550 metres (1,807 feet).
