= Sambou =

Sambou is both a surname and a given name. Notable people with the name include:

== People with the surname ==
- Bassala Sambou (born 1997), English footballer
- Djibril Sambou, Senegalese judoka
- Emil Sambou (born 1994), Gambian footballer
- Gregory Sambou (born 1994), Gambian footballer
- Isabelle Sambou (born 1980), Senegalese sport wrestler
- Kaba Sambou (born 1996), Gambian footballer
- Massamba Sambou (born 1986), Senegalese footballer
- Pape Landing Sambou (born 1987), Senegalese footballer
- Youba Sambou (born 1944), Senegalese politician

== People with the given name ==
- Sambou Sissoko (born 1999), French footballer
- Sambou Traoré (born 1979), Malian-French basketball player
- Sambou Yatabaré (born 1989), Malian footballer
