= Luke Smythe O'Connor =

British colonial officer and administrator

Major-General Luke Smythe O'Connor CB
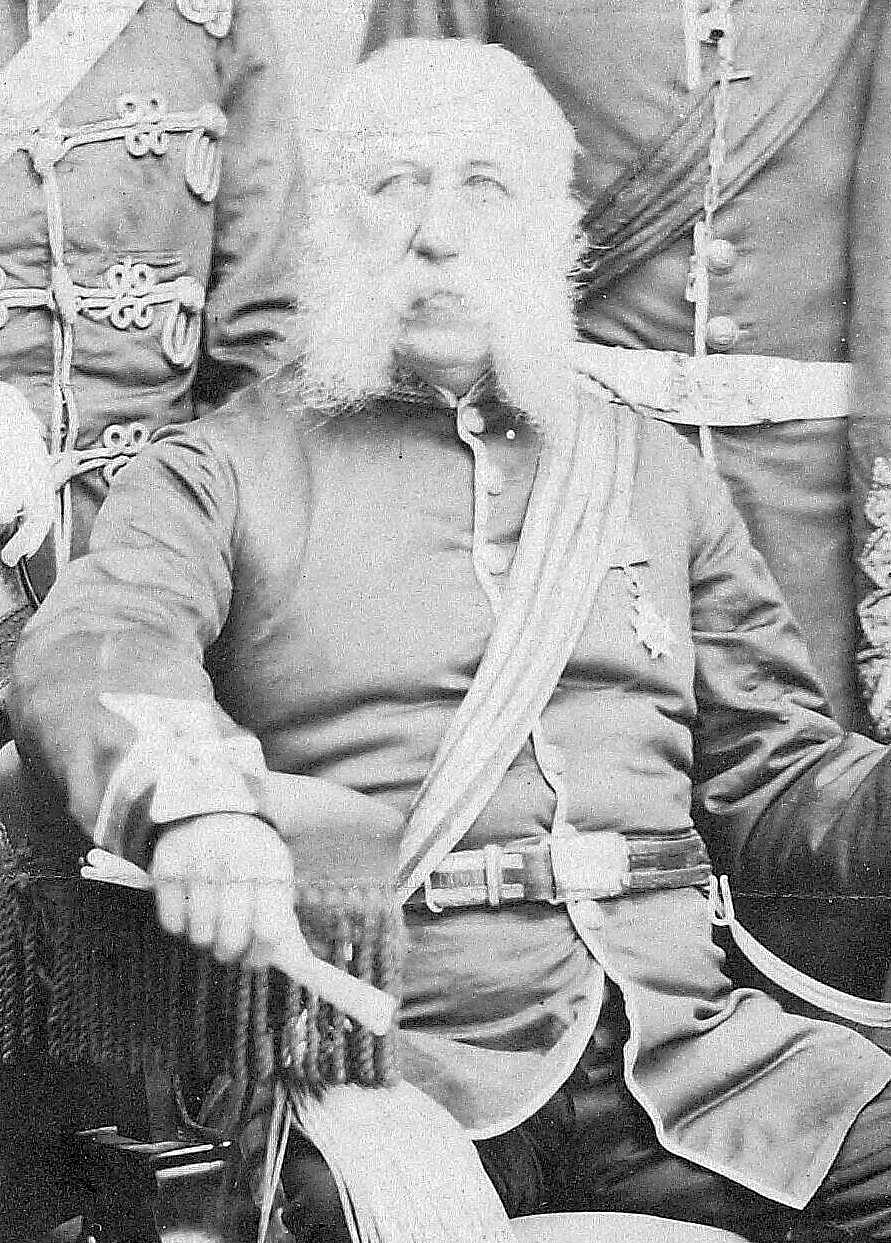

Governor of the Gambia
- In office September 1852 – April 1859
- Monarch: Queen Victoria
- Preceded by: Arthur Kennedy
- Succeeded by: George Abbas Kooli D'Arcy

Personal details
- Born: 15 April 1806 Dublin, Ireland
- Died: 24 March 1873 (aged 66) Dresden, Saxony

Military service
- Allegiance: United Kingdom
- Branch/service: British Army
- Years of service: 1827–1873
- Rank: Major-General
- Battles/wars: Soninke-Marabout War; Morant Bay rebellion

Luke Smythe O'Connor (15 April 1806 – 24 March 1873) was an Irish military officer and colonial administrator. He served as Governor of the Gambia from 1852 to 1859, and held senior roles in the Colony of Jamaica during the 1860s, including President of the Privy Council of Jamaica.

== Early life ==
O'Connor was born in Dublin in 1806.

== Military career ==
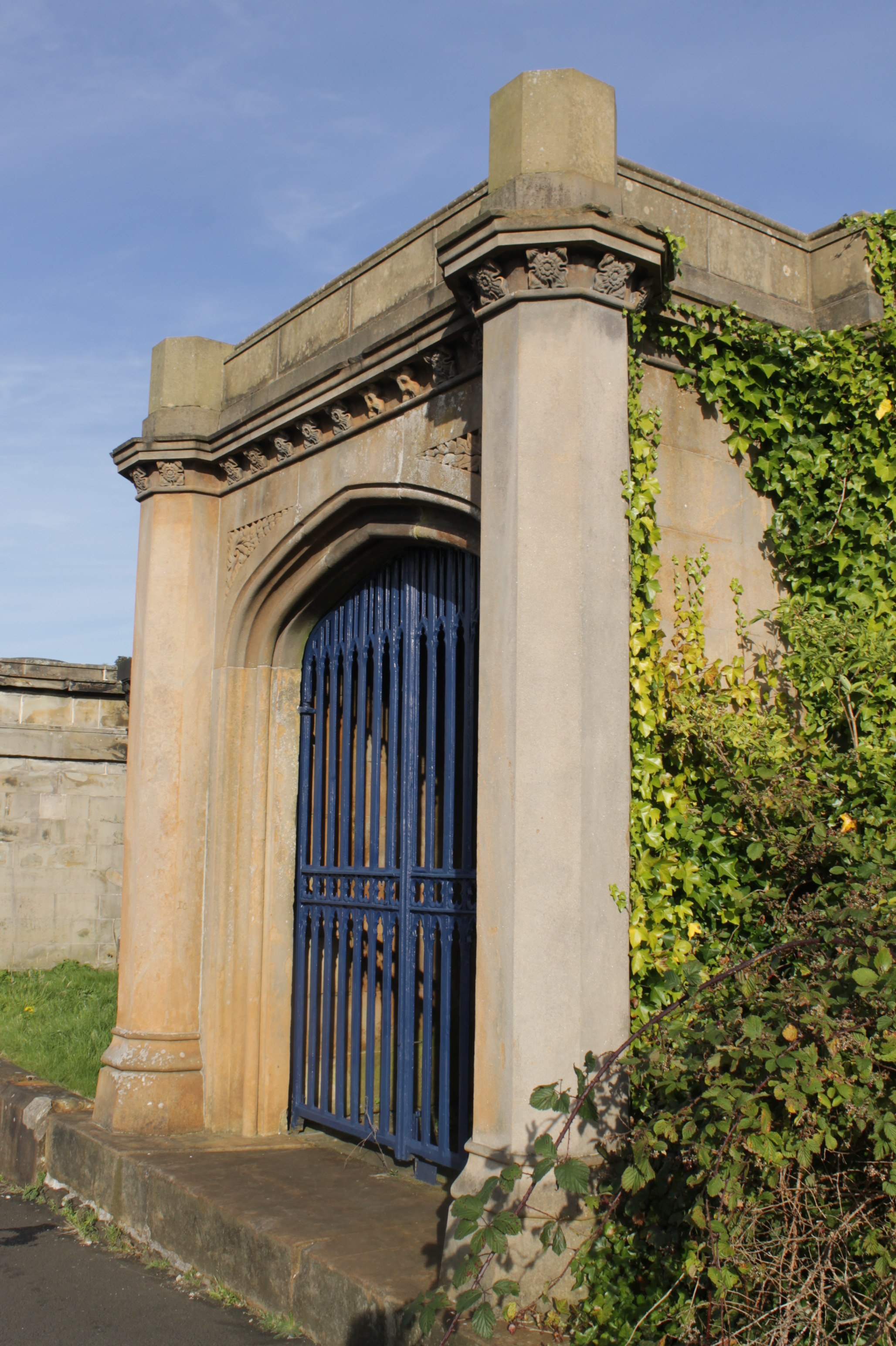
Smyth O'Connor vault, Glasgow Necropolis

O'Connor was appointed as an ensign in the 1st West India Regiment on 27 April 1827. He was promoted to Lieutenant on 22 March 1831, and Captain on 17 January 1834. In 1843, it was decided that the British colonies in West Africa should be garrisoned by the West India Regiments in turn, rather than just by the 3rd West India Regiment. O'Connor was dispatched from Barbados to Sierra Leone, in command of two companies of his regiment. He was promoted to brevet Major on 9 November 1846, and to a full major on 1 January 1847. In 1848, he was dispatched from Jamaica to British Honduras, where there were disturbances among the Yucatan Indians.

In September 1852, O'Connor was appointed as Governor of the Gambia, and was invested with command of all British troops in West Africa. He played a key role in the Soninke-Marabout War and commanded a force of the West India Regiments, black pensioners of those regiments, and the Gambia Militia, against Marabout rebels in the neighboring Kingdom of Kombo in 1853. In particular, he led the Storming of Sabbajee, which was a significant victory over the Marabouts. O'Connor was promoted to brevet Lieutenant-Colonel on 3 February 1853, and brevet Colonel on 28 November 1854. During the conflict with the Marabouts, known as the Soninke-Marabout War, O'Connor negotiated an attempted peace that acquired for Britain a significant tract of land in Kombo.

O'Connor led a joint Anglo-French force against the Marabouts again in 1855, having been personally wounded in an earlier battle, with shots through the left shoulder and right arm. In August 1855, he was able to storm Sabbajee again, raising the town and preventing the growth of Marabout forces in that area of Kombo. He was awarded Companion of the Order of the Bath for his role in this conflict. He was promoted to Regimental Lieutenant-Colonel on 21 September 1855.

O'Connor led British troops against Morant Bay rebellion in Jamaica in 1865, when several Europeans were murdered by rebellious Jamaicans. Up to 439 black peasants were killed in the reprisals led by O'Connor, some 600 flogged and about 1000 houses burned down. O'Connor was rewarded for his response to the rebellion by the Jamaica colonial government. On 24 April 1866, he was promoted to Major-General, and in January 1867 was President of the Legislative Council of Jamaica and a senior member of its Privy Council. He administered the government in this period during a brief absence of John Peter Grant. By 1870, he had become President of the Privy Council, and remained as an official member of the Legislative Council.

Although the connection is unclear, a vault on the north-west slopes of the Glasgow Necropolis memorialises O'Connor and contains some of his children.

== Personal life ==
O'Connor was married in 1856. He died of dropsy and atrophy in Dresden, Saxony, on 24 March 1873.
