= Balinghore =

Coordinates: 12°46′31″N 16°21′24″W

- Interactive map of Balinghore
- Country: Senegal
- Time zone: UTC+0 (GMT)

Balinghore is a settlement in Senegal.
