= Soninke–Marabout wars =

19th century civil wars across Senegambia

| Date | 1830–1887 |
| Location | Senegambia |

Belligerents
| Badibu; Kaabu; Kombo; Niani; Niumi; Saloum; Sine; Wuli | Local marabouts; Imamate of Futa Jallon; Boundou |

Commanders and leaders
| Jeriba (Badibu); Janke Walli (Kaabu); Suling Jatta (Kombo); Samba Laobe (Saloum); Maad a Sinig Kumba Ndoffene Famak Joof (Sine) | Fode Kaba; Maba Diakhou Ba; Alfa Molo; Almamy Oumarou Jalloh Jamboria |

The Soninke–Marabout wars were a series of 19th-century civil wars across southern Senegambia pitting the traditional ruling classes of various states, mostly animist or only nominally Muslim, against Islamic reformers led by the marabout class. French and British forces frequently became involved in these conflicts, providing them an opportunity to extend colonial power into the hinterland.

The conflict was characterized by a multi-ethnic Islamic coalition, primarily an alliance of Fula, Jakhanke, and Serahule (ethnic Soninke) clerics and warriors, seeking to dismantle the traditionalist Mandinka hegemony. The "Soninke" targets were ethnically Mandinka nobles defending ancestral customs against a coordinated reformist movement led by these allied Muslim groups.

== Name ==
In 19th century Senegambia, the term Soninke did not refer to the Soninke people ethnic group, but was a label for people that practiced traditional animist beliefs. These groups were mostly Mandinka rather than ethnically Soninke. Other terms for the traditional animist ruling class included ceddo and Nyancho.

== Background ==
Two principal factors laid the groundwork for the outbreak of widespread violence in Senegambia in the 19th century. The first was the increasing prominence of Muslims in traditionally non-Islamic states. Since the 17th century an increasingly arid climate had pushed Fula pastoralists further and further south looking for pasture for their herds. Among them were many Torodbe refugees from Futa Toro who progressively gained power and influence in the region. As a result, a series of Fula jihads across West Africa had established theocratic regimes in Boundou, Futa Toro, and the Futa Jallon. The Fula population of Mandinka states such as Kaabu, Kombo, Niumi, Wuli and others had also increased. These states were ruled by traditional kings whose legitimacy was founded on traditional animist rituals and, in many cases, a heavily syncretized Islam. Muslim marabouts had for generations been an important element of the social fabric, but remained politically dependent on the animist rulers. The Marabouts' desire to directly rule theocratic Islamic states led them to rebel against the traditional kings.

The second important factor was the Atlantic trade in slaves and various commodities. European demand for slaves had helped create a culture of endemic slave raiding and slavery in African societies, which persisted after the gradual abolition of the trade in the early 19th century. This institutionalized violence empowered local warlords. both Muslim and animist, while also creating widespread resentment against them. These leaders sold slaves to purchase firearms. When the European demand for slaves dried up, they turned to peanut cultivation to continue supplying their military forces. In addition, occasional European intervention in African politics undermined the traditional rulers' legitimacy.

== Wars ==
By 1818, the Fula-led Islamic states of Futa Toro, Futa Jallon and Boundou had created a 'holy alliance' against their animist neighbors. By the 1830s Muslim rebellions against the Soninke rulers had spread widely across southern Senegambia.

=== Kombo ===
In 1850 Muslim communities in Kombo, around Banjul, joined in a rebellion against the Soninke king Suling Jatta. The British soon became entangled in the conflict, using it as an opportunity to add additional territory to their colony. They stormed the Marabout stonghold at Sabbajee, but failed to quel the unrest. After years of low-level conflict, a combined British and French force once again attacked Sabbajee. This engagement did not decisively end the war in Kombo, but a year later the parties signed treaties to re-establish peace.

=== Kaabu ===
Kaabu, a federation of Mandinka kingdoms across what it now The Gambia, Casamance, Guinea, and Guinea-Bissau, was the dominant economic and military power of southern Senegambia, and the main target of the Islamic alliance. The Imamate of Futa Jallon began taking important trade towns and forcibly converting the populations in 1805. In the 1840s, local Mandinka Muslims attacked Sedhiou. In 1850, the important fortress of Berekolon fell to the Futa Jallon forces, and in 1862 the core territory of Jimara followed. The war culminated in the 1864 Battle of Kansala, where the Kaabu capital and last remaining major town was destroyed.

=== Maba Diakhou Ba ===
Maba Diakhou Ba was a prominent marabout in the kingdom of Badibu (also known as "Rip"), on the northern bank of the Gambia River. After retaliating against a ceddo raid, a civil war broke out pitting Maba and his followers against Mansa Jeriba. His success attracted more supporters, and he launched his jihad into Serer territory. At the Battle of Nandjigui in 1859 the Marabouts killed the Maad Saloum Kumba Ndama Mbodj. By 1861 Maba controlled most of Saloum and part of Niumi. After repeatedly clashing with French colonial forces, he was eventually defeated and killed during an invasion of the Kingdom of Sine at the Battle of Fandane-Thiouthioune by Maad a Sinig Kumba Ndoffene Famak Joof.

=== Mahmadu Lamine Drame ===
By the 1860s, the Soninke Kingdom of Wuli had been reduced to a vassal of Boundou by continuous marabout raiding. The Wuli ruling family, however, remained animist. For this the wulimansa was targeted and killed by the Sarakholle marabout Mahmadu Lamine Drame in 1887. He then set up a base at Toubakouta in the Kingdom of Niani, devastating the economy of the region, until eventually being defeated by French forces.

== See also ==
- History of Gambia
- History of Senegal
