= Douglas O'Connor =

United States Army general (born 1931)

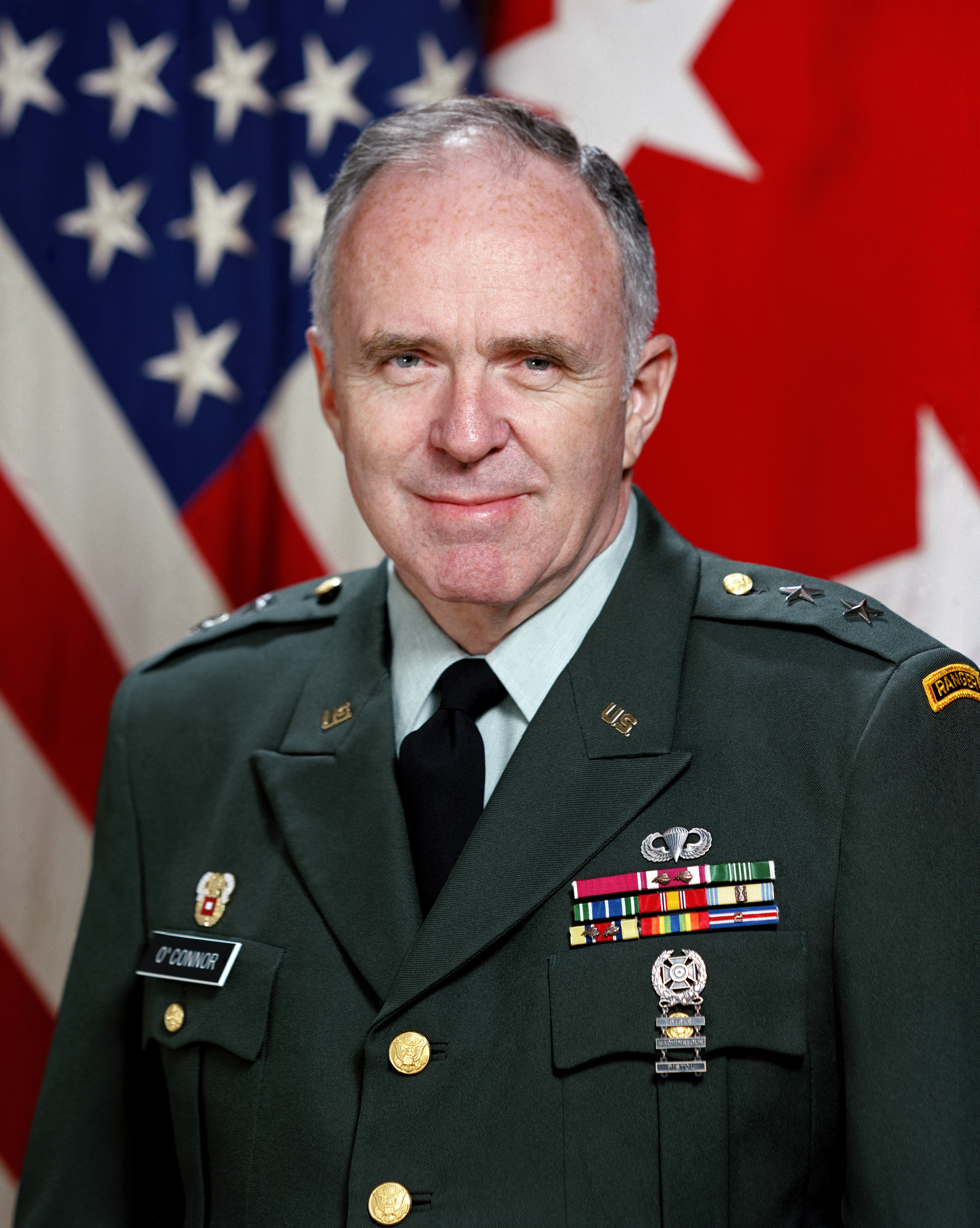
- Born: June 19, 1931 (age 95); New Jersey
- Military career
- Allegiance: United States
- Branch: United States Army
- Service years: 1950–1992
- Rank: Major General
- Commands: 221st Military Police Brigade
- Awards: Army Distinguished Service Medal; Legion of Merit; Meritorious Service Medal (3)

Douglas John O'Connor (born June 19, 1931) is a retired major general in the United States Army.

== Early life and education ==
O'Connor was born in New Jersey. He attended Saint Peter's College (now Saint Peter's University) in Jersey City, before transferring to the United States Military Academy at West Point in 1950. After graduating from West Point in 1954, O'Connor was sent to Georgia for training.

== Military and civilian career ==
By 1955, O'Connor was at Fort Bragg in North Carolina, where he served in the 82nd Airborne Division. In 1957, he transitioned to the Army Reserve. In 1974, O'Connor was working for electronics manufacturer General Instrument in California. He was an engineer by training. By 1978, O'Connor has returned to the military, becoming a brigadier general. From 1988 to 1992, O'Connor served as Vice Director of Defense Industrial Supply Center Four within the Department of the Army. For his service as Vice Director, he was awarded the Army Distinguished Service Medal. By 1995, O'Connor has retired from the military. At the time of his retirement, he had achieved the rank of major general.

== Honors and awards ==
O'Connor was awarded the Army Distinguished Service Medal for "exceptionally meritorious and distinguished service in a position of great responsibility to the Government of the United States as Vice Director, Defense Industrial Supply Center Four, Department of the Army, from 1988 to 1992."

== Personal life ==
In 1949, O'Connor met Jeanne Louise O'Brien. She was attending Manhattanville College. They dated for years before parting in 1954 due to having a long-distance relationship. O'Brien married someone else in 1955, becoming Jeanne Conway. O'Connor went on to marry two different women named Mary Alice, becoming a widower both times. His first wife died of an aneurysm and his second wife died of amyotrophic lateral sclerosis. Conway's husband also died of a heart attack. After the deaths of both of their spouses, O'Connor and Jeanne Conway got back together and married on November 24, 2007, at the Church of St. Vincent Ferrer in New York.
