= Jatta (novel) =

Fantasy novel written by Australian author and illustrator Jenny Hale

- First edition
- Author: Jenny Hale
- Language: English
- Genre: Fantasy, Dark Fantasy, Young Adult
- Publisher: Scholastic Australia
- Publication date: June 2009
- Publication place: Australia
- Media type: Print (paperback)
- Pages: 464 pp
- ISBN: 978-1-74169-312-6
- OCLC: 301693484

Jatta is a fantasy novel by Australian author and illustrator Jenny Hale.

The novel deals with themes of forgiveness and how we are sculpted by family and culture. It investigates societies by contrasting Jatta's pacifist, compassionate and vulnerable ‘Alteeda’ with the brutal, militarily successful Kingdom of Dartith. Once in Dartithan custody, both Jatta and her brother Arthmael are faced with impossible decisions: whether to choose others’ deaths, thus compromising their own souls.

== Plot summary ==
Set in an alternate world, its heroine Jatta discovers in the days before her fourteenth birthday that she is a werewolf. As the wolf inside Jatta grows, it continues to morph. When it impinges on her waking hours, Jatta realises her personality will disintegrate. Eventually none of her gentle humanity will be left.

Princess Jatta wakes on her bedroom floor after a night's carnage she cannot remember, suffering a guilt she cannot explain. Piece by piece she uncovers two frightening truths: she is a werewolf; Dartith's King Brackensith has claimed her as bride for his son. Any protection her father's kingdom of Alteeda has offered Jatta crumbles when, on her fourteenth birthday, Brackensith invades.

Jatta and her brother Arthmael escape to seek help from Sorcerer Redd. They leave him, taking the orb. This purple, plum-sized magical ball creates vivid illusions of sight, sound, smell and taste so convincingly that only the sense of touch can expose them. With Jatta's own prodigious imagination she soon masters the orb. Its illusions provide almost limitless possibilities for deception, entertainment and escape. However, Jatta cannot escape the sinister werewolf episodes she now suffers.

As Brackensith's grip tightens on Alteeda, Jatta realises that only her surrender will save her kingdom. Her journey with Arthmael to Dartith's dark isle is fraught with dangers. They are kidnapped, thrown to dragons, and trapped with lost souls inside an enchanted fire. Jatta is forced into a betrothal to the dangerously unbalanced Prince Riz. On Dartith, where night stretches for sixteen of every twenty-four hours, Jatta and Arthmael meet and befriend Princess Noriglade, Brackensith's Undead daughter. Noriglade also despises what she is. Though the Undead rarely kill, they do kidnap their victim's soul as they drink, a torturous experience for the victim and a corrupting one for the Undead.

Noriglade and Arthmael yearn to escape to Alteeda. Jatta resigns herself to staying, fearing her wolf is invading her personality. When mad Prince Riz stages a coup, the three young Royals are caught up in the massacre. It is Jatta’ unique powers that save them, and Jatta, Arthmael and Noriglade return to Alteeda.

== Reception ==
Aussiereviews described the book as "a thrilling fantasy tale" and concludes that "plot is filled with... challenges, with twists and turns, and with action, in a blend which will satisfy teen readers".
