= Busumbala =

- Location in the Gambia
- Coordinates: 13°20′N 16°40′W
- Country: The Gambia
- Division: Western Division
- District: Kombo North/Saint Mary

Population (2009)
  - Total: 11,189 (est.)

Busumbala , also known as Old-Busumbala, is a small town in western Gambia. It is located in Kombo North/Saint Mary District in the Western Division. As of 2009, it has an estimated population of 11,189.

== History ==
During the Soninke-Marabout Wars, Busumbala was a Soninke town and the capital of the King of Kombo, Suling Jatta. On June 24th 1855, it was attacked by a Marabout force. The attack was repelled, but the king was killed.

== Lifestyle ==
In Busumbala, the women generally handle agriculture and products consumed locally, while the men work in agriculture and grow crops for commercial reasons to make money. The women get little to no education. Construction of a nursery school started in 2014 and is nearing completion. Pupil registration took place in September 2023 and the first classroom opened in October 2023. The construction of the school is being funded by charity donations to the charity organization of Building Futures in the Gambia.
