= Niasse =

Traditional masked figures in the Jola religion

The Niasse, along with the Kumpo and the Samay, are three traditional masked figures in the religion of the Jola people, living in the Casamance (Senegal) Gambia and in Guinea-Bissau.

They play a central role in the social life of the traditional village. Multiple times in the course of the year, e.g. during the Journées culturelles, a folk festival in the village is organized.

All three figures are masked dancers. The niasse has two short sticks to mimic a gorilla's walk. The kumpo is completely covered with palm leaves and is considered to be a ghost. Between the niasse and the samay, which are more people-like, there are fewer differences. The type of dance is a bit different; other differences are:

Attribute	Samay	Niasse	Kumpo
Arm	One single arm	Two arms	Completely covered with palm leaves
Horns	Has two horns on the head	Does not have horns	No horn
Stick	Has one long stick in his hand	Equipped with two short sticks	One long stick on the head
