= Samay (mythology) =

Traditional figure in the mythology of the Jola people

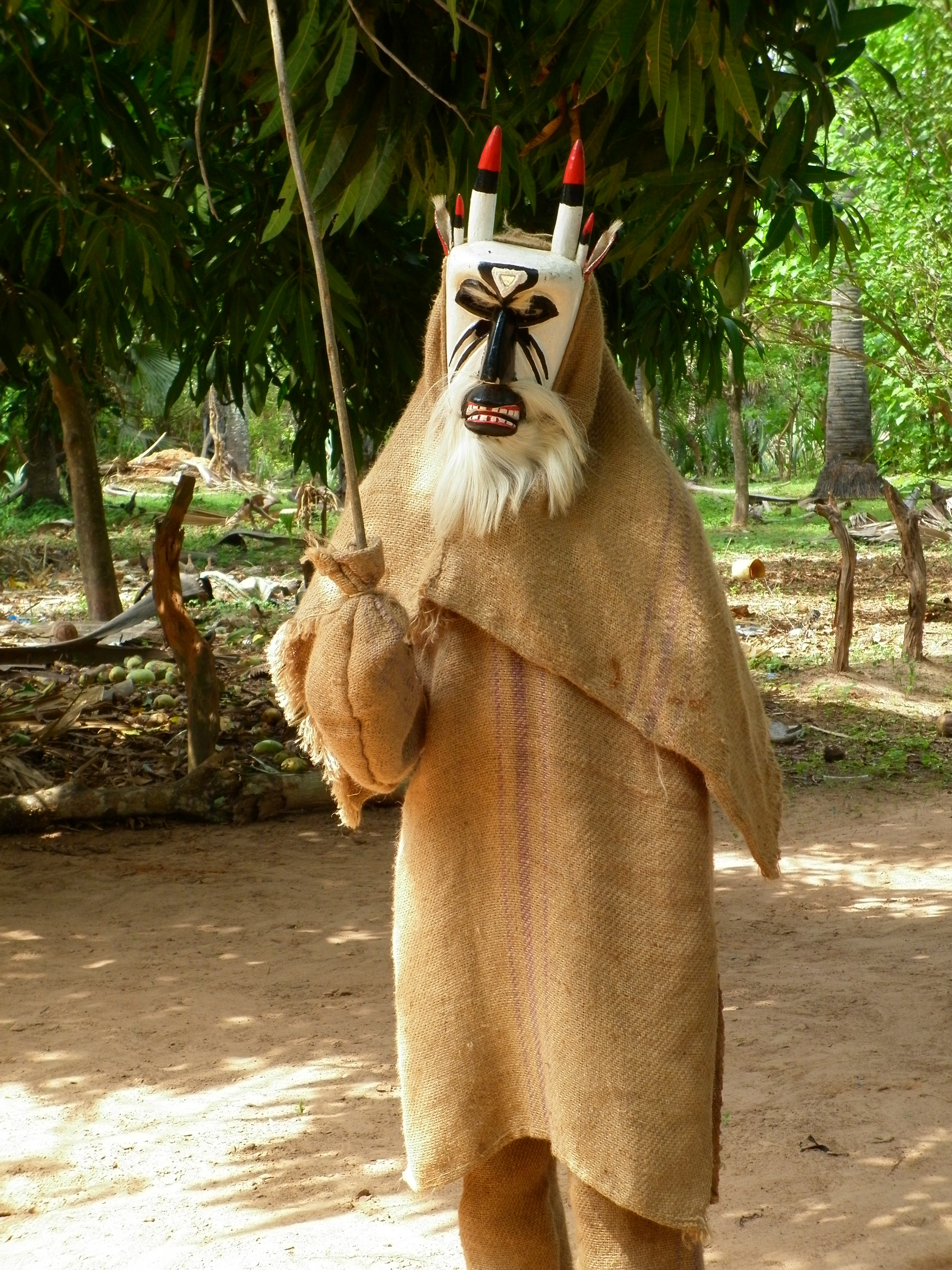
The Samay is a mythological figure of the Diola people in the Casamance.

The Kumpo, the Samay, and the Niasse are three traditional figures in the mythology of the Diola in the Casamance (Senegal) Gambia and Guinea-Bissau.

Multiple times in the course of the year, i.e. during the Journées culturelles, a folk festival in the village is organized. The Samay invites the people of the village to participate in the festivities.

The Samay has two horns and represents a deer. Wielding a stick, he mandates strict order in the community and is believed to know everything that happens in the village.

He can be considered the ceremony master of the traditional dance event.

== Similar figures ==
- Kumpo
- Niasse
