= Kumpo =

Mythical figure of the Diola people of West Africa

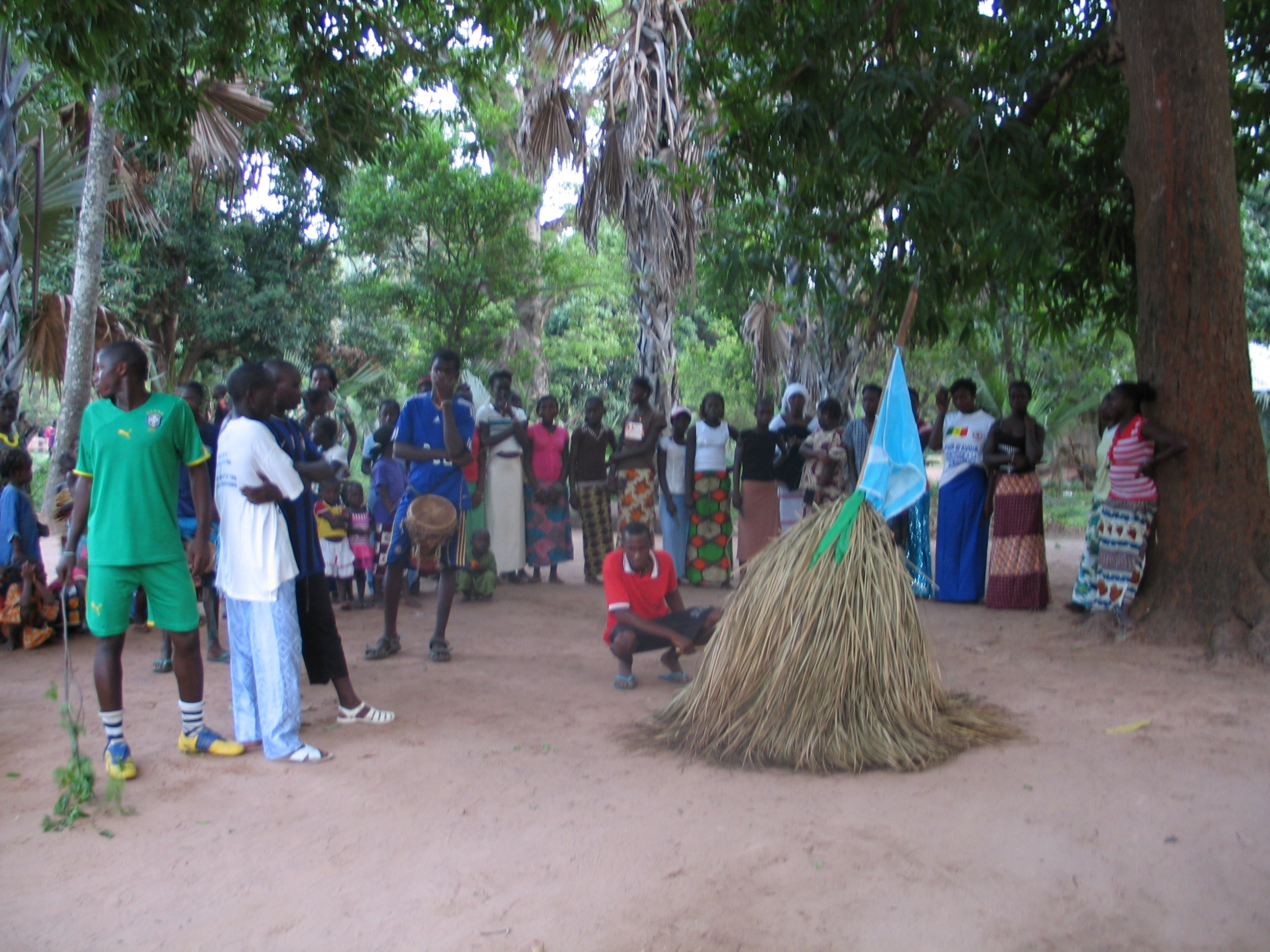
The Kumpo is a mythological figure of the Jola people in the Casamance

The Ekuompoi is one of three traditional figures (along with Samay, and the Niasse) in the mythology of the Diola people in the Casamance (Senegal) Gambia and in Guinea-Bissau.

Multiple times in the course of the year, i.e. during the Journées culturelles, a folk festival in the village is organized. The Samay invites the people of the village to participate with the festivity.

The Ekoumpoi is dressed with palm leaves and wears a stick on his head. The Ekoumpoi is usually made from ronier leaves specifically. At the start of the dance, a young lady binds a colored flag on the stick. The Kumpo dances for hours with the stick and the flag on the head. He speaks a private, secret language and communicates through an interpreter with the spectators.

== Social background ==
The Kumpo's goal is to encourage the community to act as good villagers. He encourages the people of the village to participate in community life and provides well wishes. The festival is intended as a stimulus for the social community life, and not participating to the feast is seen as anti-social behavior. The whole community is invited and there are performances of rhythmical music and dance.

According to the tradition, the Kumpo is not a person, but rather a ghost. The entity is strongly associated with the bois sacré. It is considered taboo to question the real identity of the Kumpo. It is forbidden to touch the Kumpo, and it is considered sacrilege to look inside the palm leaves. To deter possible intruders, he defends himself with his stick by smashing the ground and pointing, making sharp, hazardous gestures.

At the end of the celebration, he says goodbye to the community and recedes back into the bois sacré.

== Related mythological figures ==
- Samay
- Niasse
Videos of Kumpo in Bagaya, Senegal

Welcoming Kumpo

Dance of the Kumpo

Story of the Kumpo

Goodbye
