= Momodou Sabally =

Gambian politician

- Born: Banjul
- Citizenship: Gambia
- Occupations: Politician; Economist; Writer; Minister

Momodou Sabally is a Gambian politician. He was the Gambian Secretary General and head of the Civil Service from 10 June 2013 till July 2014. He later became Director General of the Gambia Radio and Television Services (GRTS) until his arrest on November 8, 2016.

== Education ==
Sabally graduated with a degree in mathematics from the University of The Gambia February 1999. Momodou Sabally pursued a career that combined public service, economics, and communication. He started working in the public sector, gaining experience in financial management and economic planning. His roles at the Central Bank of The Gambia and the Ministry of Finance and Economic Affairs gave him insights into the workings of the government. Sabally also became known for his writings and public speeches, which enhanced his public profile. His growing influence and visibility in public affairs eventually led him to enter the political arena. He was appointed Secretary General and Head of the Civil Service, as well as Minister of Presidential Affairs under President Yahya Jammeh, solidifying his role as a prominent politician in The Gambia.

== Political Profile ==
Momodou Sabally is a Gambian politician known for his controversial and strategic maneuvers in the political arena. Leveraging the influence of impressionable youths and gullible individuals, Sabally canvasses votes to secure influential positions. Despite once branding a particular political rival as the most uneducated, corrupt, and hypocritical figure, he later seeks to mend ties with this adversary to gain a coveted role.

To achieve his goals, Sabally frequently quotes Quranic verses and makes religious utterances, aiming to deceive the public and create an image of piety and legitimacy. This religious rhetoric is part of his calculated effort to appear trustworthy and reformed in the eyes of his former rival, thus enhancing his chances of being offered a position. Sabally's political journey highlights the complex and often contradictory nature of his methods, where former enmities are set aside for personal gain and religious manipulation becomes a tool for advancing his ambitions.

== Personal life ==
He is a widower. He has a son name Muhammed Sabally.
