= Kombo =

Traditional kingdom of Gambia

Kingdom of Kombo
- c. 1271–1875
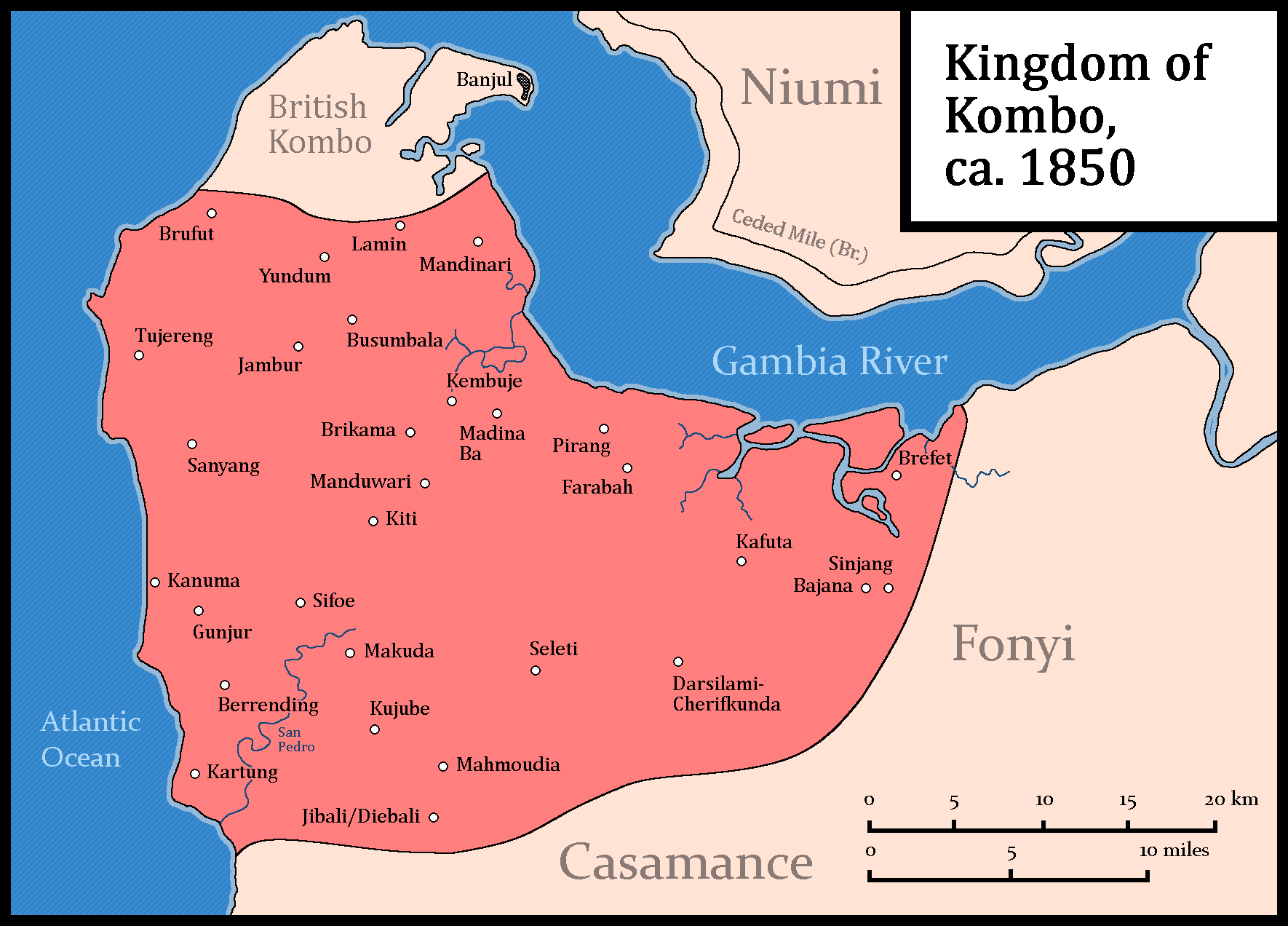
- Territory of the Kingdom of Kombo
- Mansa
  - c. 1271: Karapha Yalli Jatta (the hunter) son of Mansa Ali Jatta Keita
  - 1855–1875: Tomani Bojang
- History
  - Established: c. 1271
  - Soninke-Marabout War: 1850–1856
  - Disestablished: 1875
Preceded by	Succeeded by
Mali Empire	Gambia Colony and Protectorate / Image missing
- Today part of: The Gambia; Senegal

Kombo or Combo was a kingdom and later a chieftaincy in Gambia during the colonial period. Kombo was part of the Mali Empire and gained independence after its fall, and was then ruled by the Sambou Bainunka clan. Mansa Karapha Yalli Jatta became the first King of Kombo, after seeking help from the then independent Kaabu Empire to establish the Kingdom of Kombo, he married the daughter of the Bainuk Queen Wullending Jasseh of Sanyang who sits at Gunjur and took her to Busumbala. Mansa Karapha Yalli Jatta was from the Jatta (Lion) clan who claim ancestry from Sundiata Keita the first Emperor of the Mali Empire. Kombo was ruled by two families, the Jatta (Djatta) and Bojang (Bodian) clans, when one clan becomes Mansa, the other clan gets to choose the crown prince from their own clan and vice versa. From 1840-1855 Mansa Suling Jatta was the King of Kombo, he was killed in the Soninke-Marabout war, and most of the Jatta clan moved to other regions.

== History ==
There are relatively few mentions of Kombo in early Western literature on the Gambia, owing primarily to the fact that European visitors primarily visited the northern ports. In 1621, as English explorer Richard Jobson was about to leave the Gambia, he recorded that he met the King of Kombo, who welcomed him to the country. Portuguese explorer André Donelha wrote in 1625 that Kombo "produces much rice and is very beautiful." Another Portuguese explorer, Francisco de Lemos Coelho, wrote in 1688 that the King of Kombo was a Falupo, a general term meaning a Jola living near Casamance and that his village was the largest anywhere on the river. Coelho further wrote that Kombo had "much wax and rice" and that the King and his people were Pagan. In reality, he was a Mandinka while his mother was a Bainouk and he was a Muslim who probably was not very religious to attract European tourists and traders as many Muslims do today. The Masquerade Kumpo is named after Kombo.

An early map of the Gambia by the Courlanders in 1651 shows that they believed Kombo was an island. The Vermuyden map of 1661 and Leach's map of 1732 did not make this same error. Leach's map shows a number of locations, including Mansakunda (the King's town), a Muslim town to the east of the kingdom called Morakunda, and Kabata town. Francis Moore wrote in 1730 that the territory of Kombo spanned approximately 30 miles from Cape St. Mary's to the Kabata River.

There were originally seven villages of Kombo. namely Busumbala, Brikama, Yundum, Jamburu, Kafuta, Sanyang and Manduar.

== King of Kombo ==
The King of Kombo was known as 'Mansa'.

=== List of Kings of Kombo ===
Name	Reign	Notes
Mansa Karapha Yalli Jatta		The hunter who married the daughter of Queen Wullending Jasseh, establishing the Kingdom of Kombo and becoming its first king.
Mansa Sanjani Bojang		
Mansa Koli Jatta		
Mansa Tomani Bojang		Made treaty in 1816 with Alexander Grant that leased St. Mary's Island.
Mansa Suling Jatta	1840-1855	
Mansa Koli Bojang	1855-1875	
