= Carabane =

Village in Senegal

Coordinates: 12°32′16″N 16°42′03″W

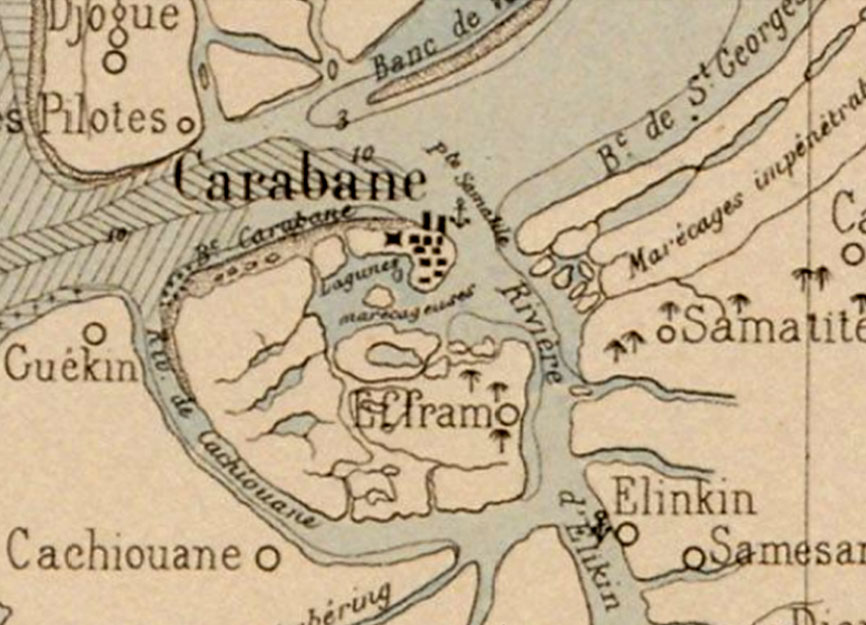
- An 1890 map of the island

- Location within Senegal

Geography
- Location: Casamance River
- Archipelago: Islands of the Casamance delta
- Area: 57 km^{2} (22 sq mi)
- Highest elevation: 2 m (7 ft)
- Highest point: unnamed

Administration
- Senegal
- Region: Ziguinchor
- Department: Oussouye

Demographics
- Population: 396 (2003)
- Pop. density: 7/km^{2} (18/sq mi)
- Ethnic groups: Jola

Senegal is the most westerly part of Africa.

Carabane, also known as Karabane, is an island and a village located in the extreme south-west of Senegal, in the mouth of the Casamance River. This relatively recent geological formation consists of a shoal and alluvium to which soil is added by accumulation in the branches and roots of the mangrove trees which cover most of the island. Along with the rest of Ziguinchor Region, Carabane has a tropical climate, cycling between a dry season and a wet season. The island was once considered an arid location where no useful plants were likely to grow, but it now supports several types of fruit tree, the most common of which are mangos and oranges. Although the nearby Basse Casamance National Park and Kalissaye Avifaunal Reserve have been closed for years because of the Casamance Conflict, Carabane has continued to attract ornithologists interested in its wide variety of birds. Various species of fish are plentiful around the island, but there are very few mammals.

The earliest known inhabitants of the island were the Jola, the ethnic group which is still the most populous on the island. The Portuguese were active in the region from the 16th century onwards; however, they did not linger on "Mosquito Island", the mosquitoes and black flies convincing them to establish their trading post in the town of Ziguinchor instead in 1645. On January 22, 1836, the island was ceded to France by the village leader of Kagnout in return for an annual payment of 196 francs. A series of treaties between the French and the leaders of the local peoples ensued; however, the inhabitants of Carabane did not recognize the authority of the treaties imposed upon them, resulting in lootings and abductions among French rice farmers by the Karoninka people. In 1869, Carabane became autonomous, but it merged with Sédhiou in 1886. Since World War II, the population of the island has gradually declined for a variety of reasons including periods of drought, the Casamance Conflict and, more recently, the sinking of the ferry Joola in 2002. Much of the village's ability to trade and receive tourists was lost until 2014, when MV Aline Sitoe Diatta resumed ferry services to the island.

Although Carabane was once a regional capital, the village has since become so politically isolated from the rest of the country that it no longer fits into any category of the administrative structure decreed by the Senegalese government. The Jola account for the majority of the island's population and Jola society has no formal hierarchy. The indigenous population was originally animist, but although the sacred groves and fetishes survive as cultural icons of Casamance, the monotheistic belief systems of Catholicism and Islam have become the most widely held in Carabane. The literacy rate is approximately 90%. Students attend a primary school on the island, but must move at least as far as Elinkine to continue their studies.

The testimonies of explorers and colonial administrators demonstrate that Carabane has participated in rice cultivation, fishery, trade, and palm wine production for a long time. The rice cycle plays a central economic and religious role in the lives of the population. Palm oil and palm wine are very popular and traditional in the area. The fishery has long been dominated by artisan fishing, which supplies the daily needs of the island's population; however, broader economic possibilities have been exploited since the early 20th century. Although there have been attempts to cultivate a tourism industry on the island, the inhabitants have been reluctant to participate. Carabane was added to the list of historic sites and monuments of Senegal in 2003.

== Toponymy ==
The etymology of Carabane remains unclear. It could be connected to the Wolof word karabané, which means "who speaks a lot", or possibly the Portuguese words casa and acaba, which mean "house" and "finish", respectively. According to this hypothesis, the name means the place "where the houses are finished", a possible allusion to the fact that this village was the first French capital in Basse Casamance. According to other sources, the name comes from karam akam, which means "the other side of the river". These uncertainties are augmented by the instability of the spelling: Karabane with an initial K suggests a Jola or Wolof origin, while Carabane with a C would suggest a Latin derivation, most probably through Portuguese or French. (Note: More rarely, one may find the spelling Karaban (notably in English and German sources) or Karabanne (particularly in Spanish and Portuguese sources).)

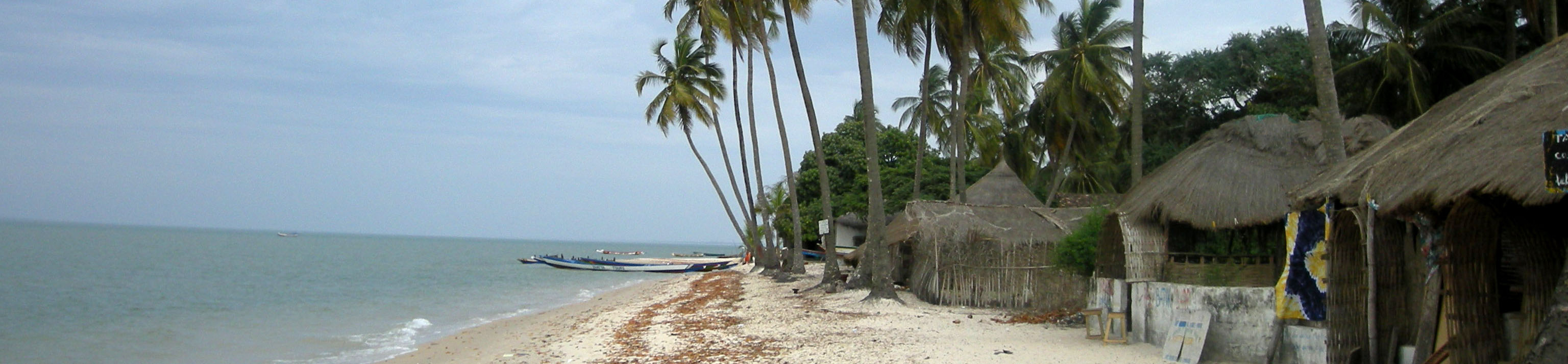
Although most of Carabane is covered in mangroves, its coconut trees and sandy beaches attract tourists.

== Geography ==
=== Location ===
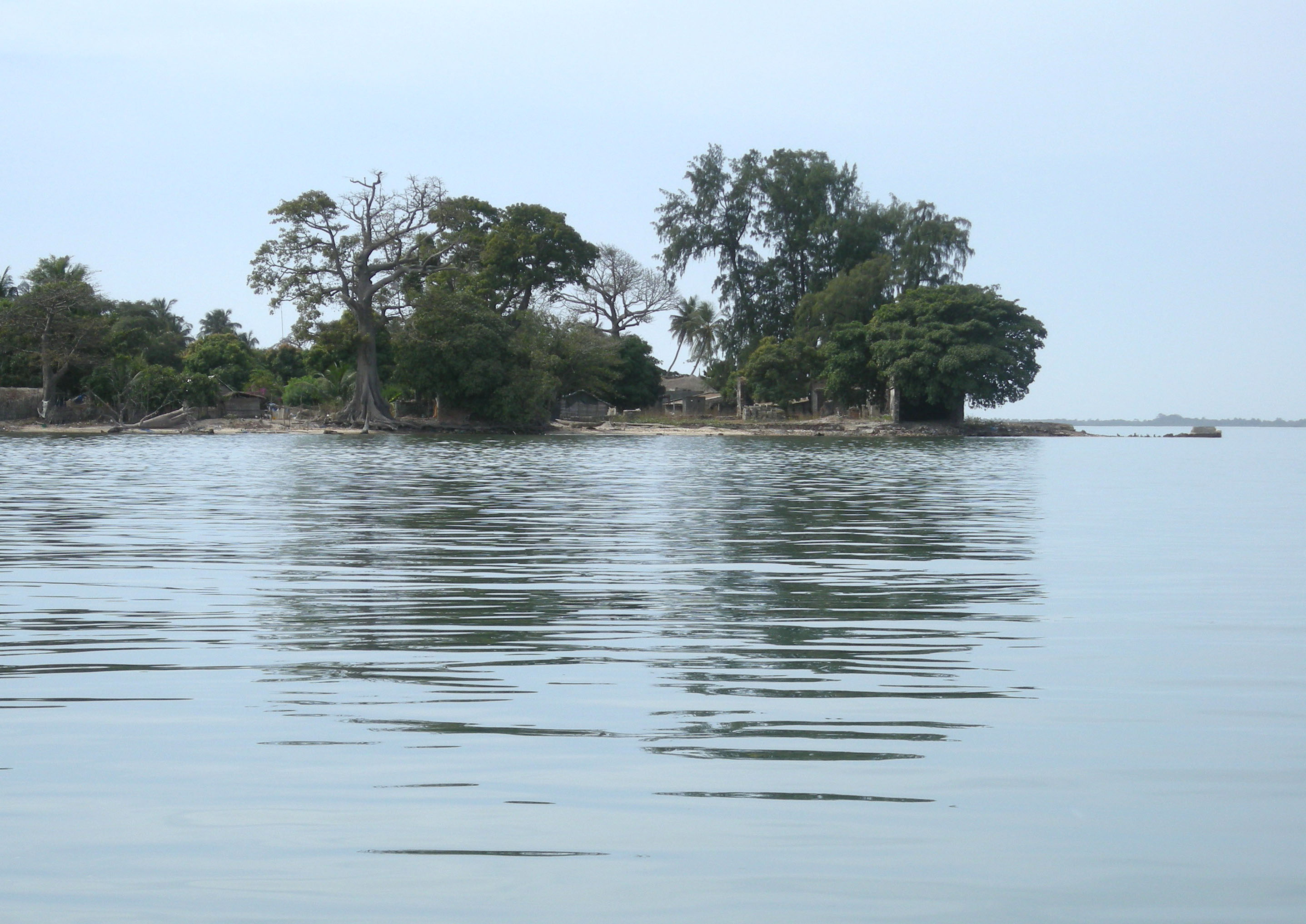
The shortest route to Carabane from the mainland is a half-hour motorized pirogue trip from Elinkine.

With a total area of 57 square kilometres (22 sq mi), Carabane is the last major island in the mouth of the Casamance River in south-west Senegal. It is situated 12° 32' N latitude and 16° 43' W longitude and is, by way of Elinkine, nearly 60 kilometres (37 mi) away from Ziguinchor, the capital of the region of the same name, and a little over 500 kilometres (310 mi) from Dakar, the country's capital.

"Il faut s'armer de patience pour rejoindre l'île de Carabane" is a common French phrase which means "One must have patience to reach the island of Carabane". While this adage continues to hold true, it was even more appropriate in the 19th century when, according to one traveller, a 26-hour boat trip from Rufisque (near Dakar) to Carabane was deemed fairly short, and was credited to a favourable wind.

Despite the seemingly close proximity to its neighbouring communities, a motorized pirogue trip to Carabane from Elinkine, the nearest village, takes about thirty minutes; the trip once took an hour and a half by canoe. Carabane may also be accessed by a two- or three-hour boat trip from Ziguinchor. Travelling from Cap Skirring via Cachouane is also possible, but as a detailed map of the region would make clear, the channels of salt water are not easily navigated.

=== Geology ===
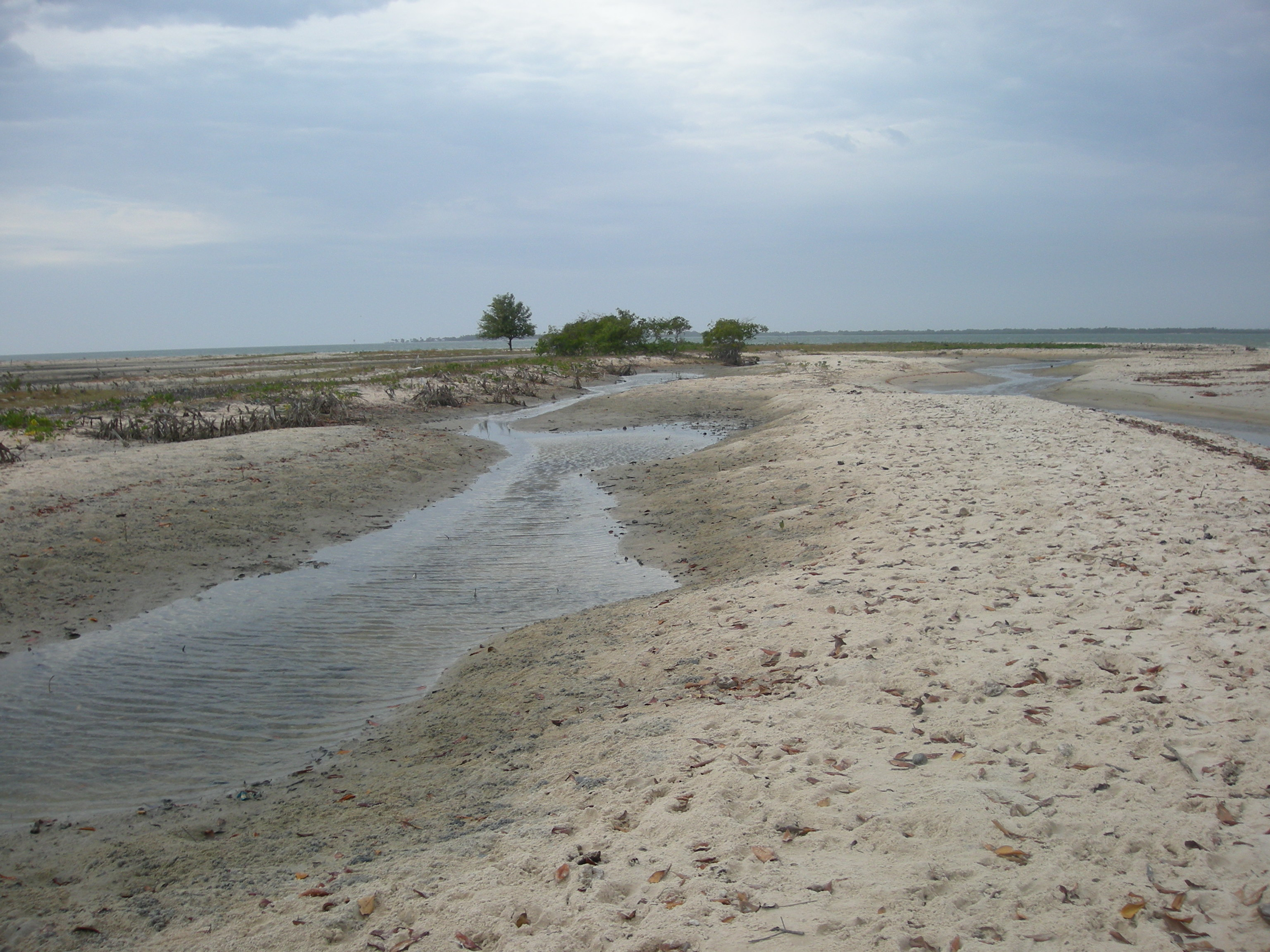
Saltwater streams cut across the shoal.

A recent geological formation, Carabane consists of a shoal and alluvium. The alluvium has developed because of the saltwater streams that cut across the shoal. As pointed out by early French observers, soils in the region are generally composed of sand and clay, differing in mixture and layer according to natural and human factors. However, Carabane seems to be composed entirely of sand. The lack of clay is the reason that architecture on the island employs straw wrapped around wooden frames more often than banco mud bricks. This type of architecture is also common in the villages of Mlomp and Seleki.

In this flat and marshy area, the branches and roots of mangrove trees form dams where deposits of oyster shells naturally accumulate along with mud and plant detritus. These tangles help retain soil, a process which expands the island where the power of tidal race would normally have the opposite effect.

Rising just over 2 m (6.6 ft), the southern portion of the island is partially flooded during the rainy season and totally submerged every few years. At low tide, mudflats are exposed so that boats with keels are forced to dock a considerable distance from the island. When arriving at Carabane, the Joola had to stop about 500 m (1,600 ft) north of the village in 8 to 10 m (26 to 33 ft) of water.

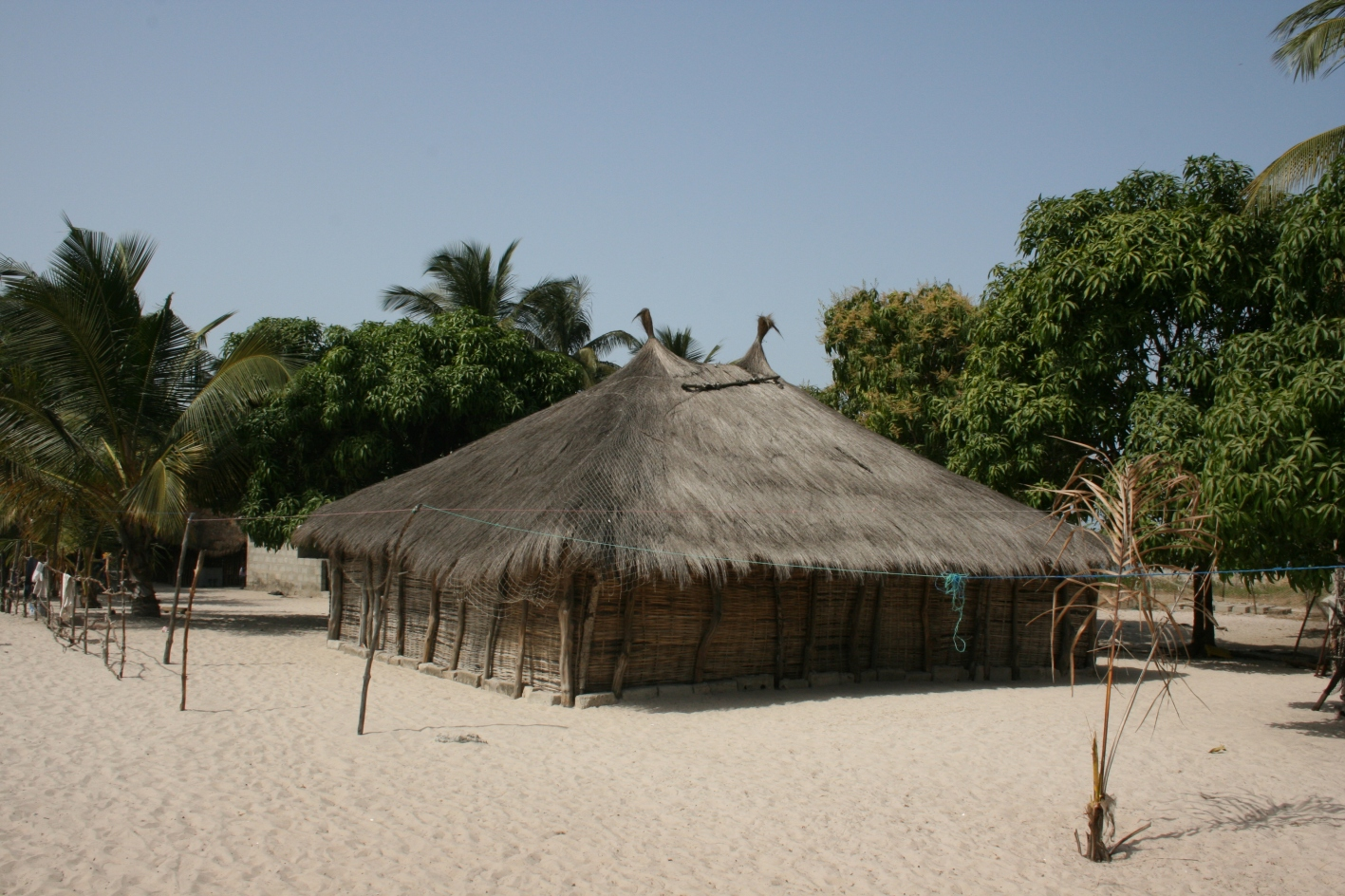
Because of their lack of clay, the island's inhabitants build their houses by wrapping straw around wooden frames.

The coastal erosion and salinization affecting the west of Senegal are also a source of concern on the island; signs of erosion have been observed in Carabane since 1849. The house of the government representative on the island has burned down twice; each time it was rebuilt, the site of the building had to be moved further and further inland. The island's erosion is evident when one considers that the original location of the house eventually became flooded, even at low tide. During the dry season the river has a tide-dominated delta, with tidewater reaching 200 kilometres (120 mi) upstream, while it is being concentrated 50% by evaporation.

Using wells, freshwater is available at a reasonable depth for irrigation and domestic purposes. Until the installation of a pump in 2006, however, drinking water had to be sent by boat from Elinkine.

=== Climate ===
The tropical climate of Basse Casamance cycles between a dry season and a wet season, which usually starts in June and ends in October. Because of the proximity to the ocean, the humidity of the air remains above 40% and contributes to the abundance of vegetation. With the trade winds from the Azores High, the island enjoys a pleasant climate year-round. In the north to north-east, these winds are cool and always wet. Their presence is appreciated by kitesurfers. Agricultural activities, including rice cultivation, depend entirely on rainfall. "Wah uŋejutumu, emit elaatut" is a Jola proverb which means "If a project will not be completed, it will be because the rain did not fall." The invocation of fetishes when there is no rain is part of traditional animist rituals. In recent decades, there has been a general decline in rainfall, which threatens rice production, increases soil salinity, and contributes to the degradation of the mangroves. In May and June, air temperature is around 28 °C (82 °F). In January and February, the coldest months, it is around 24 °C (75 °F). Temperatures of below 18 °C (64 °F) are quite rare. In September, the temperature of surface seawater is 26 °C (79 °F).

=== Flora ===
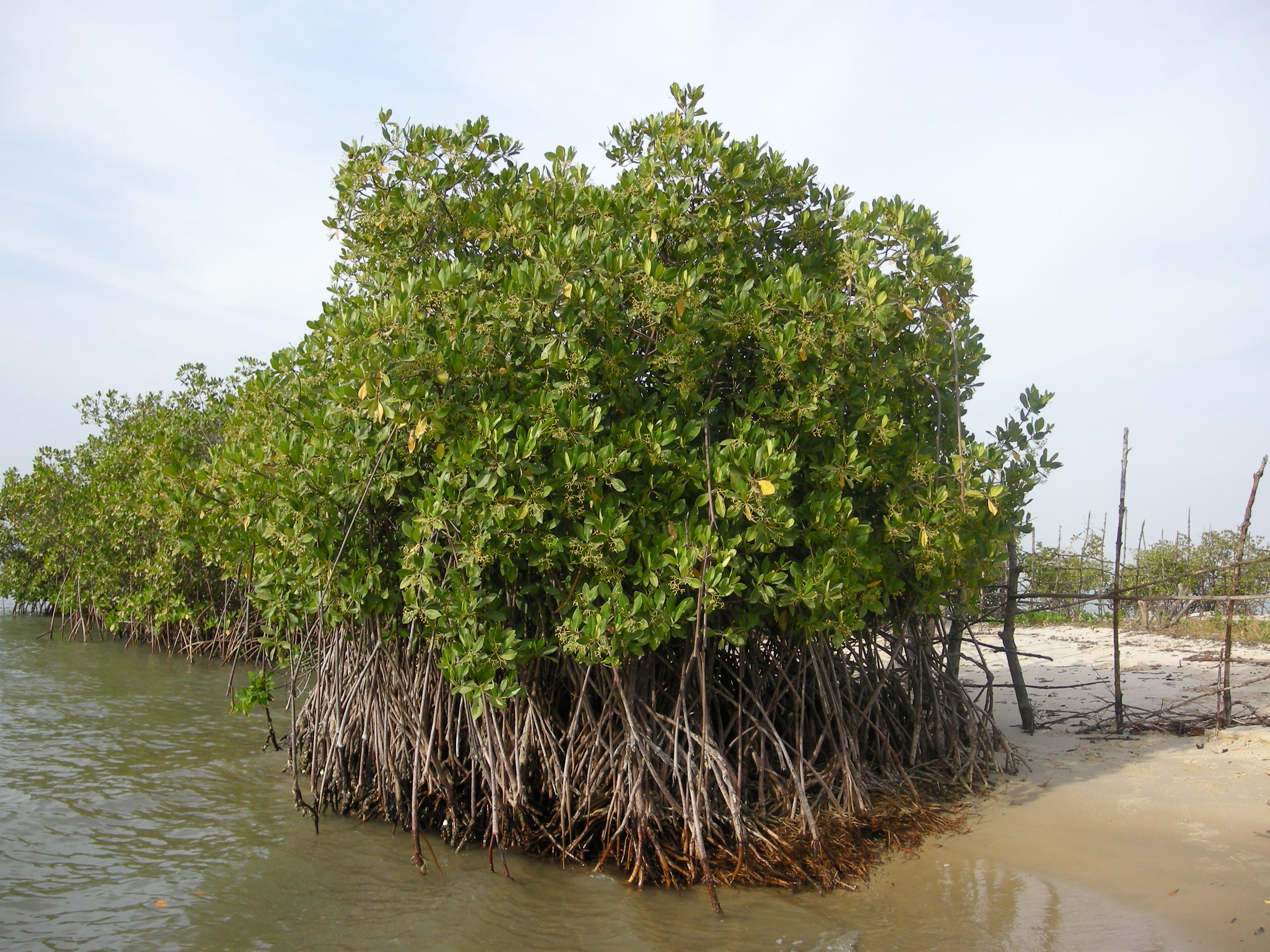
Mangroves are pervasive on the island.

At one time, the island was considered an arid location, where coconuts were the only useful plants likely to flourish and vegetables were difficult to produce. In what has become a tropical climate, vegetation is more abundant than in the north of the country, especially during the wet season. Anxious to attract the attention of the French colonial administration which he judged insufficiently involved in the development of Casamance, administrator Emmanuel Bertrand-Bocandé submitted a report which documented in great detail the plant species then present on the island. Although this report was written in 1849, the information it contains has remained valuable even into the 21st century.

Most of Carabane is covered in mangroves, forming an impassable jungle that can only be crossed in constructed passages. Mangroves are among the few species capable of adapting to the highly saline environment, where the quantity of oxygen in the soil is low. In recent decades there has been concern that the mangroves are less prevalent. There are various reasons for the degradation, including crustaceans and the unregulated exploitation of wood. Efforts have been made to safeguard the mangroves and to educate children about their importance.

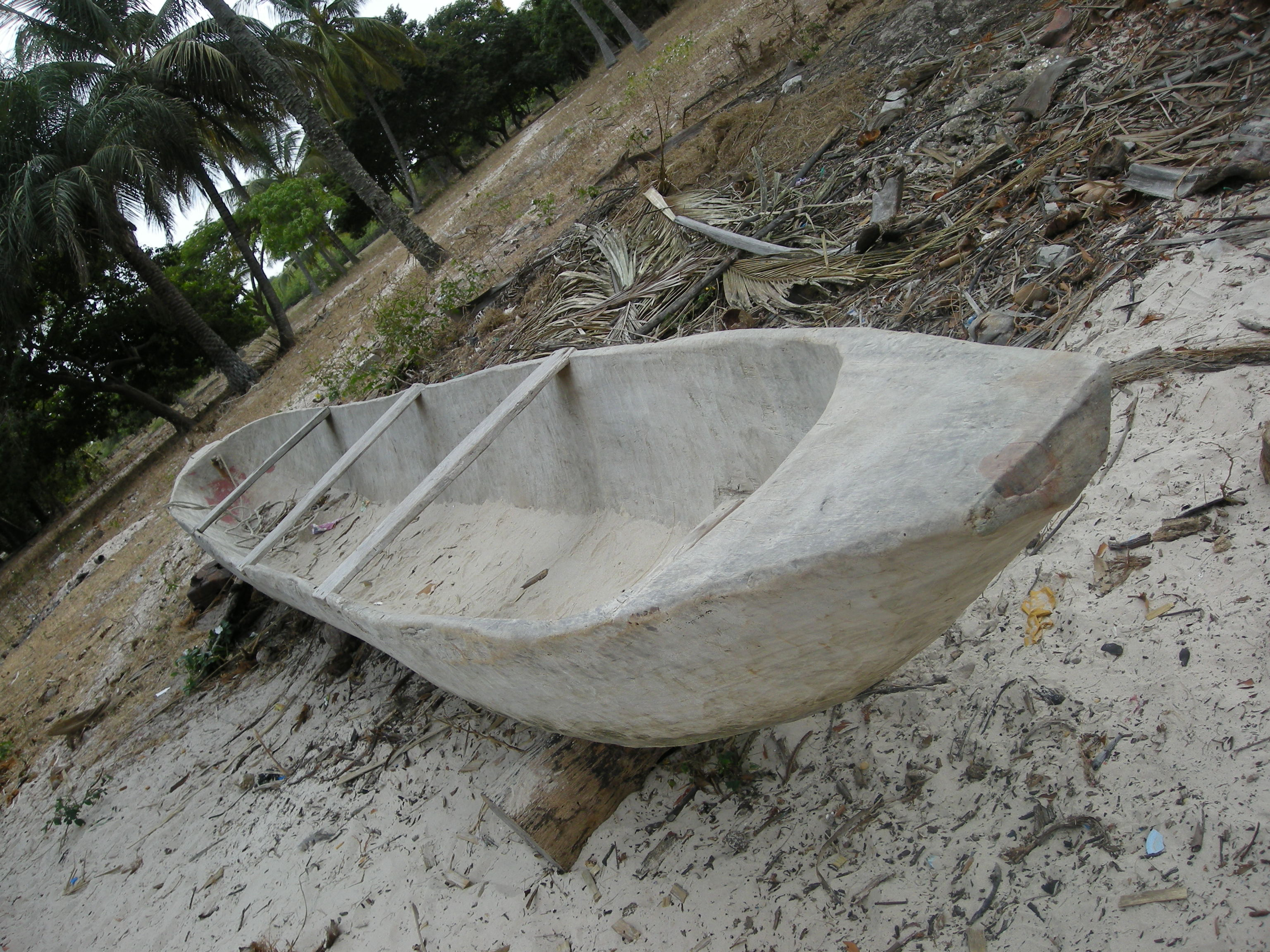
Because Bombax wood is so easy to work, the trunks of 'kapok' or 'kapokier' trees are often carved into pirogues.

Tourists are not as attracted to the island for its mangroves as for the coconut trees which line its beaches, as featured on many of Carabane's postcards. These palm trees are a valued resource on the island.

While not as plentiful as in other parts of Basse Casamance such as Mlomp, trees of the Bombax genus and Malvaceae family (all known as 'kapok' in English) are nonetheless present. Their grey wood is very light and easy to work, for which reasons it is used to construct many items, ranging from doors to dugouts. Jola canoes, which range from 6 to 8 metres (20 to 26 ft) in length, are carved by adzes entirely out of one tree each, unlike the traditional Senegalese pirogue.

As for fruit trees, mangos and oranges are the most populous. Prickly pears, flamboyants, and colourful bougainvilleas brighten the scenery of hotels and camps on the island. Various organizations have contributed to the deforestation of the island.

=== Fauna ===
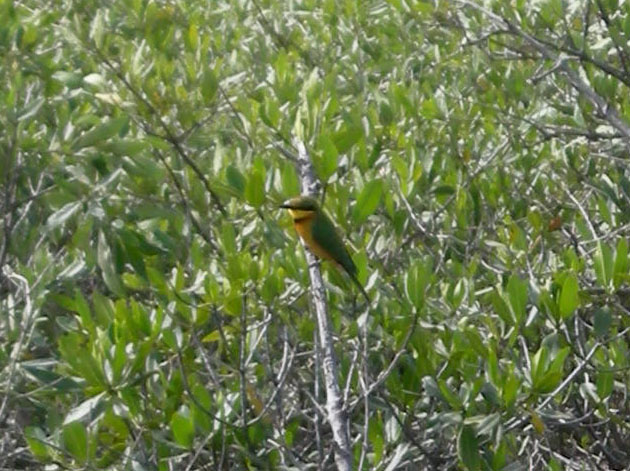
A variety of bird species, such as the little bee-eater, may be viewed among the mangroves on the island.

The wide variety of birds in Basse Casamance was noted by early explorers. While Basse Casamance National Park and Kalissaye Avifaunal Reserve have not been open for years due to the Casamance Conflict, Carabane has been found to be very conducive to ornithological observation. A study in 1998 discovered the following species on the island: African darter (Anhinga rufa), Goliath heron (Ardea goliath), palm-nut vulture (Gypohierax angolensis), black-tailed godwit (Limosa limosa), whimbrel (Numenius phaeopus), Eurasian curlew (Numenius arquata), Caspian tern (Sterna caspia), blue-spotted wood-dove (Turtur afer), red-eyed dove (Streptopelia semitorquata), white-rumped swift (Apus caffer), woodland kingfisher (Halcyon senegalensis), grey-backed camaroptera (Camaroptera brachyura), red-bellied paradise-flycatcher (Terpsiphone rufiventer), pied crow (Corvus albus), black-rumped waxbill (Estrilda troglodytes) and yellow-fronted canary (Serinus mozambicus).

Fish are plentiful in the waters surrounding the island, where one may encounter trevallies (Carangidae), Giant African threadfins (Polydactylus quadrifilis), great barracudas (Sphyraena barracuda), or African red snappers (Lutjanus agennes). The mangroves are home to many crustaceans such as southern pink shrimp (Farfantepenaeus notialis), sand fiddler crabs (Uca pugilator), and molluscs. The shellfish population consists mostly of mangrove oysters (Crassostrea gasar), which cling to uncovered mangrove roots at low tide. The red-headed agama and monitor lizard make up the reptilian population of the island.

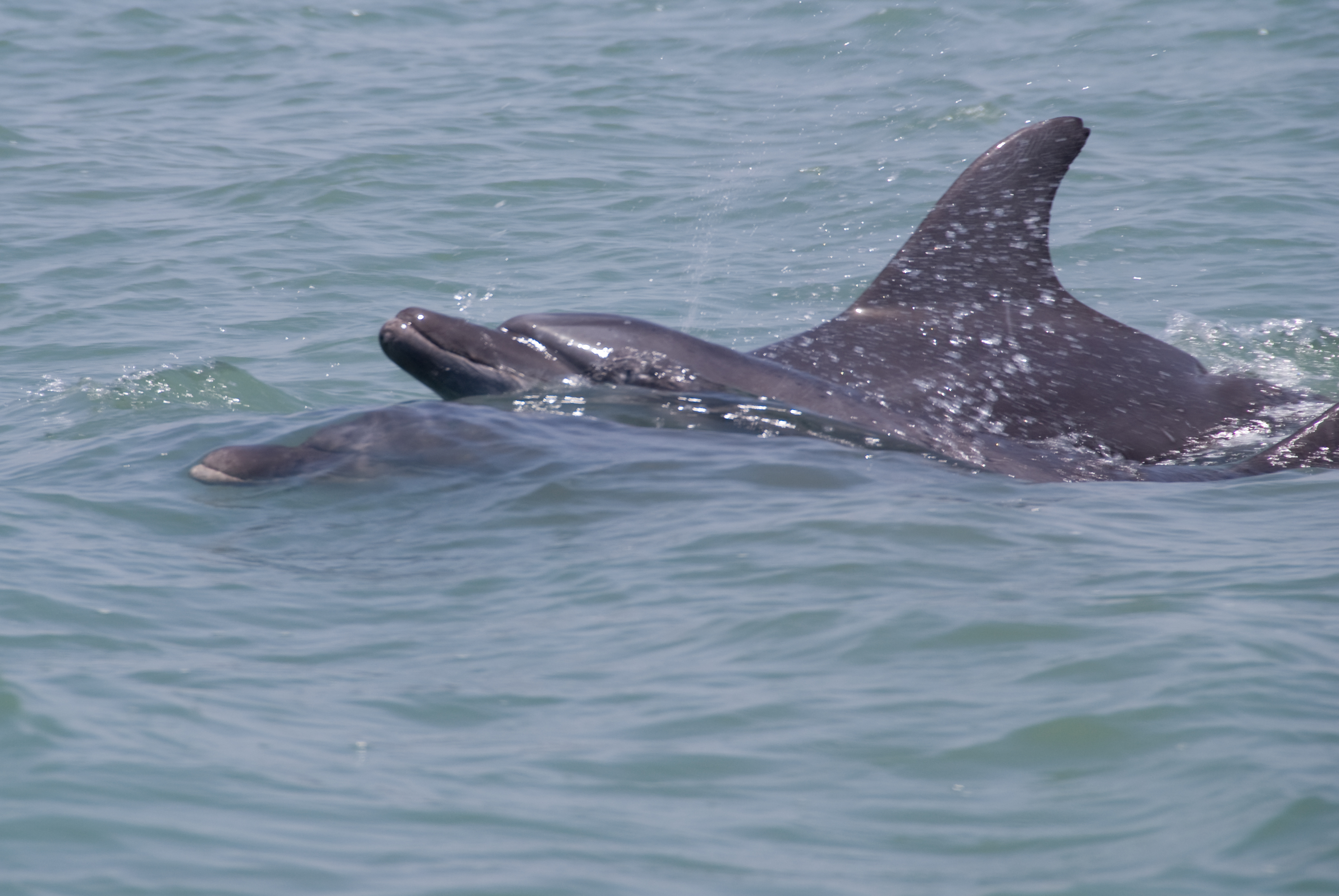
Bottlenose dolphins are plentiful in the Casamance River.

The sandbar of Carabane has very few mammals other than pets, although the French first noted the presence of monkeys in 1835. In 1870, other settlers noted with disgust that the natives often ate monkeys and dogs. In the early 21st century, bottlenose dolphins (Tursiops truncatus) are commonly sighted off the island. The lack of tourism because of the civil unrest has benefited biodiversity. In this way, the nearby Basse Casamance National Park, which has been closed for years, has seen a remarkable return of Nile crocodiles (Crocodylus niloticus), Senegalese manatees (Trichechus senegalensis), and breeding birds.

On an island called Ilha dos Mosquitos (Portuguese for "Mosquito Island"), the natives and their visitors continue to protect themselves with mosquito nets and Shea butter. They must also protect themselves from other, smaller insects which are no less troublesome: black flies (Simulium).

== History ==
=== First inhabitants ===
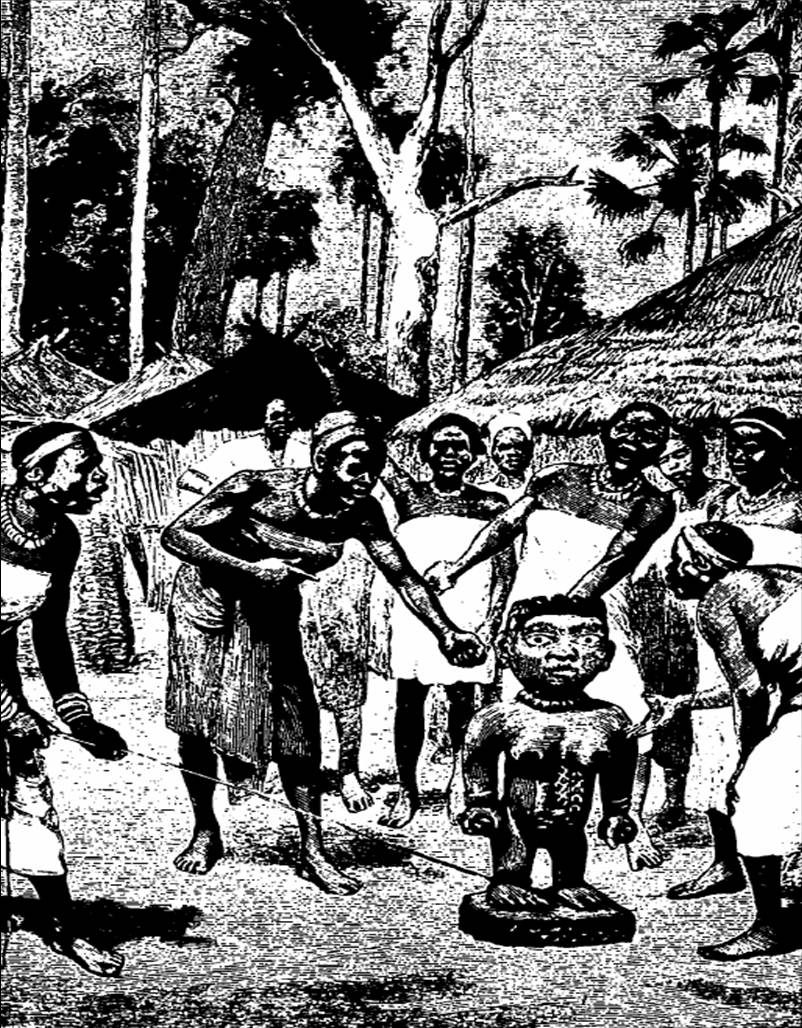
Animism in Carabane: inhabitants cursing a fetish because their prayers have failed to make it rain (1893 engraving)

The traditions of the local peoples are unanimous in affirming that the oldest inhabitants of Casamance are the Bainuk people and that the left bank of the mouth of the river was first populated by the Jola. Portuguese sailors reached the west African coast in the 15th century, and in the 16th century, Portuguese traders became active in the Casamance region, mostly in search of wax, ivory, and slaves. They did not linger on "Mosquito Island", instead founding their first trading post at Ziguinchor in 1645.

In the late 1820s, a mulatto trader from Gorée, Pierre Baudin, moved to Itou and began planting rice and producing lime by crushing the shells of mangrove oysters and cooking them in lime kilns. The French administration treated Baudin as their representative on the island and did not send others because few of the French wanted to live on the island. Being wet and marshy, Carabane had a reputation for its poor sanitation. The local economy was based mainly on weedy rice, which was sold in Ziguinchor or to the British in The Gambia. The Baudin family used slaves to produce the rice and, despite the declaration of its official abolition in the French colonial empire in 1848, slavery continued on the island until the early 20th century.

The colonial administration wanted to expand its influence around the river, particularly because the inhabitants of Gorée were threatened with losing part of their resources with the imminent demise of the slave trade, and also because of their competition with Saint-Louis. On January 9, 1836, Lieutenant Malavois, who was in charge of Gorée, left for Casamance in search of a site for a trading post. The tip of Diogue, on the north shore, was first considered, but at the refusal of the Jola, it was the opposite bank which was eventually accepted.

=== French colonization ===
On January 22, 1836, the island was ceded to France by the village leader of Kagnout at an annual cost of 196 francs. Still, another treaty made Sédhiou the primary trading post of Casamance, and the exploitation of Carabane was left for some time in the hands of the Baudin family, first Pierre then his brother Jean. Each successively took on the title of Resident. With this official but ambiguous title, they were permitted to continue their trading operation so long as they regularly reported to France.

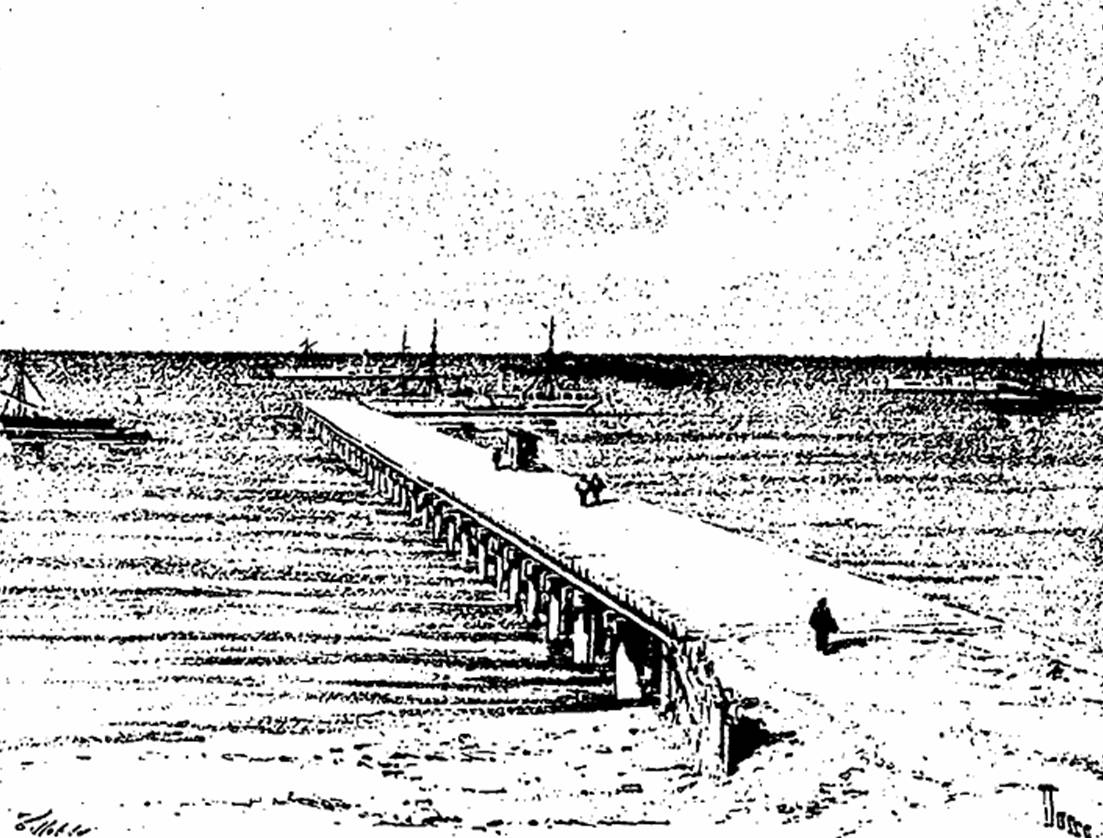
The longest pier on the coast of Africa

When Jean Baudin fell into disgrace due to a serious incident involving an English ship, he was replaced as Resident in October 1849 by Emmanuel Bertrand-Bocandé. This multilingual, enterprising businessman and entomologist from Nantes transformed "his" island, sparking a resurgence of commercial and political activity. In 1852, the population surpassed 1,000 inhabitants. A cadastral map assigned tracts of 30 square metres (320 sq ft) to traders and contractors. Other tracts of 15 square metres (160 sq ft) were allotted for housing. Provisional concessions were granted to residents of Saint-Louis and Gorée. Other than settlers, the island was mainly inhabited by animist Jola farmers, whose practices were disconcerting to the settlers. Coexistence was not always easy. Christianity was practiced by the Europeans and some of the residents of Gorée, although the island did not yet have a church. Missionaries tried but were not permitted to settle on the island.

The construction of a wharf 116 metres (381 ft) long allowed the berthing of larger vessels coming in from Casamance. A railed pier was built along the river in order to facilitate the transfer of goods. Carabane exported rice, but also cotton, considered to be of poor quality, which was ginned in a factory built by Bertrand-Bocandé in 1840, owned first by Maurel & Prom and then by the Casamance Company. The factory also produced almonds and crabwood (Carapa procera).

Bertrand-Bocandé became involved in local African politics during his time as Resident. When an intertribal conflict led to an armed raid of Carabane, he mediated the conflict. In 1850, the island's economic growth was disturbed because of an extensive livestock raid which precipitated further incidents the following year. In response to this conflict with the former owners of Carabane, the residents of Kagnout, Bertrand-Bocandé convinced the governor of Senegal to send a warship to Carabane to frighten off the raiders. This single ship failed to faze the island's opponents, therefore Bertrand-Bocandé requested a detachment of soldiers and several other ships from the governor. When these reinforcements arrived from Gorée, the conflict was successfully ended. A treaty was signed on March 25, establishing the sovereignty of France not only in Casamance, but also in Kagnout and Samatit. For his involvement in the conflict, Bertrand-Bocandé was accepted into the Légion d'honneur and was given a land concession. Bertrand-Bocandé left the island in 1857 for a leave of absence, but he abandoned his post as Resident in 1860. His tireless activity had a lasting effect on the island.

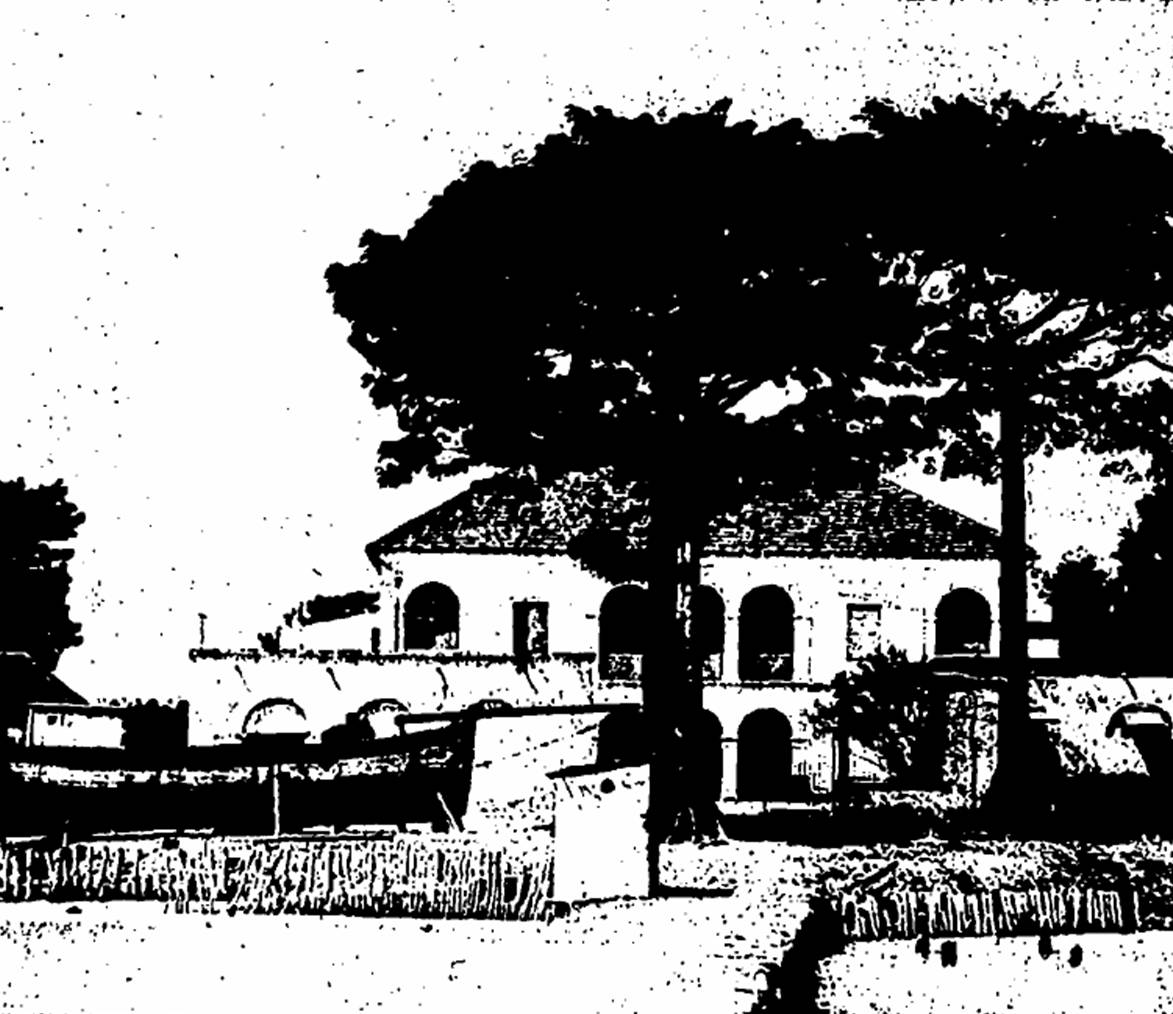
The Casamance Company's first factory (1893 engraving)

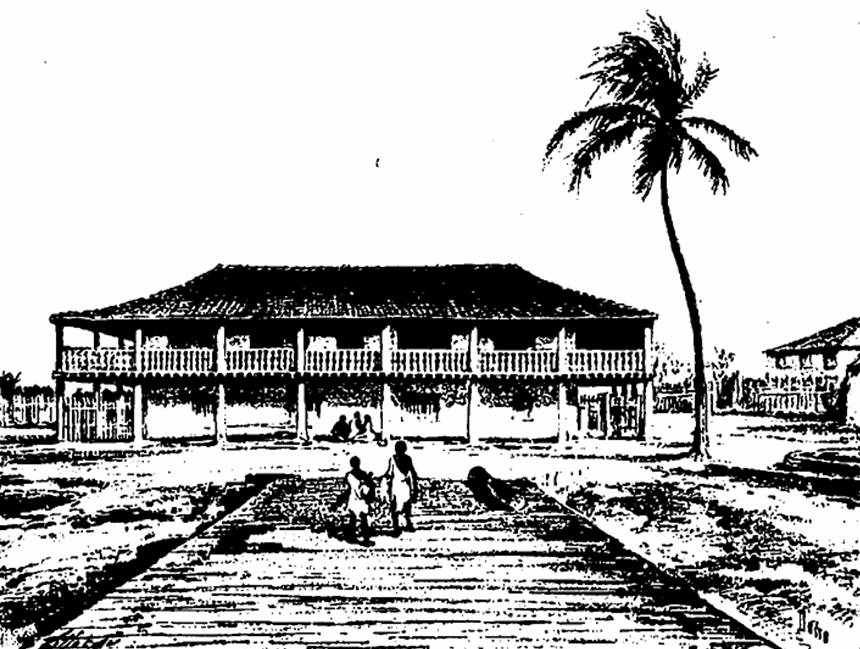
The Casamance Company's second factory

Meanwhile, the inhabitants of the new French territory did not recognize the authority of the treaties imposed upon them. For this reason, rice farmers in Carabane experienced lootings and abductions by the Karoninka people. Troops led by Émile Pinet-Laprade attacked the Karoninka villages in March 1860, forcing them to submission. A period of calm ensued. While the Mandinka Muslims continued, illegally, to practice slavery and trade, non-Muslim villages tended to come together, accepting the Resident of Carabane as the arbitrator of their disagreements.

In 1869, Carabane became autonomous, but it merged with Sédhiou in 1886. Its garrison of a dozen men was regularly stricken with tropical diseases such as malaria. In 1877, 527 people were counted on the island, mostly Jola, but also some Wolofs, Muslims, and a few Manjacks from Portuguese Guinea.

The first Catholic mission in Sédhiou was founded in 1875 and the first baptisms were celebrated that same year in Carabane. There were 17 people baptised in total, most of whom were residents of the island. The Holy Ghost Fathers' mission in Carabane was founded in 1880 by Father Kieffer. On February 22, he settled on the island, but he served for only two years. The staff of the colonial administration was small: the manager of a customs post with four employees, a gunner, a corporal, and six European tirailleurs. There were approximately 250 Christians in Carabane, mostly mulattos. The priest built his house out of Palmyra palm trunks. He visited nearby villages and sometimes went to Sédhiou. The founding of the mission in Carabane was followed by others in Ziguinchor (1888), Elinkine (1891), and several nearby locations in the 20th century. In 1900, a Spiritan missionary, Father Wintz, (Note: In 1909, Father Wintz wrote a French—Jola dictionary published by the Elinkine Mission, and reedited in 1968.) wrote the first catechism in the Jola language.

Temporarily transferred to Ziguinchor, the Carabane mission closed in 1888. Missionaries returned in 1890 and, although they immediately expanded the church building, it was still not large enough to accommodate all those who wished to attend. Thanks to subsidies by the bishop, Magloire-Désiré Barthet, and to donations by the parishioners, a new church was built and inaugurated on the Catholic feast day of Saint Anne in 1897. The mission also obtained two adjacent properties, lot #73 on the cadastral map. By the following year, the Christian community had performed 1,100 baptisms, as well as many catechumen.

Competition between the French and the Portuguese began to show itself in the region during this period. Because the Portuguese-operated trading posts in Cacheu and Farim asked for higher prices than the French-operated trading posts in Carabane and Sédhiou, the Portuguese lost many traders to the French. This trend led to the ceding of Ziguinchor to France, which was negotiated in Carabane in April 1888 between Commissioner Oliveira and Captain Brosselard-Faidherbe.

In 1901, the administrative capital of Casamance was transferred from Carabane to Ziguinchor, a status which was transferred in turn to Oussouye two years later. By 1904, Carabane had lost several of its amenities, including its customs services, which were centralized. The island's trading houses were abandoned and the number of Christians dwindled from 1,000 to 300 by 1907.

Despite the anti-clerical movement's growth in France at the time, education in Carabane continued to be administered by the Holy Ghost Fathers for the boys and by the Sisters of St. Joseph of Cluny for the girls. A chapel also continued to be run on the island.

In 1913, just before the outbreak of World War I, Carabane suffered a fire which caused its business to decline. People gradually left the island in search of work in Ziguinchor and even Dakar. In December 1915, Marcel de Coppet, administrator of Ziguinchor, visited the island in order to recruit tirailleurs. Six inhabitants of the island accepted the position: a Christian, a pagan, and four Muslims.

In the aftermath of the Great War, the Roman Catholic Church encountered great difficulties in the region. There was insufficient staffing, the cost of living was rising, and the harsh climate began to wear on the buildings. In 1920, the diocese had, in addition to Carabane, thirteen churches and approximately thirty-five chapels. The thirteen churches were located in Dakar, Saint-Louis, Gorée, Rufisque, Thiès, Ngazobil, Joal, Fadiouth, Foundiougne, Kaolack, Ziguinchor, Bignona and Banjul. In 1922, the Governor decreed which buildings were authorized to practise Catholicism. While the Carabane church was one of the buildings selected, some members blamed the colonial administration for having facilitated the expansion of Islam in the country.

In taking leadership of the diocese, Archbishop Le Hunsec noted that the island of Carabane, heavily populated when trading was concentrated there, had lost its influence and now had fewer than 500 inhabitants. He considered transferring the mission to Oussouye, which became a reality in 1927. Starting in 1937, the mission in Oussouye also performed baptisms and funerals in Carabane.

In the same year, a reform school was created on the island, operating until 1953, when it was replaced by another in Nianing. A report submitted in 1938 by an educational advisor to Marcel de Coppet, Governor General of French West Africa, detailed the daily life of the prisoners in the school which housed up to 22 boys, mostly convicted for theft but also occasionally for murder.

=== Recent history ===
Carabane's population continued to decline gradually after World War II. In 1950, the construction of a seminary was planned in Carabane, but it was transferred to a new building in Nyassia in 1959. The Carabane mission closed its doors during the wet season of 1953, 83 years after its inception. The nuns and their interns moved to Ziguinchor.

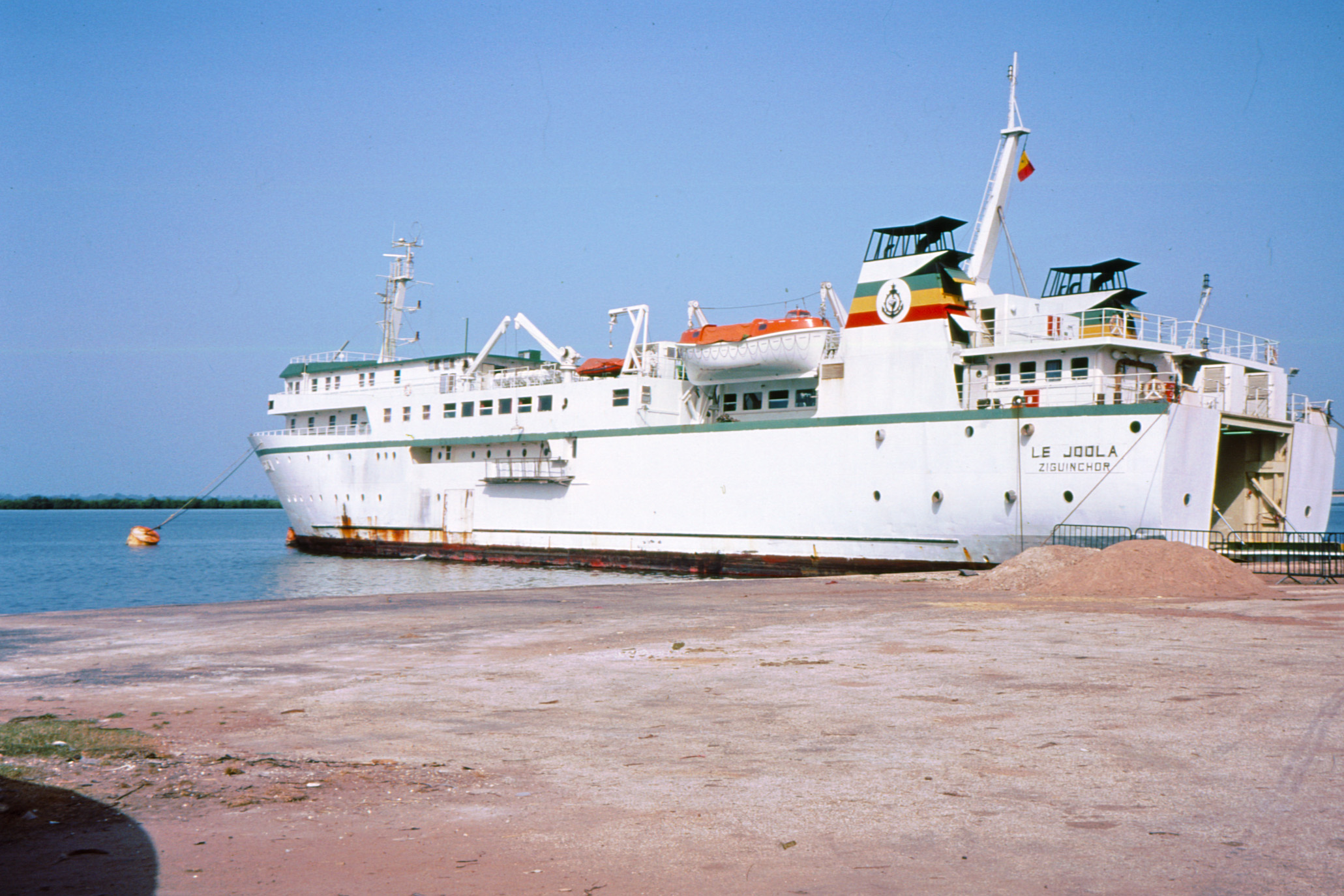
The sinking of the Joola (pictured) in 2002 claimed the lives of many inhabitants of Carabane and curtailed much of its ability to engage in trade and accept tourists.

Senegal's independence was declared on August 20, 1960, and after the dissolution of the short-lived Mali Federation, Casamance saw the arrival of officials coming from the north. Although many of them were Wolofs and Muslims, they did not know the Jola country and its traditions. The periods of drought that ravaged the Sahel in the 1970s forced peanut farmers to move to regions where rice was all that grew.

Discontent began to spread among the people, which sometimes escalated to violence. Casamance has since experienced years of conflict which put local initiatives in jeopardy, such as nature reserves and the first network of villages. In 1998, in the middle of the conflict, the French commune of Bon-Encontre committed to providing Carabane with humanitarian aid, both economically and culturally. Carabane has remained one of the calmest areas of Casamance throughout the conflict. Nonetheless, a few small incidents were reported around April 2000. The rebels may have wanted to take advantage of Carabane's reputation to attract media attention.

The ceasefire of 2004 brought relative peace, but in the meantime, the sinking of the Joola in 2002 claimed the lives of many inhabitants of Carabane and curtailed much of its ability to engage in trade and accept tourists for several years. Considering the problems brought on by the conflict along with the threat of coastal erosion on the island, some fear the worst. Thus, after years of development and community outreach, Carabane is experiencing difficulties in a number of ways.

== Society ==
=== Administration ===
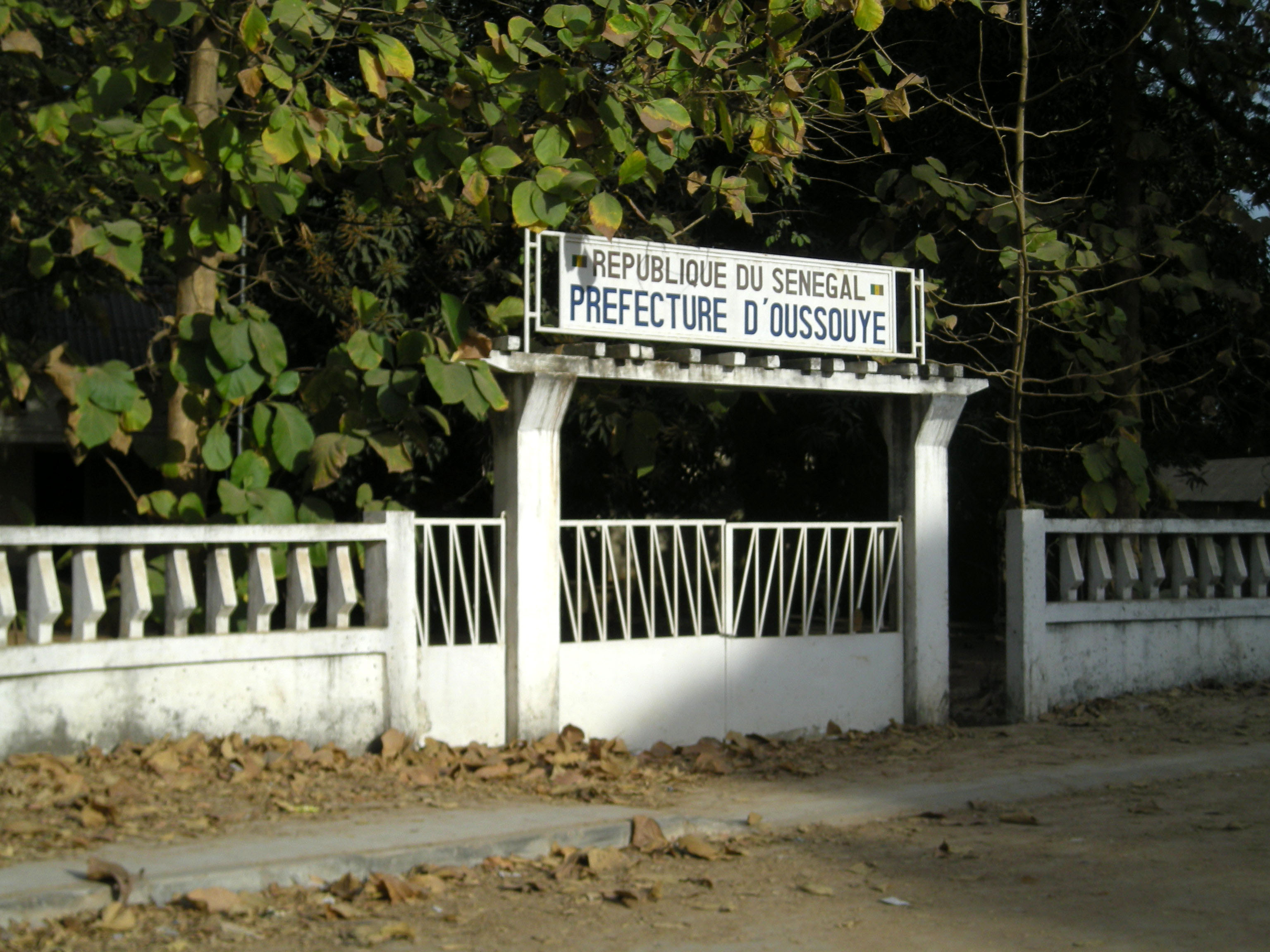
Oussouye Prefecture

Formerly an administrative district in its own right, (Note: Between 1939 and 1944, the colonial authorities of the AOF were Vichyites and anti-Gaullists, unlike those of the AEF, especially because of the governor of Chad, Félix Éboué.) even a regional capital, Carabane is now just one of 23 villages in the rural community of Diembéring, of which Kabrousse, Cap Skirring, and Boucott-Diembéring are the largest centres. This rural community is located in the Kabrousse Arrondissement. It is part of Oussouye Department, the smallest and least central of the three departments in Ziguinchor Region. In a country which includes some 13,000 villages, the village is considered, by a 1972 decree, the elementary entity in the administrative body of the nation. Each is administered by a leader, assisted by a council. After consultation, the nomination of a leader is established by the prefect and approved by the Minister of the Interior. Under Senegalese law, the leader of the village has certain prerogatives, including law enforcement, tax collection, and keeping of vital records in the village.

While this administrative structure was decreed by a government anxious to deal with interlocutors, such a restructuring has not taken place in Casamance. Jola society is devoid of any formal hierarchy. It has no leader with genuine permanent authority. Instead, there are village elders who meet when important decisions need to be made. According to Italian anthropologist Paolo Palmeri, the leader of the village has very little power in reality, as he is merely responsible for relations with the national administration. He simply allows the village to continue practicing its traditions. In a society where politics are inextricably linked to religion, the real holders of power are the fetish priests. The very notion of a village is almost inappropriate in this context: it might be more appropriately considered a clan or an aggregation of kinship. Other specialists, such as Christian Sina Diatta, compare Jola communities to those of mound-building termites, in which each member performs a specific function and where the queen is easily replaceable.

=== Population ===
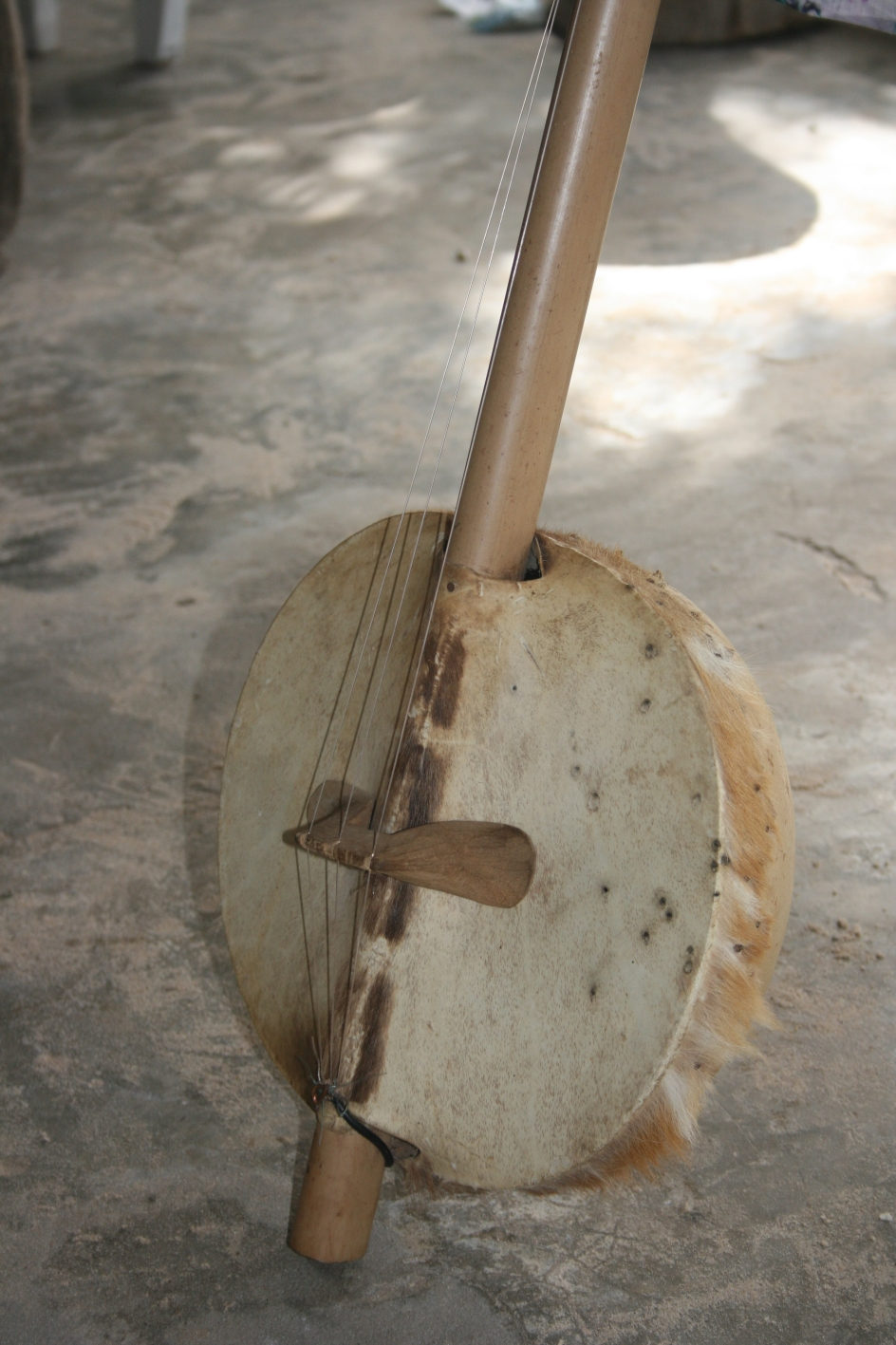
An akonting is a Jola chordophone.

In 2003, the village of Carabane's official population count stood at 396 people and 55 households, but it fluctuates with the seasons and sometimes reaches some 1,750 people, according to local sources. Most of the population is Jola. The Jola are very distinct from other major ethnic groups in Senegal by their language, egalitarian society, freedom from political hierarchy, and lack of slavery. Their traditions have persevered because of their independent spirit as well as their geographical isolation. This ethnic group accounts for 80 to 90% of the residents of Basse Casamance, but only 6 to 8% of the total population of Senegal. They are the largest ethnic group in Carabane, followed by Wolofs, Lebous, and Serers (including Niominka fishermen). Manjacks also live on the island, some of whom came from Saint-Louis and Gorée at the time of the first colonization. Two communities from neighbouring countries, one from Guinea (the Susu people) and the other from Guinea-Bissau, have settled on the other side of the island at a distance from the village. There are also seasonal workers who come to fish: Ghanaians, Guineans, and Gambians.

The indigenous population was originally animist, but while the fetishes and sacred groves dedicated to initiation rites such as boukout survive as cultural icons of Casamance, the monotheistic belief systems of Catholicism and Islam have become the most widely held in Carabane. The 1988 census reported that Muslims account for 94% of the population of Senegal, but only 26.5% of the population of Oussouye Department, where Carabane is located. Still, this department is largely rural, while Carabane has historically supported great ethnic diversity. Islam has not been practiced by Wolof and Serer fishermen since the 19th century, but the colonial administration brought with it many translators, guides, and secretaries from Dakar, many of whom were Muslim.

=== Education and health ===
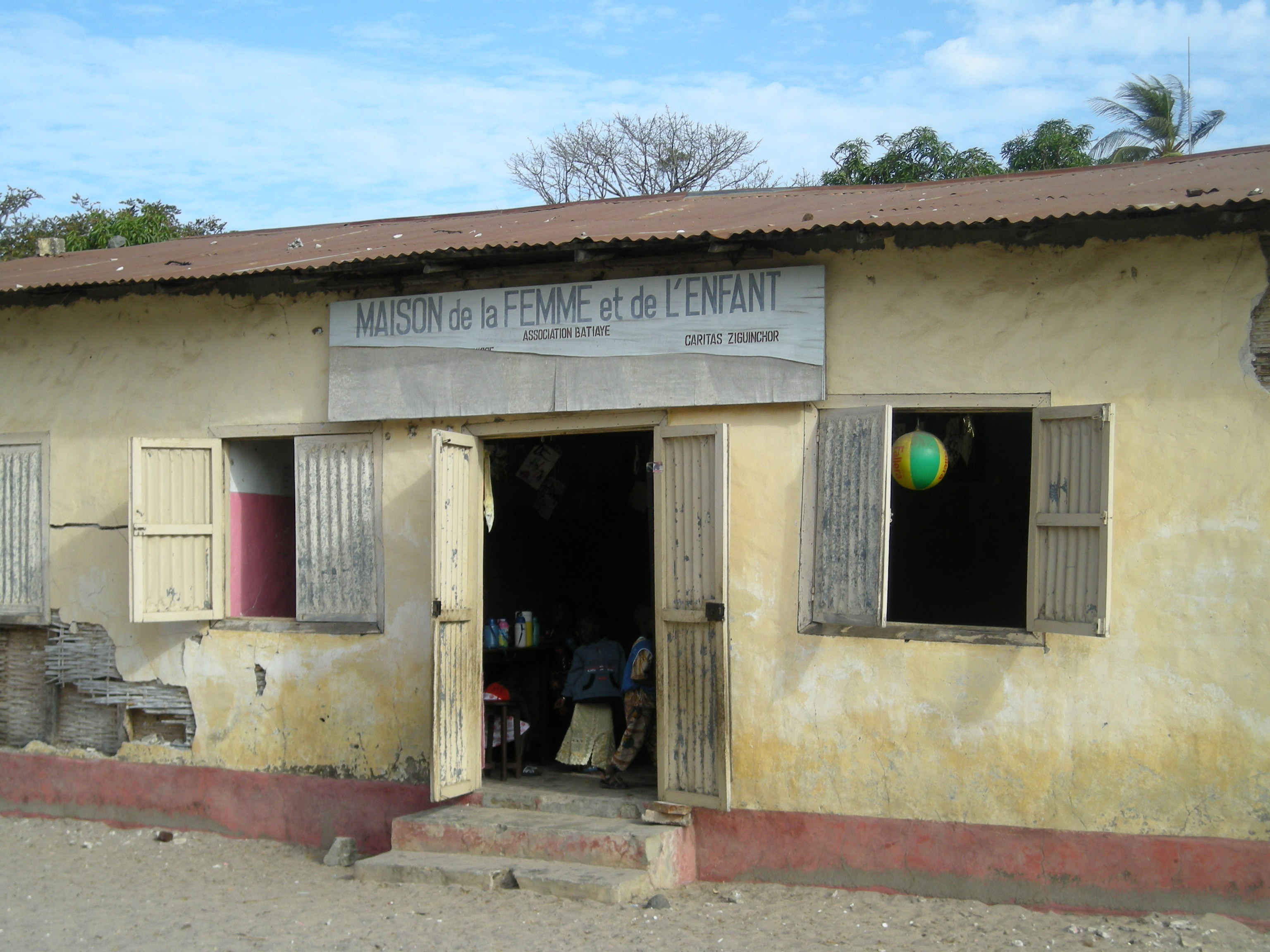
The kindergarten was founded in 1988.

Founded in 1892, the Carabane school was one of the first in the region. It began as an all-boys school, but in 1898, three nuns belonging to the indigenous congregation of the Daughters of the Holy Heart of Mary began teaching classes for girls. Soon, there were 60 students. A school infrastructure description in the region in 1900 reveals that the boys' school in Carabane was open from December to August each year, and that holidays ran from September to November, when parents needed their children in the fields to help cultivate rice. In 1903, when Carabane lost its status as capital, the school was instructing 63 boys and 102 girls. In 1914, it had only 56 boys and 26 girls, a situation similar to that in Bignona.

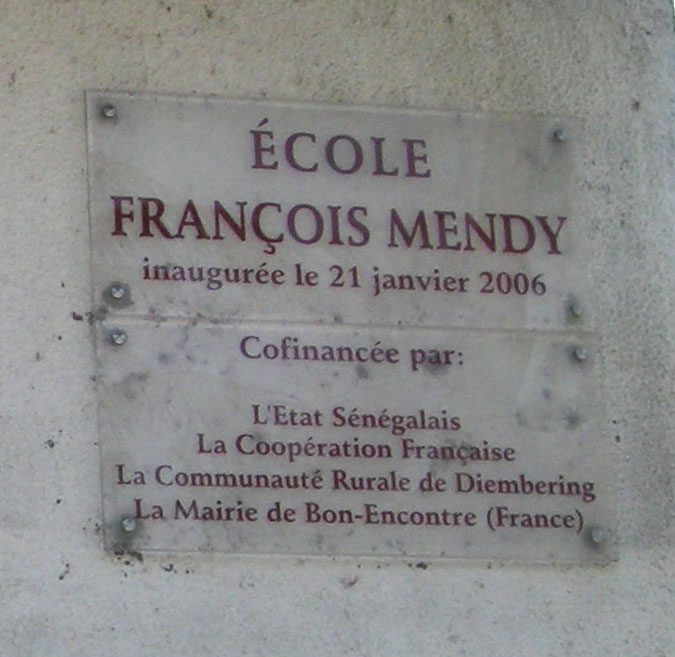
The primary school hosts six classes.

Carabane has a new primary school, École François Mendy, inaugurated on January 21, 2006, hosting six classes. The literacy rate is approximately 90%. Students may continue their studies at the middle school in Elinkine, the Aline Sitoe Diatta High School in Oussouye, and then a university in either Dakar or Ziguinchor. Carabane's kindergarten is located in a community house, called "House of Women and Children", founded in 1988 under the auspices of Caritas Ziguinchor.

In 1895, the government established a medical post in Carabane, but it closed the following year. In 1898, the Daughters of the Holy Heart of Mary opened a clinic at the same time as the girls' school.

As of 2010, the village has a health facility which is connected to that of Oussouye and Ziguinchor. It provides vaccinations, family planning consultations, and prenatal information. A maternity hospital was founded in 1991 which is decorated with a fresco by Malang Badji, one of the most famous artists in the region.

The Ph.D. thesis published in 2003, La part de l'autre: une aventure humaine en terre Diola, meaning "Part of the Other: A Human Adventure in Jola Territory", describes the health challenge present on the island in a more general context.

In particular, the location of the island does not allow easy access to serious or urgent medical assistance. There is a pirogue-ambulance for the transportation of people off the island in the case of medical emergencies.

== Economy ==
The testimonies of explorers and colonial administrators demonstrate that Carabane has participated in rice cultivation, fishery, trade, and palm wine production for centuries. The island experienced a decline in the 20th century, when Ziguinchor emerged as the regional capital, and more recently because of the negative economic consequences resulting from the Casamance Conflict and the Joola tragedy.

=== Transportation and energy ===
From the colonizers' perspective, Carabane's position at the mouth of the river was an undeniable asset. In the 20th and 21st centuries, in terms of trade and tourism issues, this location is more of a disadvantage because it effectively separates the island from the rest of the country.

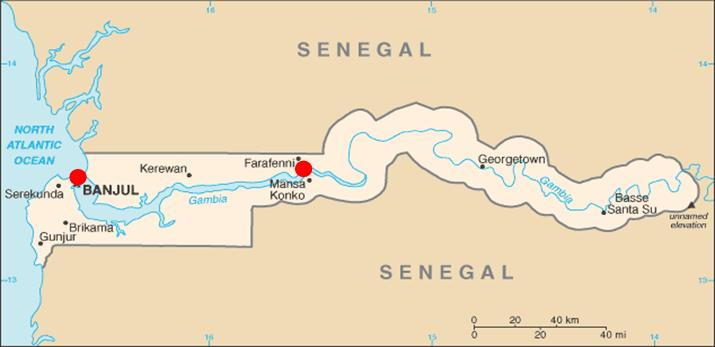
In order to arrive at Carabane from most locations in Senegal, travellers must cross The Gambia at either Banjul or Farafenni.

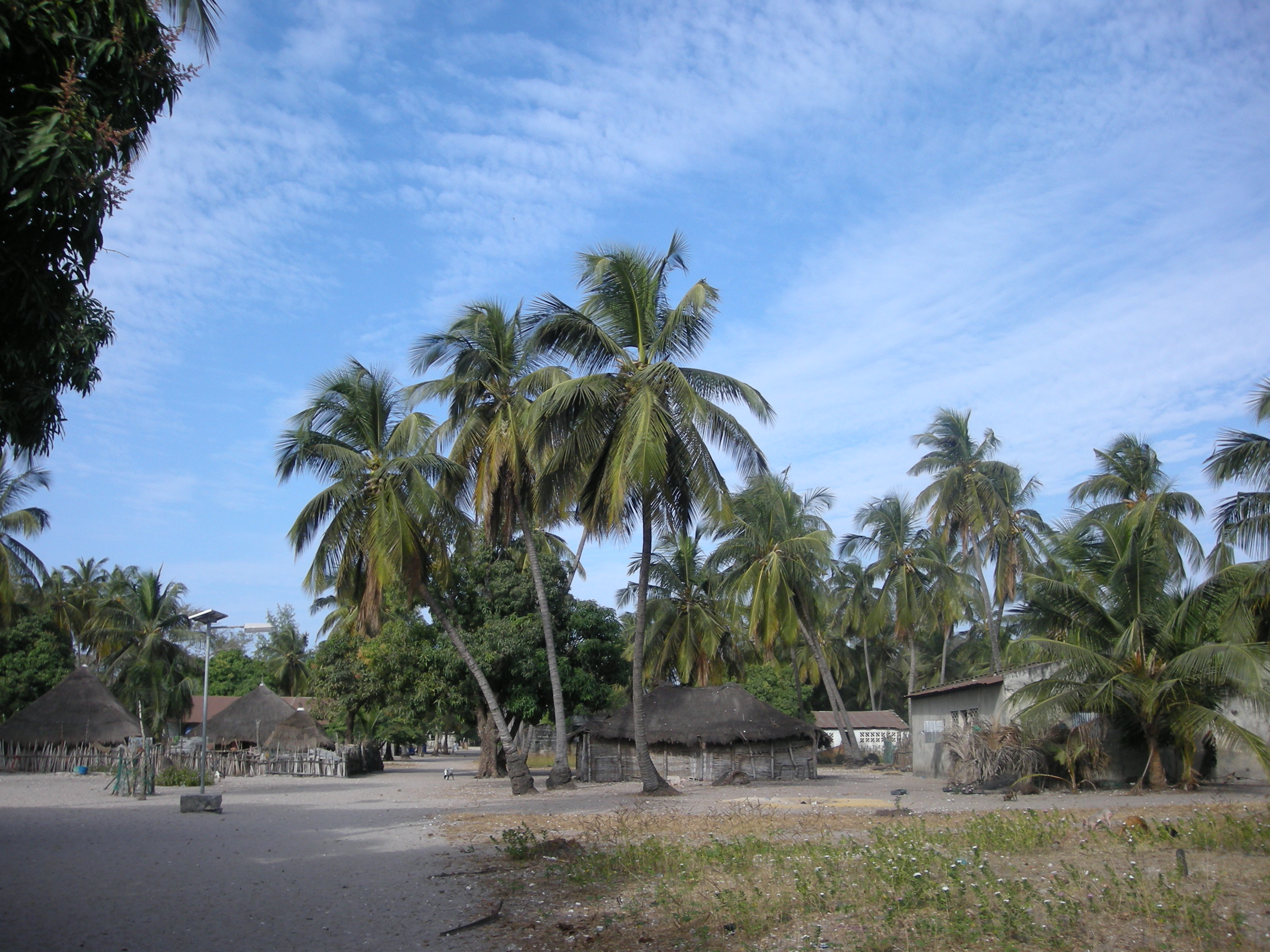
Although there are no cars on the island to drive on its wide roads, these roads are illuminated by solar-powered street lights.

While a direct route by sea has not been available since the sinking of the Joola, the traveller from Dakar may use various other means of transportation in order to arrive in Basse Casamance. Some national roads connect to Ziguinchor, down the N1 to Kaolack. The N4 and N5 roads cross the Gambia (both the country and the river), the former running through Nioro du Rip to Farafenni, and the latter crossing the river to Banjul. The two roads merge in Bignona before descending to Ziguinchor. However, traffic is forbidden on both roads between 7 p.m. and 10 a.m., and the routes are subject to frequent accidents and constant demining operations. Alternatively, it is possible to travel by plane to the airport in Ziguinchor or Cap Skirring, or to travel by boat to one of these locations. Reaching Carabane from either town is relatively straightforward.

By boat, the distance between Dakar and Carabane is 265 kilometres (143 nmi), although Ziguinchor is only 48 kilometres (30 mi) away. Before the launch of the Joola, other boats, mostly well-worn ones, made the connection: first Cap Skirring, then the Casamance Express, and then Island Karabane. In January 1991, a brand new ferry went into operation. Like its predecessors, it connected Dakar to Ziguinchor, stopping near Carabane where canoes could reach the island. On September 26, 2002, 180 extra passengers boarded the already overloaded ship at this stop, (Note: This figure does not take into account the passengers who boarded without a ticket. Members of the military and their families were allowed to ride free of charge.) and a few hours later, the Joola sank. For security reasons, the Joola's successor, the Wilis, stopped calling at Carabane, to the great displeasure of the inhabitants. Tourists became rare after that, and from time to time, inhabitants of the island found it necessary to move to Dakar or Ziguinchor. (Note: These difficulties were presented in the French documentary Un nouveau bateau pour la Casamance, meaning "A New Boat for Casamance", as part of the Thalassa series on December 1, 2006, Web.archive.org) Significant modifications to the MV Aline Sitoe Diatta, which replaced the Wilis in March 2008, were considered to allow it to stop safely at the island, and the construction of a berth was announced. Souleymane Ndéné Ndiaye, who later became Prime Minister of Senegal, laid the first stone of the berth in July 2008, and the entire construction project was financed by the Senegalese government at an estimated cost of 12 billion West African CFA francs. On April 26, 2014, the MV Aline Sitoe Diatta stopped at the Carabane berth for the first time, improving transportation for locals and tourists. As of 2015, the ferry stops at Carabane four times each week in the middle of its trips between Dakar and Ziguinchor.

=== Agriculture and aquaculture ===
==== Rice cultivation ====
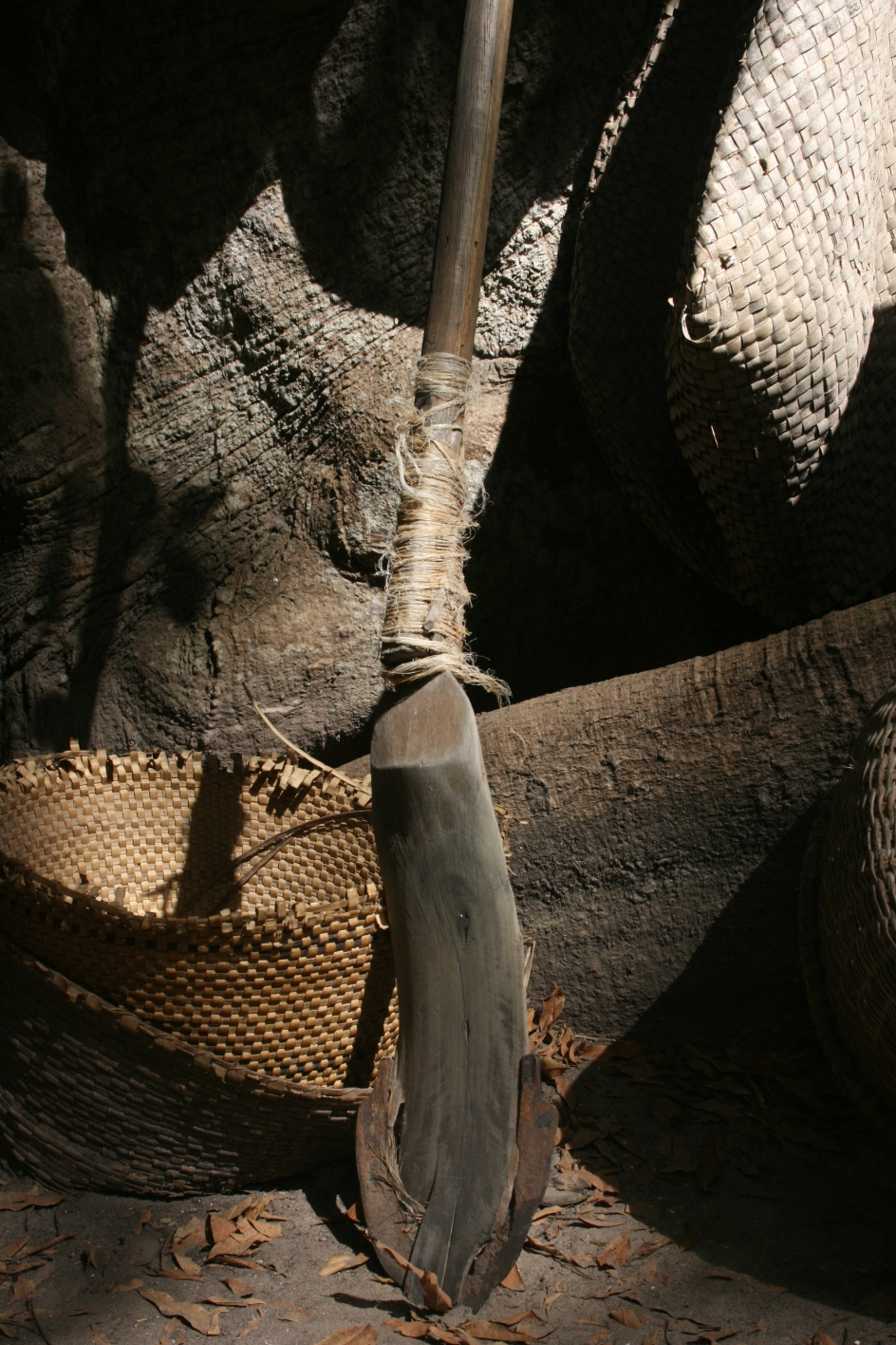
The lower part of a kayendo ends in a sharp wrought iron blade.

In Basse Casamance, the rice cycle structures the lives of the population and plays a central economic and religious role. The Jola, who constitute 80 to 90% of the population of Basse Casamance, practice a unique form of rice cultivation. Descriptions of the techniques used in the late 15th century, recorded by the first Portuguese explorers, show them to be similar to those still in use, particularly with respect to flooding and transplanting. Only the varieties of rice have changed, from African rice to Asian rice, a separate species.

The basic tool used is the kayendo, (Note: Also spelled kajandu, kajendo, kadiendo, or kadiandou) a kind of wooden spade or shovel ranging from 40 to 70 centimetres (16 to 28 in), surrounded by a sharp wrought iron blade and attached to a very long, straight, cylindrical neck. The two parts are connected by strips of torn Palmyra palm leaves. The main part is manufactured from a very hard wood measuring 2 to 2.5 metres (6 ft 7 in to 8 ft 2 in) in length. The kayendo is mainly used to plough rice fields, but is also used for other purposes, such as excavation and construction. Men perform the clearing and ploughing while the women take care of the sowing, replanting, and weeding as well as the harvesting between October and January.

An even checkerboard plot model dominates the green landscape during the rainy season, which becomes more austere after harvest. The rice fields differ only in terms of soil type and location. Where mangroves are populous, such as in Carabane, the rice paddy fields between them must be protected from the channels of saltwater which overflow during high tide. Rice farmers must therefore build levees, dig ditches, and create ponds. The fish and shrimp which subsequently become trapped are harvested at the end of the rainy season, when the basins are emptied. The plots of land which were safeguarded from flooding are then cleared and ploughed. Several years of drainage are required to desalinate the soil.

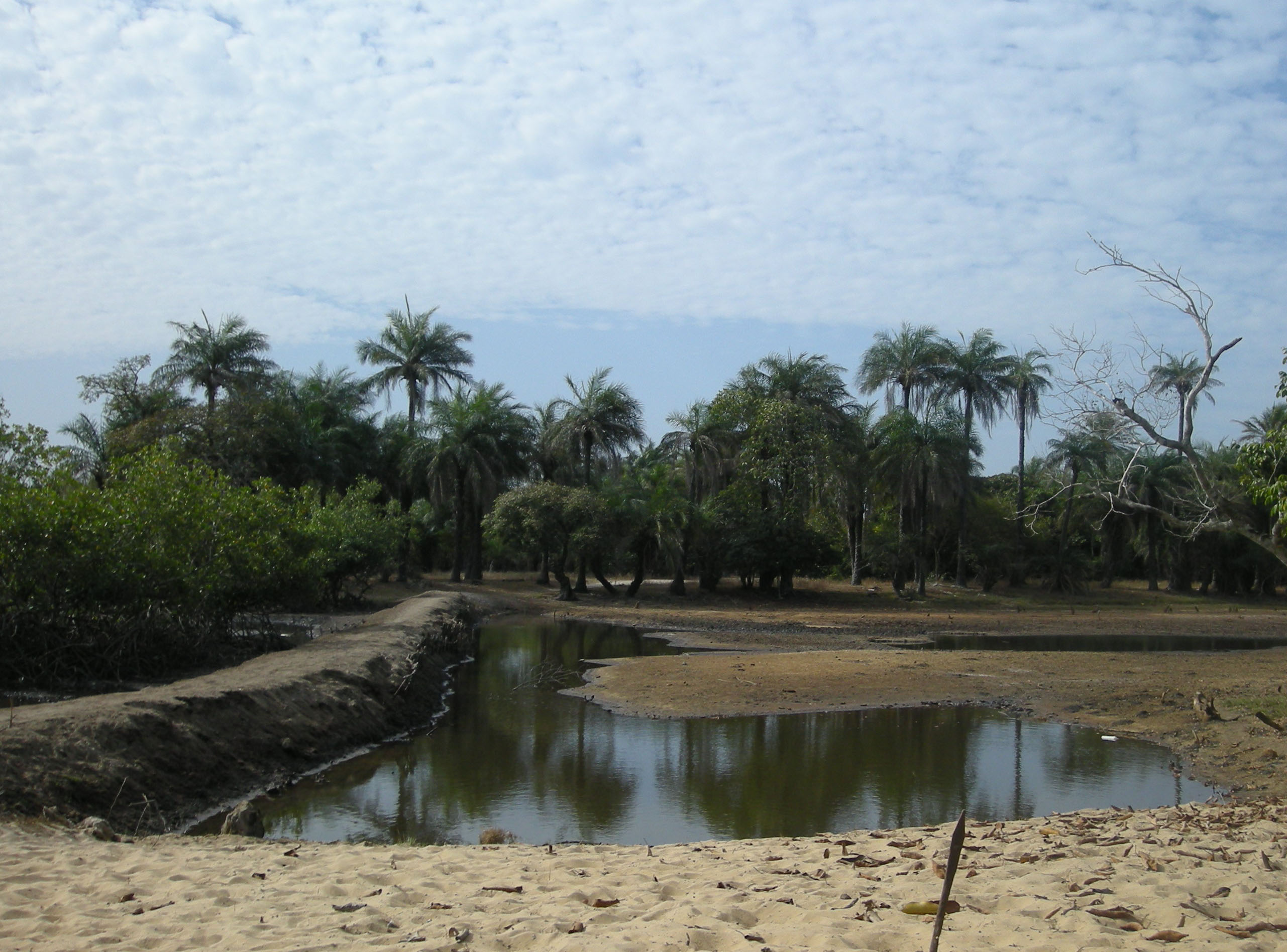
Levees are used to protect the rice paddy fields from the channels of saltwater which overflow during high tide.

Although practised in Basse Casamance for centuries, rice cultivation has been threatened since the late 1960s. Productivity has declined because many workers have opted for life in the city, even though they continue to support their community. The drought of the 1970s and 1980s further aggravated the situation.

==== Palm oil and palm wine ====
Among the agricultural activities practised during the dry season, which halts work in the rice fields, the most traditional are those related to the exploitation of African oil palm (Elaeis guineensis), which provides two products which are very popular in the region: palm oil and palm wine. Palm oil is an essential ingredient in local cuisine. As a carefully preserved condiment, it is combined with plain rice on holidays. The oil comes from the fruit clusters which are picked by men and then deseeded, allowed to dry, crushed in a mortar, and boiled by women.

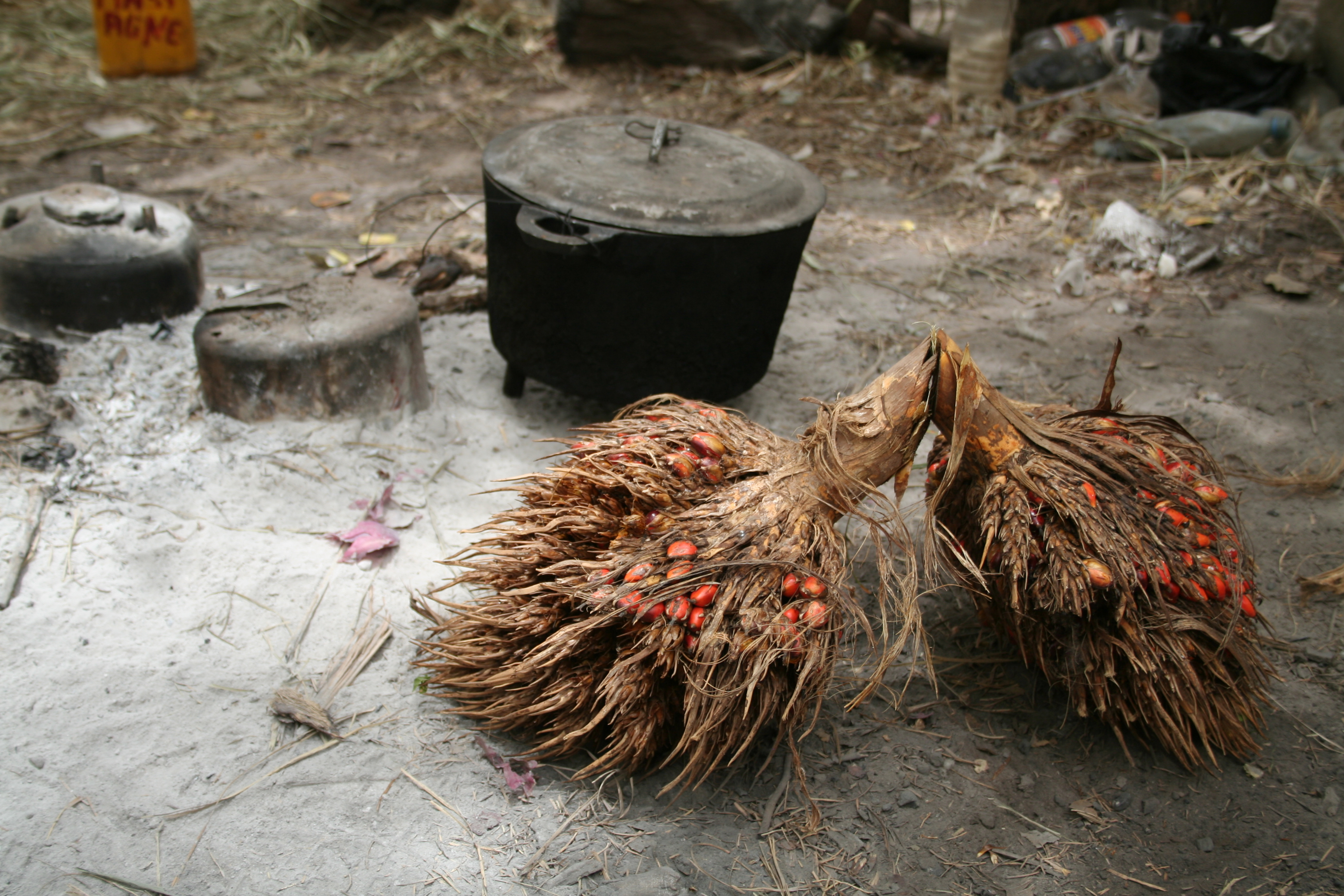
Oil palm fruit clusters are integral to the local cuisine.

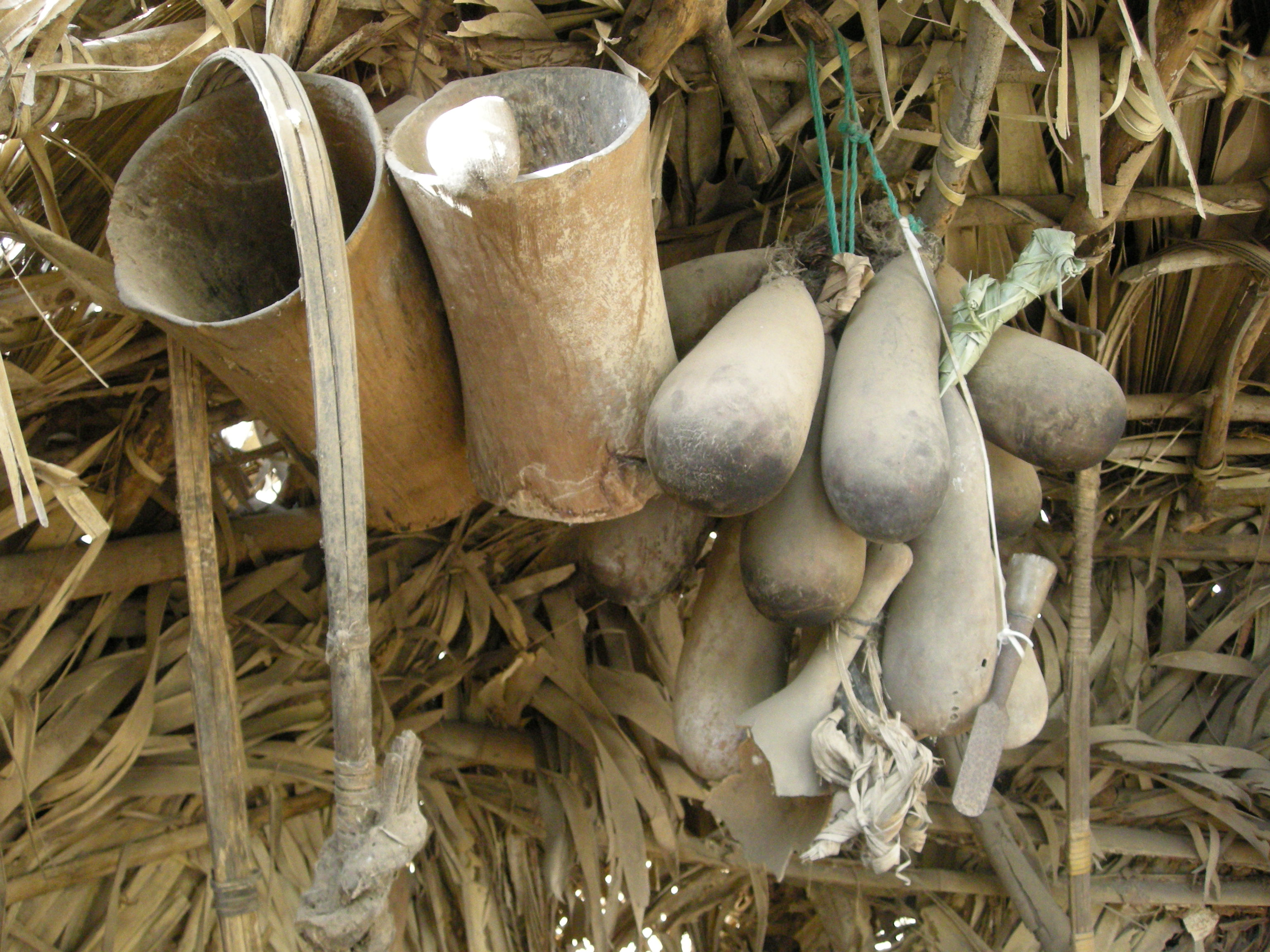
Equipment for harvesting palm wine traditionally includes the calabash; however, this natural container has mostly been replaced by synthetic bottles.

Palm wine (called bunuk or bounouk in the Jola language) is an alcoholic drink derived from the natural fermentation of palm sap, so is not strictly a wine, which is produced by the fermentation of grapes. The recent partial Islamization of the region has not challenged its consumption. Fruit clusters are collected exclusively by the men. Supported by a strap, the harvester climbs the tree, cuts the bud, and holds out a funnel which allows the resulting fluid to flow drip by drip into an elongated calabash or, more recently, a bottle. The alcohol content of palm wine develops throughout the day. The locals consume large quantities on a daily basis, and even more at banquets and ceremonies dedicated to fetishes. Palm wine is often traded for rice or sold in the city. Many Jola proverbs attest the popularity of the drink, such as Bunuk abajut birto, which means "With palm wine, one never stands up", or Ulako, kumusaet jígabulaju, which means "Sit down, don't spill the palm wine".

==== Aquaculture ====
The island's proximity to the river and the ocean suggests that the area is suited to fishing and related activities, yet the indigenous people, mostly land-dwellers, have long been content to practise artisan fishing, just to supply their own daily needs. Pirogues cut from the trunks of kapok trees are most often used, along with traps, nets, baskets, and fences. In the early 20th century, experienced fishermen from other parts of Senegal, along with others from Mali, Guinea, and Ghana, developed deep-sea fishing on the island and introduced new equipment.

The collection of shellfish, especially oysters, is another traditional activity which still takes place in Casamance, which is one of three oyster-producing regions in Senegal, along with Petite Côte and Sine-Saloum. Oysters collect on the roots of mangrove trees which are uncovered at low tide. They are harvested during the dry season, mainly by women, who control, from harvest to distribution, an activity that requires little investment and provides them with some financial independence. Oysters are an important component of the family diet. Rich in dietary minerals and vitamin C, they are the second largest source of animal protein among the Jola people after fish, followed by chicken, and pork. Oysters are readily associated with rice, the staple food, and in times of shortage, even replace it. Locally, oysters are boiled or grilled on a wood fire and consumed with a spicy sauce. Those destined for sale or preservation, however, are sun-dried or smoked. In some villages, including Carabane, they are kept alive for several weeks before being transported to market. Oysters are also a source of income, and Carabane is located in the center of the collection zone, which is one of the reasons why boats formerly called at the island. Oysters were once easily transported from Carabane to Dakar, where they were either sold by the pickers themselves or by hawkers.

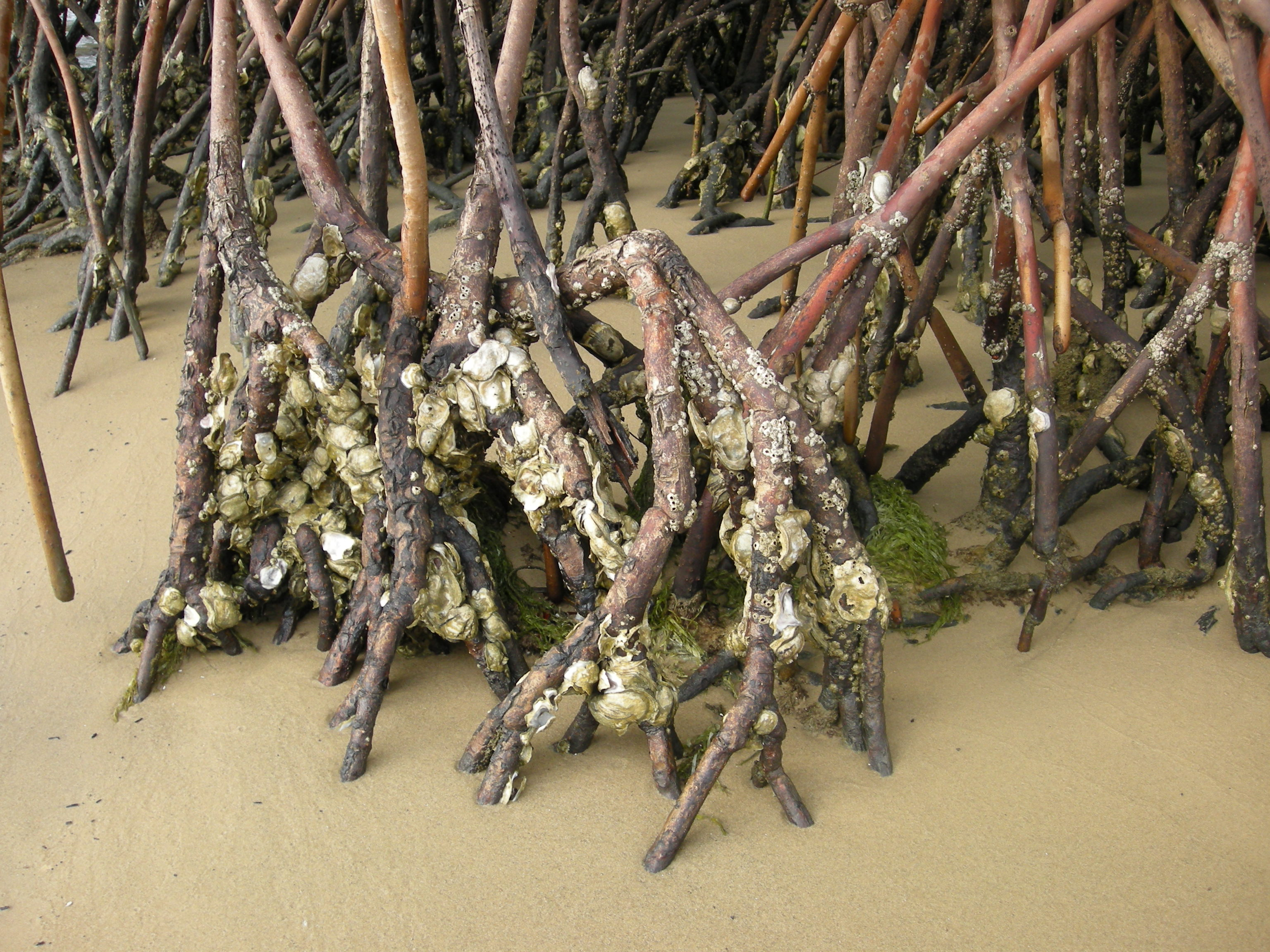
Mangrove oysters collect on the roots of mangrove trees.

Crustaceans, such as sand fiddler crabs and shrimp, among the mangroves also occupy a significant place in the local economy. While a large number of shrimp species inhabit the Senegambian area, a single family exists in Casamance: Penaeidae. Southern pink shrimp (Farfantepenaeus notialis) are the most commonly collected. They were traditionally caught as part of local artisan fishing by men, women, and children. Shrimp collection in the area experienced significant development in the 1960s, following the establishment of European industrial units. The local fishermen switched to this method, and there was an increased presence of fishermen from other areas. A study in 2005 revealed the extent to which the shrimp population in the region has been depleted, citing multiple causes, including diminishing rainfall, over-salinization of the estuary, and poorly controlled harvesting. Along with the mangrove degradation, the civil unrest, and the inadequate fishery regulation, Casamance has had to deal with the closure in 2003 of a major industrial complex in Ziguinchor which treated and exported shrimp and other crustaceans and employed more than 2,000 people.

Grouped into cooperatives, (Note: An example of a cooperative run by women: "Ujamoral Kafakh Group". Kiva.) women play a leading role in the island's economy. Notably through microcredit, they engage in fishing-related activities, such as smoking fish and processing shrimp, oysters, and shellfish in general. As there is no industrial activity on the island (the closest such activity is in Ziguinchor), the island is experiencing a rural exodus of young people. They return to help their parents in the rice fields and participate in religious ceremonies during the dry season, but they tend to settle off the island permanently.

=== Tourism ===
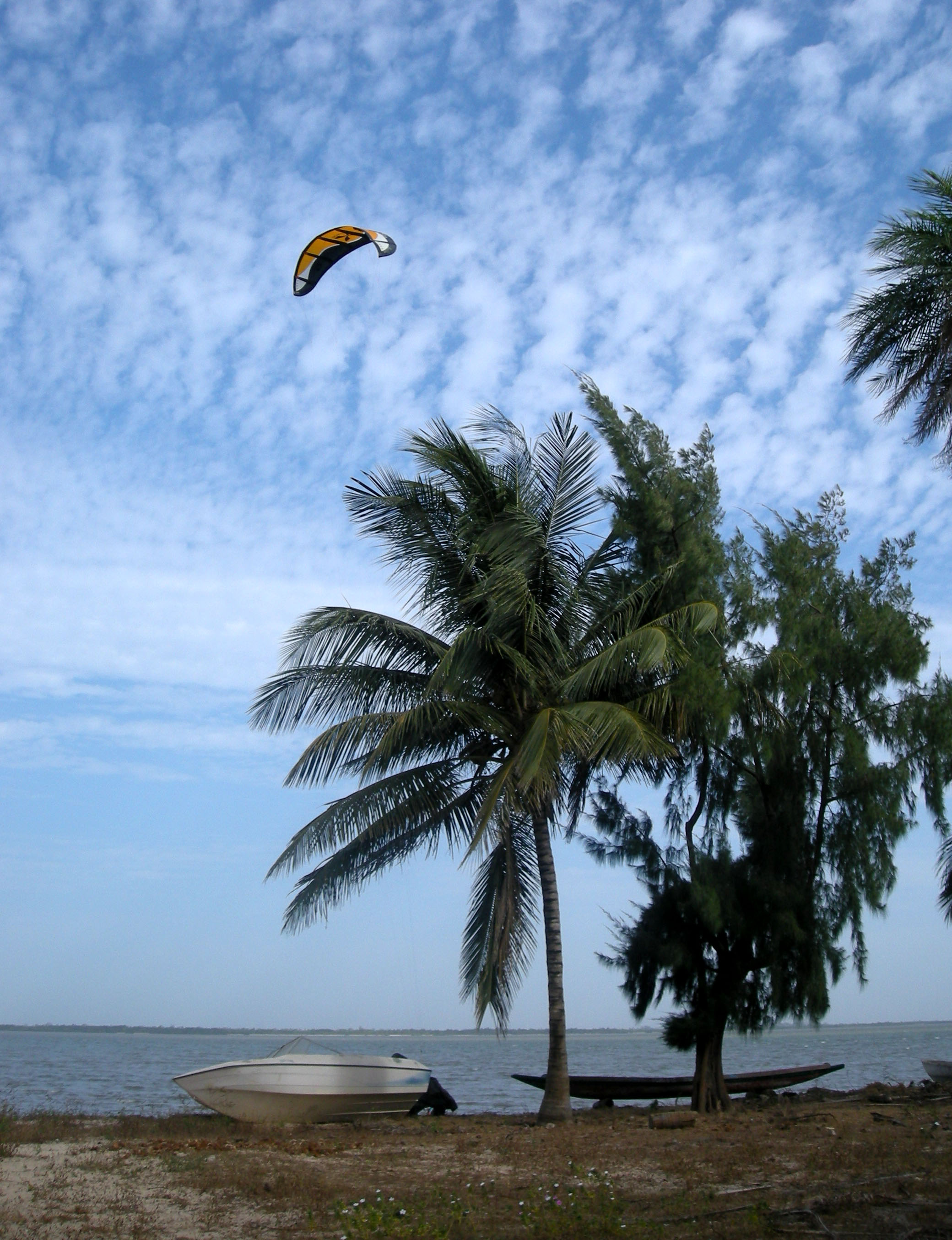
Kitesurfing is a common tourist activity in Carabane.

The Republic of Senegal placed an emphasis on tourism early in its history. The results were promising, and developing the industry further became a priority in the country's 4th Economic and Social Plan (1973–1977). Casamance subsequently became the main tourist destination in the country. Already having been described in the 19th century by Captain Brosselard-Faidherbe as a kind of Brazil in Africa, Carabane seemed well-placed to attract visitors in search of exoticism as well as vacationers seeking sandy beaches and kite surfing.

At the same time, national and even international controversy threatened the industry from the beginning. Those who opposed tourism in Senegal described it as a new form of colonialism while supporters saw it as a panacea that would cure the country of underdevelopment. The idea of alternative tourism was discussed. Several towns in Basse Casamance, including Carabane, were selected to test an integrated agritourism managed by the villagers themselves. In the early 1970s, the agritourism promoter Christian Saglio, a young French sociologist who later became the director of the Leopold Sedar Senghor French Institute in Dakar, believed in Carabane's potential. He stated that he wanted to make the island the "Gorée of Casamance", using it as a hub for other camps. Saglio suggested the restoration of old buildings and canopy beds.

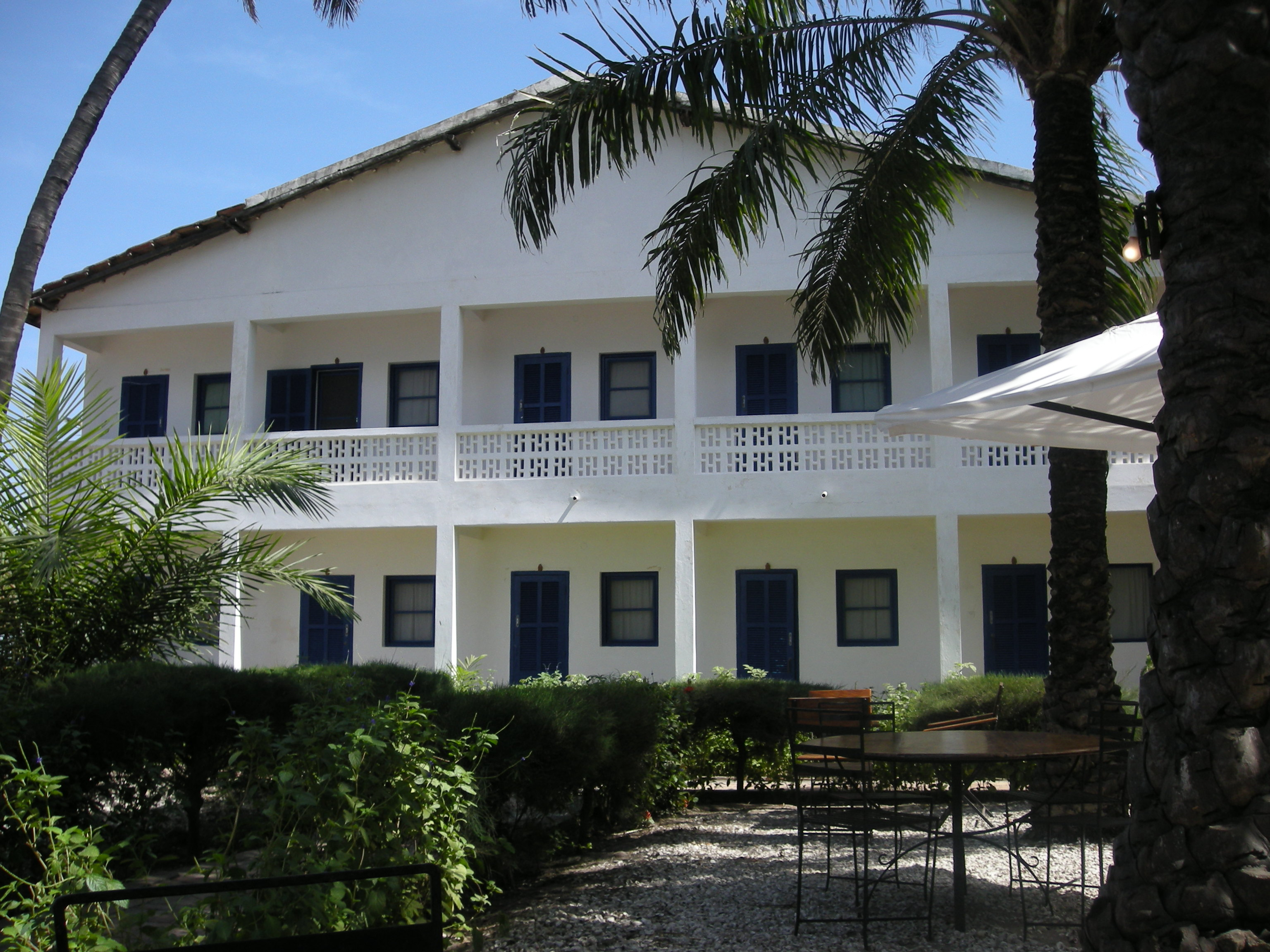
The Catholic mission house built in 1880 has since been turned into a hotel.

Despite his fervour, Saglio's negotiations with the local people were unsuccessful. Niomoune and Carabane were the first two villages to attempt to apply this innovative approach, but both failed. The inhabitants were reluctant to participate, and the young inexperienced promoter had to abandon some of his ethnographic theories in favour of being careful to understand the daily realities of villages. The project was eventually abandoned, and the Catholic missions house was transformed by the nuns themselves into a modern, functional building. Despite the failure of Saglio's initiative in Carabane, agritourist camps were set up over the following decade in a dozen other nearby towns. (Note: The camps were set up in Elinkine, Enampore, Baïla, Thionck Essyl, Coubalan, Affiniam, Abéné, Oussouye and Palmarin.)

While Carabane's tourism sector has suffered because it has not taken part in the network of villages, tourists have avoided travelling to Casamance in general because of the civil unrest. The signing of a ceasefire in 2004 allowed tourism to resume, but not to the extent it had reached before the conflict.

Tour operators continue to advertise the island as a lost paradise surrounded by mangroves where travellers' exotic dreams come to life, but this type of discovery tourism is not as popular as traditional beach-related tourism. Thus, visitors from France, Spain, and Italy often combine tours of the cases á impluvium in Enampore or Mlomp with a few days of relaxation in Carabane. The area is also very conducive to the interests of fishing enthusiasts. Along the beach, small stalls offer traditional crafts and clothes at prices lower than those in Cap Skirring or Saly. Badji Malang, a local painter, potter, sculptor, and poet, has created a camp in the area.

Although remaining separate from the local tourism network, Carabane has demonstrated its support for social solidarity and holism by joining GENSEN (Global Ecovillage Network Senegal), a network of Senegalese ecovillages.

=== Historic sites ===
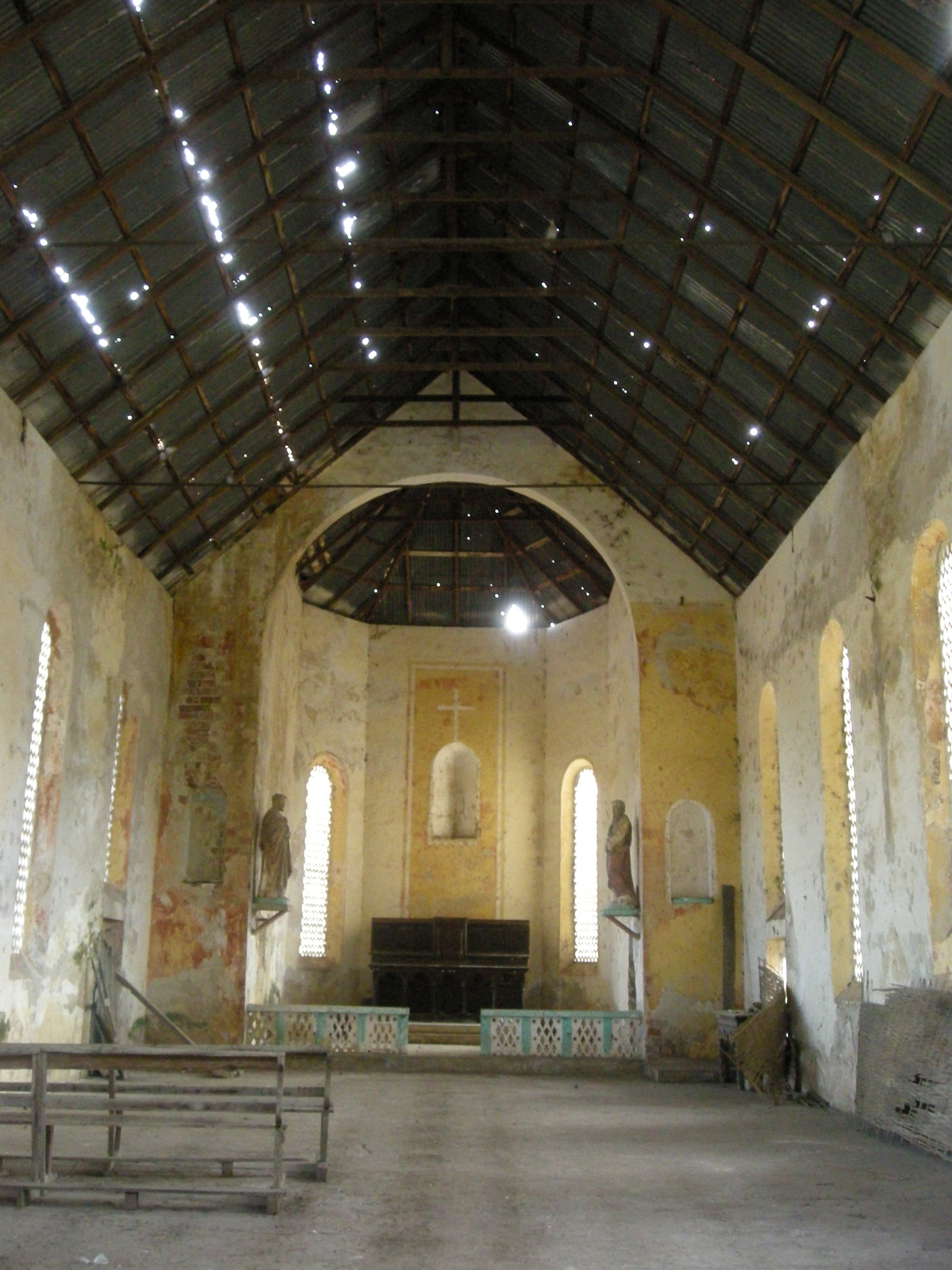
The interior of the church

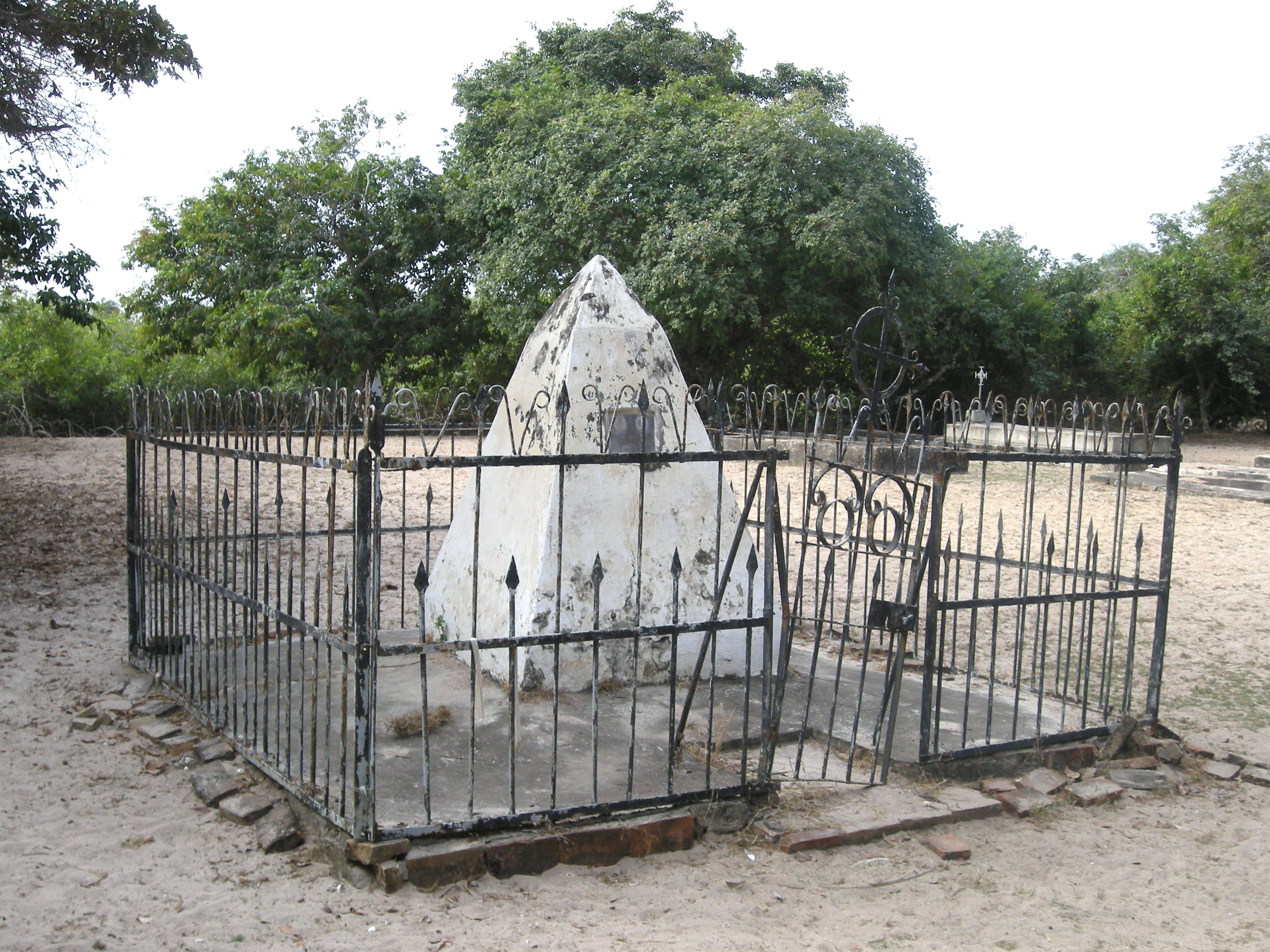
The grave of Captain Protet who was buried standing up

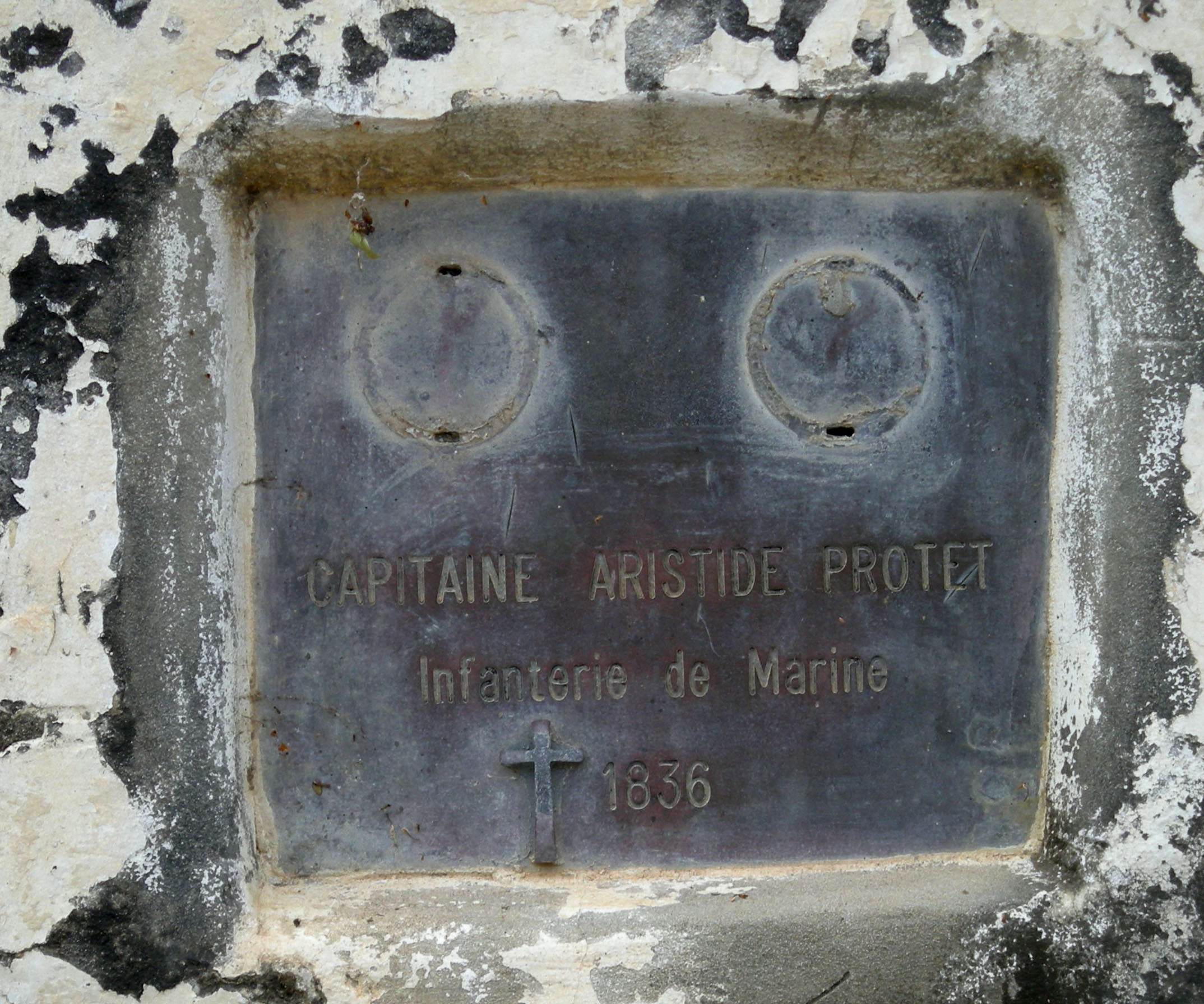
The plaque on Captain Protet's grave (died in 1836)

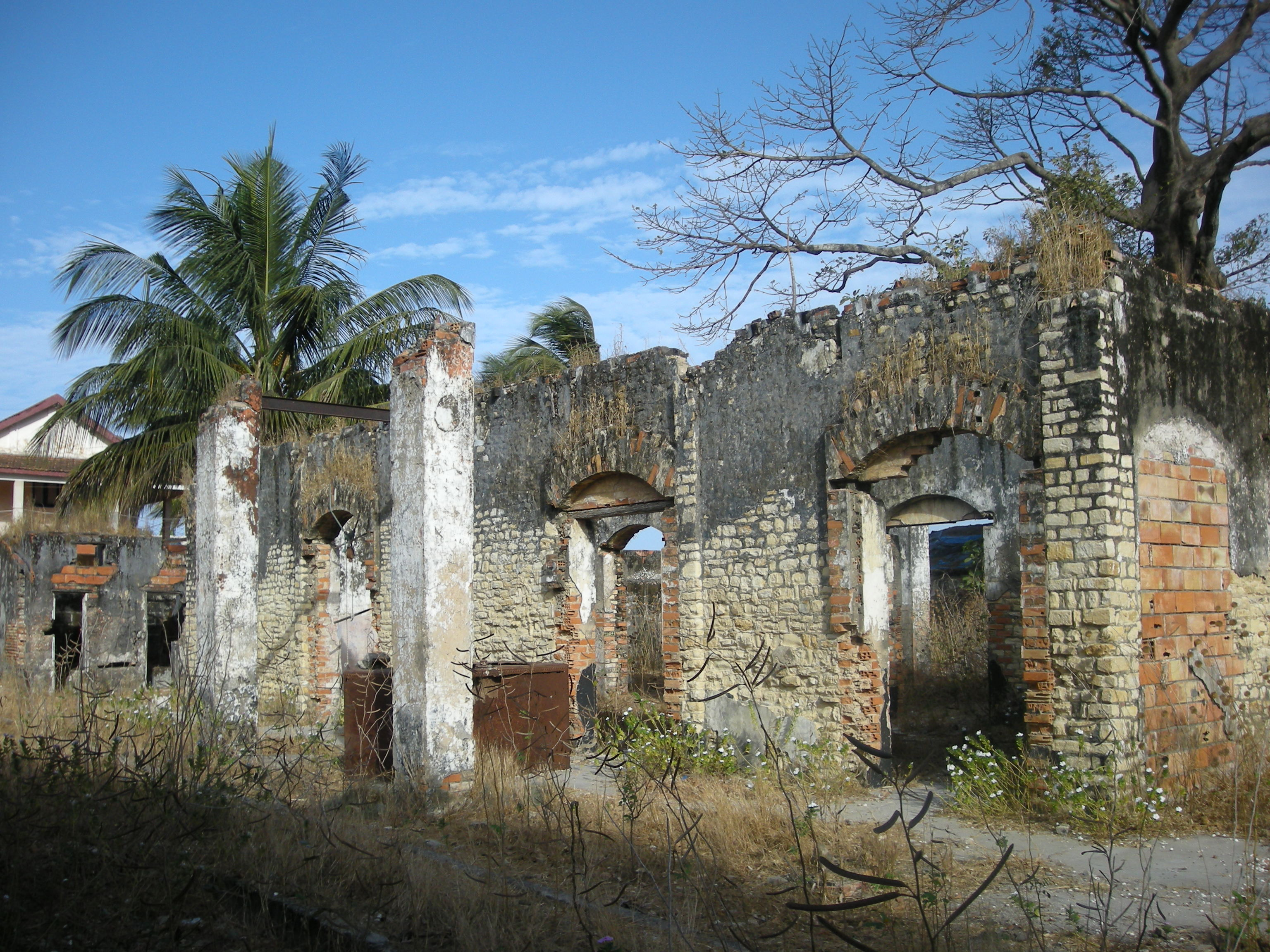
Remnants of the former colonial presence (photo taken in 2008)

Carabane has many historic sites, such as the Catholic mission house built in 1880 which has since been turned into a hotel, a Brittany-style church building which is no longer in use, and a former slave-trade building. There is also a French cemetery where a Troupes de marine-Captain with the name Aristide Protet was shot with a poisoned arrow and buried standing up in front of the sea, according to his last wishes. Some tour guides falsely claim that this was Auguste Léopold Protet, the founder of the city of Dakar, but the name Aristide Protet is clearly shown on the tomb's plaque.

Near the beach are ruins of buildings, pontoons, and wells, with a large tree in the center. A huge piece of metal in its midst bears the inscription CEO Forrester & Co. Vauxhall Foundry. 18 Liverpool S3.

Carabane was added to the list of historic sites and monuments of Senegal in 2003. An application for Carabane to become a World Heritage Site was filed with UNESCO on November 18, 2005.

Inspired by Gorée's example, Carabane is attempting to pay homage to victims of slavery by starting a small museum like the House of Slaves. Like Gorée and Saint-Louis, Carabane places great importance on its cultural heritage. The architectural reminders of this heritage require significant restoration as they have experienced considerable degradation. In 1964, French anthropologist Louis-Vincent Thomas posed the question of whether Carabane should be preserved, and this question continues to be relevant. The local people suggest that the entire Diogue–Nikine–Carabane area needs saving.

== See also ==
- Geography of Senegal
- History of Senegal
- List of islands of Senegal

== Bibliography ==
- Robert Aldrich (1996). Greater France: A History of French Overseas Expansion. New York: Palgrave Macmillan. ISBN 978-0-312-16000-5.
- Danielle Ben Yahmed (2007). Atlas du Sénégal (in French). Paris: Éditions du Jaguar. ISBN 978-2-86950-414-1.
- Barlow, Clive; Wacher, Tim; Disley, Tony (1997). A Field Guide to birds of The Gambia and Senegal. Pica Press. ISBN 978-1-873403-32-7.
- Boubacar Barry (1998). Senegambia and the Atlantic Slave Trade. Cambridge: Cambridge University Press. ISBN 978-0-521-59760-9.
- Joseph Roger de Benoist (2008). Histoire de l'église catholique au Sénégal du milieu du XVième siècle à l'aube du troisième millénaire (in French). Paris: Karthala Editions. ISBN 978-2-84586-885-4.
- Constant Vanden Berghen; Adrien Manga (1999). "Le climat". Une introduction à un voyage en Casamance: Enampor, un village de riziculteurs en Casamance, au Sénégal (in French). Paris: L'Harmattan. ISBN 978-2-7384-7961-7.
- Emmanuel Bertrand-Bocandé (May–June 1849). "Notes sur la Guinée portugaise ou Sénégambie méridionale". Bulletin de la Société de Géographie. 3 (in French). 11.
- Emmanuel Bertrand-Bocandé (July–December 1856). "Carabane et Sedhiou. Des ressources que présentent dans leur état actuel les comptoirs français établis sur les bords de la Casamance". Revue Coloniale. 2 (in French). 16: 398–421.
- Geneviève G. Beslier (1935). Le Sénégal (in French). Paris: Payot.
- Jules de Clerq, ed. (1987). "Traité conclu à Elinkine, le 25 mars 1851, entre la France et les chefs de Cagnut, pour une cession de territoire". Recueil des Traités de la France (in French). Leiden.
- Henri François Brosselard-Faidherbe (1892). Casamance et Mellacorée. Pénétration au Soudan (in French). Paris: Librairie illustrée.
- Marie-Christine Cormier-Salem (July–August 1985). "De la pêche paysanne à la pêche en mer: les Diola de la Basse Casamance (Sénégal)" (PDF). La Pêche Maritime (in French): 448–454.
- Marie-Christine Cormier (1985). "Les jeunes Diola face à l'exode rural". Cahiers de l'ORSTOM. Sciences Humaines (in French). XXI (2–3): 267–273.
- Marie-Christine Cormier-Salem (1989). "Une pratique revalorisée dans un système de production en crise: la cueillette des huîtres par les femmes diola de Basse-Casamance" (PDF). Cahiers des Sciences humaines (in French). 25 (1–2): 91–107.
- Christian Sina Diatta (1996). "L'esprit et la force dans la culture jola". Peuples du Sénégal (in French). Saint-Maur: Sépia. ISBN 978-2-907888-97-4.
- Nazaire Diatta (1998). Proverbes jóola de Casamance (in French). Paris: Karthala/ACCT. ISBN 978-2-86537-718-3.
- Lamine Diédhiou (2004). Riz, symboles et développement chez les Diolas de Basse-Casamance (in French). Québec: Université Laval. ISBN 978-2-7637-8180-8.
- Djibril Diop (2006). Décentralisation et gouvernance locale au Sénégal. Quelle pertinence pour le développement local? (in French). Paris: L'Harmattan. ISBN 978-2-296-00862-5.
- Makhtar Diouf (1998). Sénégal, les ethnies et la nation (in French). Dakar: Les Nouvelles éditions africaines du Sénégal. ISBN 978-2-7384-2118-0.
- Oscar Diedrich Engeln (1952). Geology. New York: McGraw-Hill.
- Vincent Foucher (2002). "Les "évolués", la migration, l'école: pour une nouvelle interprétation de la naissance du nationalisme casamançais". Le Sénégal Contemporain (in French). Paris.
- Jacques Foulquier (1966). Les Français en Casamance, de 1826 à 1854 (in French). Dakar, Université de Dakar: Faculté des Lettres de Dakar.
- Philippe Gloaguen (2004). Sénégal et Gambie (in French). Hachette. ISBN 978-2-01-240134-1.
- Emma Gregg; Richard Trillo (2003). The Rough Guide to the Gambia. Rough Guides. ISBN 978-1-84353-083-1.
- Greenaway, Theresa; Bailey, Jill; Chinery, Michael; Penny, Malcolm; Linley, Mike; Steele, Philip; Oxlade, Chris; Preston-Mafham, Ken; Preston-Mafham, Rod; Oliver, Clare; Birchfield, Don (2002). Johnson, Rolf E.; Kraucunas, Nathan E (eds.). Rain Forests of the World. Tarrytown, New York: Marshall Cavendish Corporation. ISBN 978-0-7614-7254-4.
- Martin Allen Klein (1998). Slavery and colonial rule in French West Africa. Cambridge: Cambridge University Press. ISBN 978-0-521-59678-7.
- Olga F. Linares (2007) [1992]. Power, Prayer and Production: The Jola of Casamance, Senegal. Cambridge: Cambridge University Press. ISBN 978-0-521-04035-8.
- Alfred Marche (1879). Trois voyages dans l'Afrique occidentale: Sénégal, Gambie, Casamance, Gabon, Ogooué (in French). Paris: Hachette. OCLC 19175194.
- Claude Marius (1976). "Effets de la sécheresse sur l'évolution des sols de mangroves – Casamance – Gambie". Bulletin de l'IFAN (in French). 41.
- Peter Mark (1985). A Cultural, Economic and Religious History of the Basse Casamance since 1500. Wiesbaden: Franz Steiner Verlag. ISBN 978-3-515-04355-7.
- Peter Mark (1996). ""Portuguese" Architecture and Luso-African Identity in Senegambia and Guinea, 1730-1890". History in Africa. 23: 179–196. doi:10.2307/3171940. JSTOR 3171940.
- Peter Mark (2002). "Portuguese" Style and Luso-African Identity: Precolonial Senegambia, Sixteenth-Nineteenth Centuries. Bloomington, Indiana: Indiana University Press. ISBN 978-0-253-21552-9.
- Negocios externos: documentos apresentados ás Cortes na sessão legislativa de 1887 pelo ministro e secretario d'estado dos negocios estrangeiros (in Portuguese). Lisbonne: Imprensa Nacional. 1887.
- Paolo Palmeri (1995). Retour dans un village diola de Casamance. Chronique d'une recherche anthropologique au Sénégal (in French). Paris: L'Harmattan. ISBN 978-2-7384-3616-0.
- Frank Petit (2003). La part de l'autre: une aventure humaine en terre Diola: à partir d'une expérience humanitaire entre 1994 et 1996, à l'embouchure de la Casamance, Sénégal, sur l'île de Carabane (in French). Université de Lille.
- Dominique Auzias; Jean-Paul Labourdette (2008–2009). Petit Futé Sénégal (in French). Paris: Nouvelles éditions de l'Université. ISBN 978-2-7469-2280-8.
- Christian Roche (2000). Histoire de la Casamance: Conquête et résistance 1850–1920 (in French). Université de Paris I: Karthala. ISBN 978-2-86537-125-9.
- Mathieu Ropitault (November–December 2007). "Les secrets de Karabane". Teranga (in French).
- Pascal Sagna (2007). "Caractéristiques climatiques". Atlas du Sénégal (in French). Paris: Éditions Jaguar. ISBN 978-2-86950-414-1.
- Yves-Jean Saint-Martin (1989). Le Sénégal sous le second Empire. Naissance d'un empire colonial (1850–1871) (in French). Paris: Karthala. ISBN 978-2-86537-201-0.
- Marguerite Schelechten (1988). Tourisme balnéaire ou tourisme rural intégré ? deux modèles de développement sénégalais (in French). Éditions universitaires. ISBN 978-2-8271-0393-5.
- Muriel Scibilia (1986). La Casamance ouvre ses cases. Tourisme au Sénégal (in French). Paris: L'Harmattan. ISBN 978-2-85802-676-0.
- Ibrahima Thioub (1997). "Les écoles pénitentiaires du Sénégal à l'époque coloniale". Cahier de Marjuvia (in French) (4): 73–74.
- Louis-Vincent Thomas (1958). Les Diola. Essai d'analyse fonctionnelle sur une population de basse-Casamance (in French). Dakar: IFAN-Université de Dakar.
- Louis-Vincent Thomas (April 1964). "Faut-il sauver Karabane ?". Notes Africaines (in French) (102): 13–46.
- Louis-Vincent Thomas (July 1956). "Onomatologie et toponymie en pays diola". Notes Africaines (in French) (71).
- Louis-Vincent Thomas (April 1965). "Mouvements de population et dépendance sociologique en Basse-Casamance (Région de Karabane)". Notes Africaines (in French) (106): 42–47.
- Louis-Vincent Thomas (January 1970). "Nouvel exemple d'oralité négro-africaine. Récits Narang-Djiragon, Diola-Karaban et Dyiwat (basse-Casamance)". Bulletin de l'IFAN (in French) (1): 230–309.
- Jordi Tomàs i Guilera (2005). "La identitat ètnica entre els joola d'Oussouye (Húluf, Bubajum áai)" (PDF). Tesis Doctorals en Xarxal (in Catalan). Universitat Autònoma de Barcelona. Archived from the original (PDF) on July 16, 2011.
- Amiral Vallon (20 April 1862). "La Casamance, dépendance du Sénégal". Revue Maritime et Coloniale. 9 (in French). 6: 456–474.
