= Emmanuel Bertrand-Bocandé =

Emmanuel Bertrand-Bocandé (1812–1881) was an explorer, businessman, and French colonial administrator who helped spread French influence in Basse Casamance, Senegal, specifically on the island of Carabane. He left a valuable account of the French perspective on this region during colonial times.

== Biography ==
The son of René Bertrand and Olive Bocandé, Emmanuel Bertrand-Bocandé was born in Nantes on July 3, 1812.

He had control of Carabane from 1849 to 1857. He was replaced by Bourdeny.

He died in Paris on November 28, 1881.

== Works ==
- "Notes sur la Guinée portugaise ou Sénégambie méridionale". Bulletin de la Société de géographie.
  - (in French) First part: Vol. 11, May–June 1849, p. 265–350. Read online at Gallica
  - (in French) Second part: Vol. 12, July–August 1849, p. 57–93. Read online at Gallica
- "Extrait d'une lettre de M. Bertrand Bocandé, résident français à Karabanne (Cazamance) à M. Ferdinand-Denis le 2 février 1851". Bulletin de la Société de géographie (in French). 2: 414–418. 1851.
- "Carabane et Sedhiou. Des ressources que présentent dans leur état actuel les comptoirs français établis sur les bords de la Casamance". Revue coloniale (in French). XVI: 398–421. July–December 1856.

== See also ==
=== Bibliography ===
- Bertrand-Bocandé, Jean; Debien, Gabriel; Saint-Martin, Yves J. (January 1969). "Emmanuel Bertrand-Bocandé (1812–1881): un Nantais en Casamance". Bulletin de l'Institut fondamental d'Afrique noire. B: Sciences humaines (in French). XXXI (1). Dakar: IFAN: 279–308.
- Roche, Christian (1985). Histoire de la Casamance: Conquête et Résistance (in French) (2d ed.). Paris: Éditions Karthala. pp. 82–84 & 99–102. ISBN 2-86537-125-5.
