= Itou, Senegal =

Coordinates: 12.615547°N 16.690292°W

Itou (French: Hitou) is a settled point on the north bank of the Casamance River mouth in southern Senegal. As the first place on the Casamance at which the flag of colonial France was raised in 1828, it became instrumental in the growth of the slave trade and other commerce on that river system.
