= Diogue =

Village and island in Ziguinchor Region, Senegal

Diogué
- Location within Senegal

Geography
- Coordinates: 12°34′28″N 16°45′09″W

Administration
- Senegal
- Region: Ziguichor
- Department: Bignona
- Arrondissement: Kataba

Demographics
- Population: 563 (2003)

Diogué is a village and an island in the rural community of Kafountine, Kataba Arrondissement, Bignona Department, Ziguinchor Region, Senegal. In 2003, there were 563 people and 78 households in Diogué.
