= List of Labour parties =

The name "Labour Party" (or "Labor Party") is used by political parties around the world, particularly in Commonwealth nations. Historically, these parties are associated with democratic socialism, although not exclusively. Over time, most have evolved into social democratic parties. They are traditionally allied with trade unions and the broader labour movement. Many Labour parties are also members of the Socialist International or participants in the Progressive Alliance.

== Active Labour parties ==
Nation or territory	Party
Algeria	Workers' Party
Angola	People's Movement for the Liberation of Angola – Labour Party
Antigua and Barbuda	Antigua Labour Party
Armenia	All Armenian Labour Party; United Labour Party
Australia	Australian Labor Party
Barbados	Barbados Labour Party; Democratic Labour Party
Belarus	Belarusian Labour Party
Bermuda	Progressive Labour Party
Bougainville	Bougainville Labour Party
Brazil	Brazilian Labour Renewal Party
Brazil	Democratic Labour Party
Burundi	Independent Labor Party
Congo	Congolese Party of Labour
Croatia	Croatian Labourists – Labour Party
Curaçao	Labour Party People's Crusade
Dominica	Dominica Labour Party
Fiji	Fiji Labour Party
Georgia	Georgian Labour Party
Gibraltar	Gibraltar Socialist Labour Party
Grenada	Grenada United Labor Party
Hong Kong	Labour Party
Indonesia	Labour Party
Iran	Labour House
Iran	Islamic Labour Party
Iran	Labour Party of Iran (banned/exiled)
Iran	Islamic Association of Workers
Iran	Islamic Labour Welfare Party
Ireland	Labour Party
Isle of Man	Manx Labour Party
Jamaica	Jamaica Labour Party
Liberia	Labor Party of Liberia
Lithuania	Labour Party
Malta	Labour Party
Mauritius	Labour Party
Mexico	Labor Party
Morocco	Labour Party
Netherlands	Labour Party
New Caledonia	Labour Party
New Zealand	New Zealand Labour Party
Nigeria	Labour Party
Norway	Labour Party
Northern Ireland	Social Democratic and Labour Party
Papua New Guinea	Labour Party; People's Labour Party
Poland	Polish Labour Party
Portugal	Portuguese Labour Party
Saint Kitts and Nevis	Saint Kitts and Nevis Labour Party
Saint Kitts and Nevis	People's Labour Party
Saint Lucia	Saint Lucia Labour Party
Saint Vincent and the Grenadines	Unity Labour Party
Scotland	Scottish Labour Party
Solomon Islands	Solomon Islands Labour Party
South Africa	New Labour Party
South Korea	Labor Party
Suriname	Surinamese Labour Party
Sweden	Swedish Social Democratic Labour Party
Switzerland	Swiss Labour Party
Tanzania	Tanzania Labour Party
Republic of China (Taiwan)	Labor Party
Turkey	Labour Party
United Kingdom	Labour Party; Socialist Labour Party; Labour and Co-operative Party
United States	Minnesota Democratic–Farmer–Labor Party
Vanuatu	Labour Party
Wales	Welsh Labour Party
Zimbabwe	Zimbabwe Labour Party

== Historical Labour parties ==
Nation	Party
Albania	Party of Labour of Albania
Australia	Socialist Labor Party; Industrial Socialist Labor Party; United Labour Party (S.A., 1891–1917) see ALP history
Brazil	Agrarian Socialist and Labour Renewal Party 1985–1990; Brazilian Labour Party 1945–1964; Brazilian Labour Party 1981–2023; Brazilian Renewal Labour Party 1993–1995; Christian Labour Party (former name of Agir); Comunitary Labour Party 1992; Labour Party of Brazil (former name of Avante); National Labour Party 1945–1965; Orienting Labour Party 1945–1961; Reformer Labour Party 1985–1986; Renewal Labour Movement 1959–1965; Renewal Labour Party 1985–1993; Republican Labour Party 1948–1965; Social Labour Party 1946–1965; Social Labour Party 1996–2003
Belgium	Belgian Labour Party
Burkina Faso	Party of Labour of Burkina; Voltaic Labour Party 1970
Canada	Canadian Labour Party 1917-1929; Labour Party of Canada 1870s-1960s Co-operative Commonwealth Federation - (Farmer-Labour-Socialist) 1932-1961; Labor-Progressive Party; North American Labour Party
Croatia	Croatian Labour Party, 1906-1918
Gibraltar	Gibraltar Labour Party
Greece	Socialist Labour Party of Greece
Greenland	Labour Party
Guatemala	Guatemalan Party of Labour – Alamos
India	Independent Labour Party; Labour Kisan Party of Hindustan
Indonesia	Labour Party (1949); Labour Party of Indonesia; Labour Party (1998)
Israel	Israeli Labor Party
Italy	Labour Federation
Jamaica	National Labour Party
Lithuania	Democratic Labour Party of Lithuania
Malaya	Labour Party
Namibia	Labour Party
Netherlands	Central Democratic Labour Party
New Zealand	Labour Party (original); United Labour Party; Democratic Labour Party; NewLabour Party
Nova Scotia	Cape Breton Labour Party 1970-1984
Panama	Labour Party
Puerto Rico	Labor Party
Samoa	Western Samoa Labour Party
Senegal	Labour Party of Sine Saloum
Singapore	Labour Party
Slovakia	Labour Party
South Africa	Labour Party; Labour Party (Coloured)
South Korea	Democratic Labor Party
Trinidad and Tobago	Trinidad Labour Party; Democratic Labour Party; United Labour Front; Social Democratic Labour Party of Trinidad and Tobago; Caribbean National Labour Party
United Kingdom	Communist Labour Party (Scotland); Independent Labour Party; National Labour; Belfast Labour Party; Labour Party of Northern Ireland; Labour Party of Scotland (former name of Scottish branch of Labour Party (UK)); Northern Ireland Labour Party; Republican Labour Party (In Northern Ireland); Scottish Labour Party (1888-1895); Scottish Labour Party (1976-1981)
United States	Labor Party (United States, 19th century); Union Labor Party (California); Socialist Labor Party of America; Farmer–Labor Party (United States); Minnesota Farmer-Labor Party; Labor Party of the United States; American Labor Party; American Labor Party (1932); U.S. Labor Party; Labor Party (United States, 1996); Communist Labor Party of North America; Revolutionary Socialist Labor Party; United States Socialist-Labor Party; Greenback-Labor Party

== See also ==
- Labour Party (disambiguation)
- Communist party
  - List of communist parties
- Democratic Socialist Party (disambiguation)
- Labour government (disambiguation)
- Labour movement
- List of left-wing political parties
- Social Democratic Party
  - List of social democratic parties
- Socialist Labour Party (disambiguation)
- Socialist Party
- Socialist Workers Party (disambiguation)
- Workers' Party
