= Labour Party =

Labour Party or Labor Party is a name used by many political parties. These political parties are generally left-wing or centre-left, usually with nominal commitments to social democracy or democratic socialism.

Political parties by this name include:

== Africa ==
=== Burkina Faso ===
- Party of Labour of Burkina, active 1990–1996
- Voltaic Labour Party, active c. 1970

=== South Africa ===
- Labour Party (South Africa)
- Labour Party (South Africa, 1969)
- Labour Party (South Africa, 2024)
- Natal Labour Party
- New Labour Party (South Africa)
- Transvaal Independent Labour Party

=== Elsewhere in Africa ===
- MPLA, formerly known as the Popular Movement for the Liberation of Angola – Labour Party
- Independent Labor Party, Burundi
- Congolese Party of Labour, Republic of the Congo
- Labor Party of Liberia
- Labour Party (Mauritius), one of the two major parties in Mauritius
- Labour Party (Morocco)
- South West African Labour Party, Namibia, active circa 1970s
- Labour Party (Nigeria)
- Labour Party of Sine Saloum, Senegal, active circa 1960
- Tanzania Labour Party
- Zimbabwe Labour Party

== Asia ==
=== Armenia ===
- All Armenian Labour Party
- United Labour Party (Armenia)

=== India ===
- Labour Party (India)
- Independent Labour Party (India), active circa 1936–1938
- Labour Kisan Party of Hindustan, active 1923–1925

=== Indonesia ===
- Labour Party of Indonesia, active 1945–1948
- Labour Party (Indonesia, 1949), active 1949–1955
- Labour Party (Indonesia, 1998) active 1998–2021
- Labour Party (Indonesia, 2021)

=== Japan ===
- Japan Labour-Farmer Party, active 1926–1928
- Farmer-Labour Party, active 1925

=== Korea ===
- Labor Party (South Korea)
- Democratic Labor Party (South Korea)

=== Philippines ===
- Partido ng Manggagawa
- Partido ng Manggagawa at Magsasaka

=== Singapore ===
- Labour Front
- Labour Party (Singapore)

=== Elsewhere in Asia ===
- Georgian Labour Party
- Labour Party (Hong Kong)
- Israeli Labor Party
- Labour Party of Malaya, active 1952–1969
- Labour Party Pakistan
- Ceylon Labour Party, Sri Lanka
- Labor Party (Taiwan)
- Labour Party (Thailand)
- Labour Party (Turkey)

== Europe ==
=== Croatia ===
- Croatian Labourists – Labour Party
- Croatian Labour Party

=== Italy ===
- Labour Federation (Italy), active 1994–1998
- Labour Party (Italy), active since 2012

=== Lithuania ===
- Labour Party (Lithuania)
- Democratic Labour Party of Lithuania, active 1989–2001

=== Netherlands ===
- Labour Party (Netherlands)
- Central Democratic Labour Party, active 1933

=== Norway ===
- Labour Party (Norway)
- Social Democratic Labour Party of Norway, active circa 1920s

=== Poland ===
- Labour Union (Poland)
- Polish Labour Party-August 80, active 2001–2017
- Labour Faction (1937), active 1937–1946
- Labor Party (Partia Pracy), active 1925–1930
- Labour Faction (1989), active 1989–2005

=== Ukraine ===
- Labour Party Ukraine
- Labour Ukraine

=== United Kingdom and its territories ===
==== Great Britain and Northern Ireland ====
===== Active =====
- Labour Party (UK), one of two main political parties in the UK, primarily active in Great Britain
  - Scottish Labour Party, division of the party for Scotland
  - Welsh Labour, division of the party for Wales
  - London Labour, division of the party for London
  - Labour Party in Northern Ireland, the unregistered division of the party for Northern Ireland
- Labour – Federation of Labour Groups, Northern Ireland
- Newtownabbey Labour Party, Northern Ireland
- Social Democratic and Labour Party, Northern Ireland
- Socialist Labour Party (UK)

===== Defunct =====
- Belfast Labour Party, Northern Ireland
- Communist Labour Party (Scotland)
- Democratic Labour Party (UK, 1972)
- Democratic Labour Party (UK, 1998), a minor party in Walsall, England
- Independent Labour Party
- Irish Labour Party in Northern Ireland
- Labour Party of Northern Ireland
- National Labour Organisation
- Northern Ireland Labour Party
- Republican Labour Party, Northern Ireland
- Scottish Labour Party (1888)

==== UK territories ====
- Gibraltar Socialist Labour Party
- Gibraltar Labour Party, active 2003–2005
- Manx Labour Party

=== Elsewhere in Europe ===
- Belarusian Labour Party
- Belgian Labour Party, active 1885–1940
- Estonian Labour Party, active 1917–1932
- Georgian Labour Party
- Labour Party (Ireland)
- Workers' Party (Latvia), active 1920–1923 and 1997–2008
- Labour Party (Malta)
- Labour Party (Moldova)
- Labor Party (Romania)
- Labour Party (Slovakia)
- Swiss Party of Labour
- Labour Party (Turkey)
- Volkssozialistische Bewegung Deutschlands/Partei der Arbeit (People's Socialist Movement of Germany/Labour Party), a neo-Nazi Strasserite party active in West Germany 1971–1982

== North America ==
=== Barbados ===
- Barbados Labour Party
- Democratic Labour Party (Barbados)

=== Canada ===
- Canadian Labour Party, active 1917–1929
- Labour candidates and parties in Canada, active 1870s–1960s
- Co-operative Commonwealth Federation (Farmer-Labour-Socialist), active 1932–1961
- Labor-Progressive Party, the legal political organization of the Communist Party of Canada active 1943–1959
- North American Labour Party, an unregistered party active circa 1970s
- Cape Breton Labour Party, active 1970–1984

=== Guatemala ===
- Guatemalan Party of Labour
- Guatemalan Party of Labour – Alamos, an underground communist party active circa 1980s
- Guatemalan Party of Labour – Communist Party, an underground communist party active 1979–1983

=== Jamaica ===
- Jamaica Labour Party
- National Labour Party (Jamaica), active circa 1950s and 1960s

=== Trinidad and Tobago ===
- Trinidad Labour Party
- Democratic Labour Party (Trinidad and Tobago)
- United Labour Front
- Social Democratic Labour Party of Trinidad and Tobago
- Caribbean National Labour Party

=== United States and its territories ===
==== Active ====
- Socialist Labor Party of America, established 1876

==== Defunct ====
- American Labor Party, 1936–1956
- American Labor Party (1932), active until 1935
- Communist Labor Party of North America, 1953–1974
- Farmer–Labor Party, 1918–1944
- Greenback Labor Party, active 1874–1889
- Labor Party (Hawaii), 1908
- Labor Party (Puerto Rico), active 1899–1915
- Labor Party (United States, 19th century), several parties
- Labor Party of the United States, active circa 1919
- Minnesota Farmer–Labor Party, 1918–1944
  - Merged into the current-day Minnesota Democratic–Farmer–Labor Party
- Revolutionary Socialist Labor Party
- Union Labor Party (California), active 1901–1912
- U.S. Labor Party, a short-lived LaRouchite political party active circa 1970s
- Labor Party (United States, 1996), 1996-2007

=== Elsewhere in North America ===
- Antigua and Barbuda Labour Party
- Labour Party (Bahamas)
- Progressive Labour Party (Bermuda)
- Labour Party People's Crusade, Curaçao
- Dominica Labour Party
- Labour Party (Greenland), active 1979–1983
- Grenada United Labour Party
- Labor Party (Mexico)
- Labor Party (Panama), active 1925–1930
- Saint Kitts and Nevis Labour Party
- Saint Lucia Labour Party
- Unity Labour Party, Saint Vincent and the Grenadines

== Oceania ==
=== Australia ===
- Australian Labor Party
  - ACT Labor Party
  - New South Wales Labor Party
  - Queensland Labor Party
  - South Australian Labor Party
  - Tasmanian Labor Party
  - Territory Labor Party
  - Victorian Labor Party
  - Western Australian Labor Party
- Democratic Labour Party (Australia, 1980)
- Democratic Labour Party (historical)
- Progressive Labour Party (Australia), active 1996 to 2021
- Industrial Socialist Labor Party, active late-1910s and early 1920s

=== New Zealand ===
- New Zealand Labour Party
- New Zealand Labour Party (1910), active 1910–1912
- United Labour Party (New Zealand), active 1912–1916
- Democratic Labour Party (New Zealand), active circa 1940s
- NewLabour Party, active 1989–2000

=== Papua New Guinea ===
- Bougainville Labour Party
- PNG Labour Party
- People's Labour Party (Papua New Guinea)

=== Solomon Islands ===
- Solomon Islands Labour Party
- Labour Party (Solomon Islands), active 1970–1971

=== Elsewhere in Oceania ===
- Fiji Labour Party
- Labour Party (New Caledonia)
- Western Samoa Labour Party, active circa 1990s
- Vanuatu Labour Party

== South America ==
=== Brazil ===
- Brazilian Labour Party (historical), 1945–1965
- Democratic Labour Party (Brazil), since 1979
- Brazilian Labour Party (current), since 1979
- Brazilian Labour Renewal Party, since 1994
- Avante (political party), since 2017, Labour Party of Brazil, 1989–2017
- National Labour Party (1945-1965)
- Podemos (Brazil), since 2016, National Labour Party, 1995–2016
- Act (Brazil), since 2021, Christian Labour Party, 2000–2021
- Renovator Labour Party, 1985–1993
- Social Labour Party, 1947–1965
- Orienting Labour Party, 1945–1951

=== Guyana ===
- British Guiana Labour Party, active 1946–1950
- Guyana Labour Party, active circa 1990s

=== Elsewhere in South America ===
- Labour Party (Argentina)
- Labor Party (Panama), active 1925–1930
- Surinamese Labour Party

== See also ==
- Labour government (disambiguation), a list of several Labour governments
- List of Labour parties
- Labour Party leadership election (disambiguation)
- Party of Labour (disambiguation)
- Workers' Party (disambiguation)
