= Guinean mangroves =

Coastal tidal mangrove swamp ecoregion on West African coast

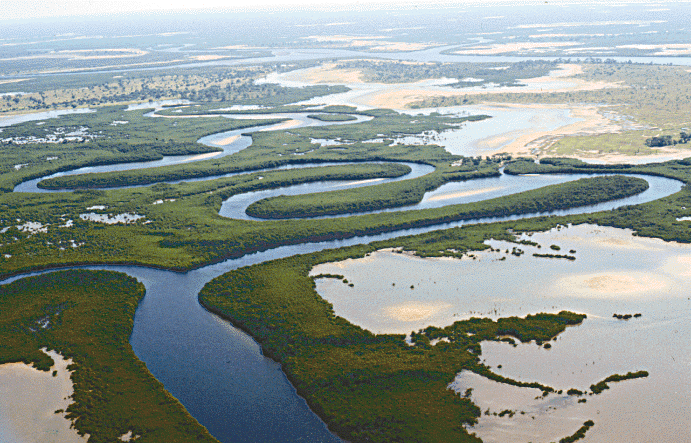
- mangroves in the Sine-Saloum Delta, Senegal

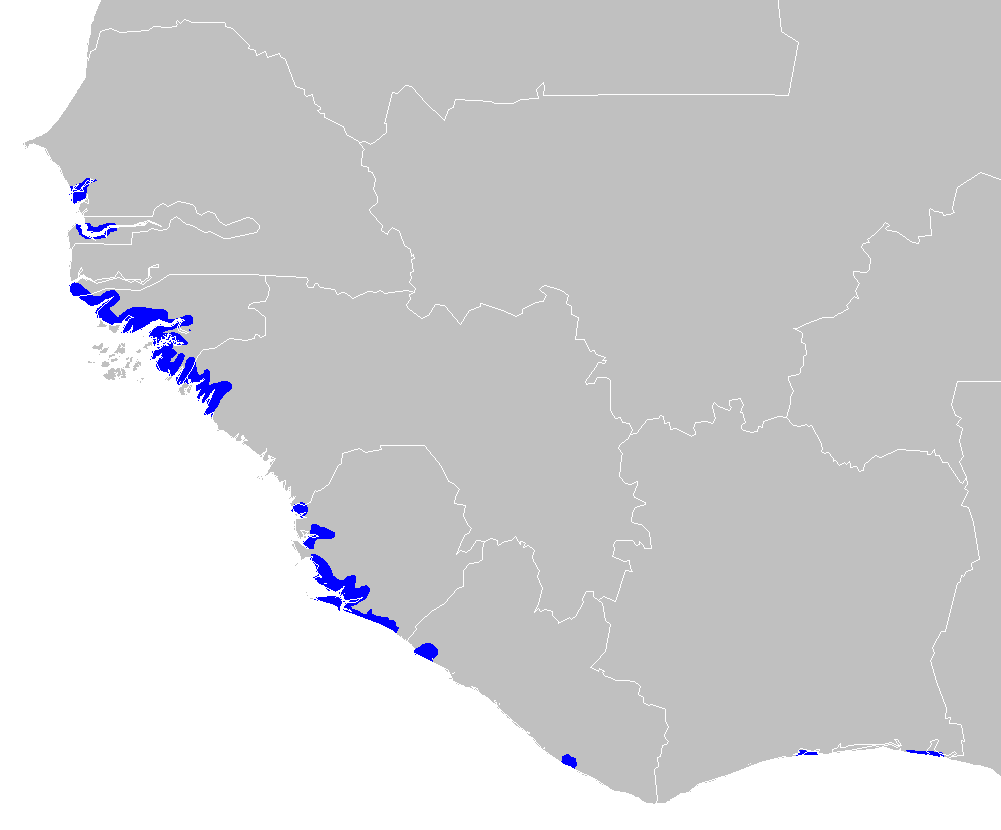
- Map of the Guinean mangroves

Ecology
- Realm: Afrotropical
- Biome: mangrove
- Borders: Eastern Guinean forests; Guinean forest-savanna mosaic, Western Guinean lowland forests

Geography
- Area: 22,165 km^{2} (8,558 mi^{2})
- Countries: List: Gambia; Guinea; Guinea-Bissau; Liberia; Senegal; Sierra Leone

Conservation
- Conservation status: Vulnerable
- Protected: 5,289 km^{2} (24%)

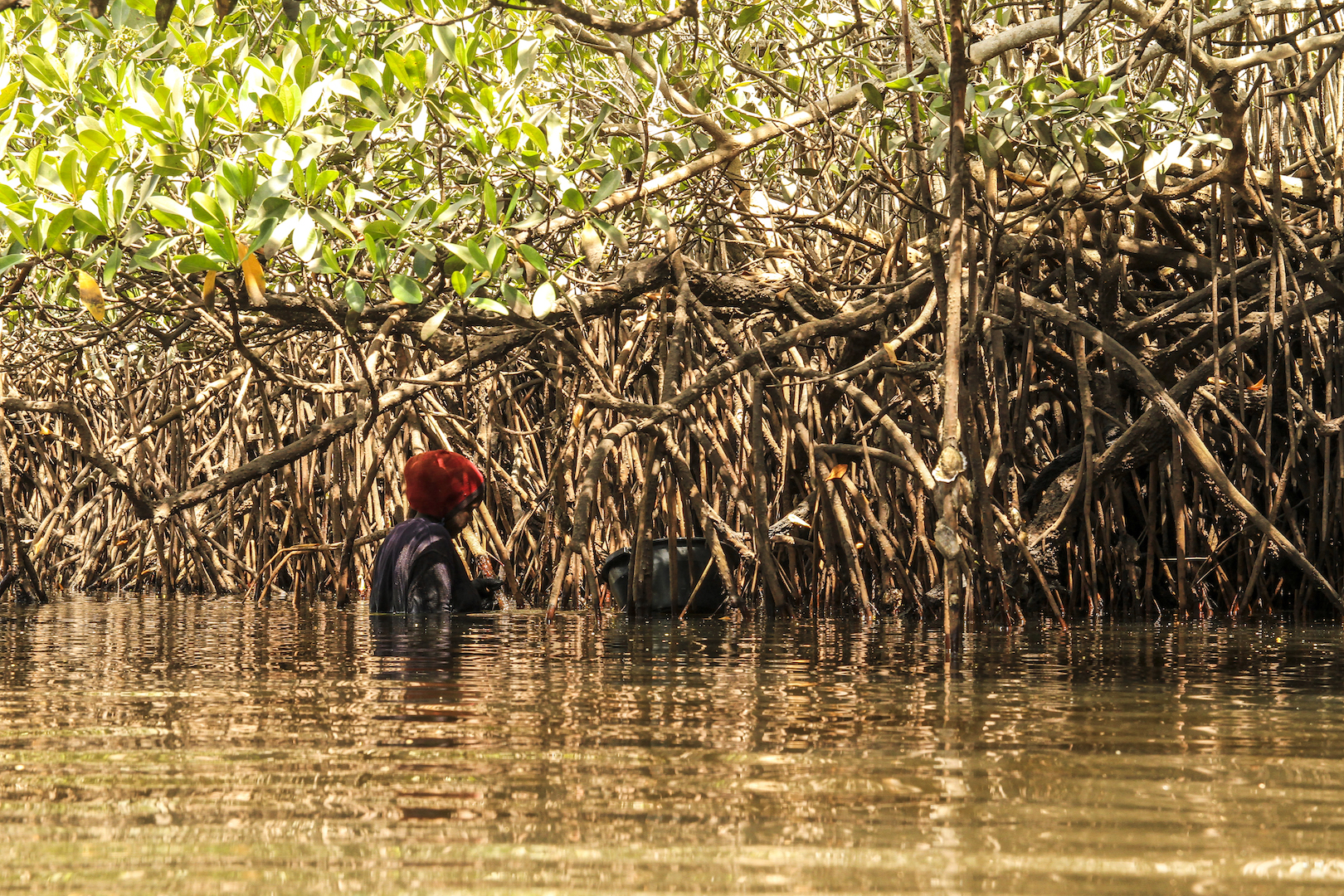
gathering oysters in the Sine-Saloum mangroves, Senegal.

The Guinean mangroves (French: Mangroves guinéennes, Portuguese: Mangais guineenses) are a coastal ecoregion of mangrove swamps in rivers and estuaries near the ocean of West Africa from Senegal to Sierra Leone.

== Location and description ==
Guinean mangroves can be found: in the Saloum River and Casamance deltas in Senegal; in the lower Gambia River basin; much of the coast of Guinea-Bissau, including the Cacheu and Mansoa Rivers; across the border in northern Guinea; and much of the coast of Sierra Leone including the Sherbro River. Mangroves thrive on flat coastal inlets and estuaries where the ocean tides wash warm salt water high upriver, in this ecoregion as far as 100 km, for example in the Cacheu River of Guinea-Bissau.

== Flora ==
The mangroves have a varied composition with Rhizophora, Laguncularia racemosa and Conocarpus erectus growing up to 10m tall among larger areas of Rhizophora and Avicennia. The tallest trees may be 40 m (130 ft) and form the equivalent of gallery forests along the creeks, the mudflats between the creeks having much shorter trees. The inland fringes of the forest are clad in grasses, ferns and salt-loving plants. However, the flora in the ecoregion is not as biodiverse as that of East African mangrove forests.

== Fauna ==
Mangrove swamps are important feeding grounds for fish, birds and other animals. Marine wildlife includes oysters and shrimps. Mammals found here include the African manatee. Birds in these wet habitats include Goliath heron, purple heron, cattle egret, striated heron, western reef heron, greater flamingo, lesser flamingo, African spoonbill, and African sacred ibis. The forests also provide important habitat for migratory birds.

== Threats and preservation ==
Mangrove habitats are under threat as trees are cut down for timber and firewood or to clear land for agriculture including rice farming. This habitat is also under threat from the lower amounts of precipitation in the region over the last few decades. In southern Senegal, efforts are being made to replant the mangroves. Urban areas near the mangroves include the Gambian capital, Banjul and the Guinea-Bissau capital Bissau. National parks in the region include Saloum Delta National Park and Basse Casamance National Park in Senegal, Niumi National Park in Gambia, and Tarafes de Cacheu Natural Park in Guinea-Bissau. The Saloum river delta can also be accessed from the village of Foundiougne in Senegal.
