= National Labour Party =

National Labour Party can refer to:

== Czechoslovakia ==
- National Labour Party (Czechoslovakia, 1925)
- National Labour Party (Czechoslovakia, 1938)

== United Kingdom ==
- National Labour Organisation (UK, 1931–47)
- National Labour Party (UK, 1957)
- Labour Electoral Association, sometimes known as the National Labour Party from 1887 onwards
- Labour Party (UK)

== Elsewhere ==
- National Labor Party (Australia)
- National Labor Party (Queensland, Australia)
- National Labour Party (Benin)
- National Labor Party, former name of Podemos (Brazil)
- National Labour Party (Brazil, 1945–1965)
- National Party of Work (Hungary)
- National Labour Party (Ireland)
- National Labour Party (Jamaica)
- National Labour Party (Kenya)
- National Labour Party, former name of HUN Party in Mongolia

== See also ==
- List of political parties by name
- National Party (disambiguation)
- Labour Party (disambiguation)
- Democratic Labour Party (disambiguation)
