= Nianing =

- Location within Senegal
- Coordinates: 14°21′0″N 16°56′0″W
- Country: Senegal
- Region: Thiès
- Department: M'bour
- Elevation: 8 m (26 ft)

Population
  - Total: 6,448

Nianing is a city in Petite Côte, Senegal, south of Dakar, 8 kilometres (5.0 mi) from M'Bour.

== History ==
Nianing was once a major trading post for cotton and peanuts.

Today, the city is situated on the main road that leads from M'Bour to Joal-Fadiouth.

== Administration ==
Nianing is part of the rural community of Malicounda in M'bour Department, Thiès.

== Geography ==
The nearest towns are Saly, M'Bour, Warang, Gagnabougou, Pointe-Sarène, Ponto, and Nianing Boro

== Population ==
According to PEPAM (Water and Sanitation Program for the Millennium), there are 6448 people and 736 households in Nianing.

The population is predominantly Serer, mostly Catholic.

== Economy ==
Fish constitute the primary natural resource in the area. The local economy also relies on livestock, agriculture, trade, and, recently, tourism.

== See also ==
- Tourism in Senegal
- Epiphany of the Lord Church of Nianing

== Bibliography ==
- Kamal El Jack. Un Centre de formation agricole : le cas de Nianing au Sénégal (in French).
- Brigitte Rasoloniaina (2000). Étude des représentations linguistiques des Sereer (Sénégal : Mbour, Nianing, Sandiara) (in French). Paris: L'Harmattan.
- Marguerite Schelechten (1988). Tourisme balnéaire ou tourisme rural intégré ? deux modèles de développement sénégalais (in French). Éditions universitaires. p. 442. ISBN 2-8271-0393-1.
