= List of islands of Senegal =

This is a list of islands of Senegal.

== Islands ==
Name	Alternative names	Coordinates	Notes
Île de Barbagueye	Baba-Gueye Island, Ile de Babagueye	15°58′N 17°30′W	
Betanti		13°41′N 17°23′W	
Bird Island		13°38′N 17°20′W	Sine-Saloum, near Mar Lodj
Îlots de Bitch		13°55′N 17°15′W	
Îles aux Boeufs		13°40′N 17°21′W	Sine-Saloum
Carabane	Karabane	12°31′N 17°16′W	Historic island in the mouth of the Casamance River
Devil's Island		12°43′N 16°26′W	
Îles du Diable		13°58′N 17°21′W	
Île de Diakal	Île aux Caimans	16°31′N 17°49′W	
Île de Diamanio		13°40′N 17°20′W	
Diogue	Jogue Island	12°34′N 16°45′W	
Diouk		16°1′N 17°31′W	
Fadiouth		14°9′N 17°10′W	Part of the town of Joal-Fadiouth
Île de la Goélette	Île de Tine Dine	12°39′N 17°13′W	
Gorée		14°40′N 18°36′W	The island of slaves opposite the port of Dakar
Guior Island		13°49′N 17°18′W	
Guissanor	Île de Guisanor	13°57′N 17°16′W	
Île de Kousmar	Île de Tine Dine	14°7′N 17°49′W	
Île Lougne		14°39′N 18°31′W	
Islands of the Madeleine	Snake Island	14°39′N 18°31′W	
Mar Lodj	Mar Lothie, Mar Loytch, Mar Lyotch, Mar Lotche	14°03′N 16°40′W	Sine-Saloum
Île de Marnia	Île de Mar, Île de Soultouk, Île de Diatanou	14°1′N 17°18′W	
Île de Mbill	Bil	13°51′N 17°19′W	
Morfil		16°34′N 15°40′W	On the Sénégal River
Ngor	Île de N'gor	14°45′N 18°29′W	
Niodior		13°52′N 16°44′W	Sine-Saloum (birthplace of Fatou Diome)
N'tieng Island	Île de Tieng	16°18′N 17°37′W	
Îles aux Oiseaux		12°35′N 17°40′W	Casamance
Île Oudioubala		13°55′N 17°19′W	
Île de Poutake	Île de Pontake	13°48′N 17°22′W	Sine-Saloum
Île de Roup		16°3′N 17°31′W	
Safal		15°57′N 17°30′W	
Island of Saint-Louis		16°1′4″N 16°30′1″W	
Île de Sal-Sal	Île de Salsal	16°3′N 17°29′W	
Sohr	Sor	16°0′N 17°31′W	
Yoff	Yof, Teuguene	14°46′N 18°31′W	Opposite the village of Yoff, near Dakar
