= Palmarin =

Palmarin Palmarin Fakao, Palmarin-facao, Nguedj
- Village
- Location within Senegal
- Coordinates: 14°1′0″N 16°46′0″W
- Country: Senegal
- Region: Fatick
- Department: Fatick
- Elevation: 1 m (3.3 ft)

Population (2003)
  - Total: 6,698
- Time zone: UTC±00:00

Palmarin (also called Palmarin Fakao, Palmarin-facao, or Nguedj) is a coastal village in Senegal, located in Sine-Saloum near Sangomar Point between Joal-Fadiouth and Djifer.

== History ==
Palmarin was formerly part of the Kingdom of Sine. Throughout the 19th century, the village participated in the trade of ivory and fur.

== Administration ==
Palmarin is now part of Fatick Department in Fatick Region.

== Geography ==
The nearest towns are Joal-Fadiouth, Ngalou Sessene, Mar Lodj, Mar Souloum, Diakhanor, and Guimsam.

=== Population ===
In 2003, there were 6698 people and 758 households in the rural community of Palmarin.

=== Economy ===
Palmarin's economy is dominated by fishing and agriculture, however tourism also make a contribution, thanks to the beaches, palm trees (which give the village its name), and palm wine.

== Climate ==
Palmarin has a hot semi-arid climate (BSh) with no rainfall from November to May and moderate to heavy rainfall from June to October.

Climate data for Palmarin
Month	Jan	Feb	Mar	Apr	May	Jun	Jul	Aug	Sep	Oct	Nov	Dec	Year
Mean daily maximum °C (°F)	31.7 (89.1)	33.1 (91.6)	34.2 (93.6)	33.9 (93.0)	33.6 (92.5)	33.5 (92.3)	32.0 (89.6)	31.2 (88.2)	31.9 (89.4)	33.4 (92.1)	34.1 (93.4)	31.8 (89.2)	32.9 (91.2)
Daily mean °C (°F)	23.8 (74.8)	24.9 (76.8)	26.1 (79.0)	26.4 (79.5)	27.1 (80.8)	28.2 (82.8)	27.8 (82.0)	27.2 (81.0)	27.6 (81.7)	28.0 (82.4)	27.1 (80.8)	24.3 (75.7)	26.5 (79.8)
Mean daily minimum °C (°F)	15.9 (60.6)	16.7 (62.1)	18.0 (64.4)	19.0 (66.2)	20.6 (69.1)	23.0 (73.4)	23.7 (74.7)	23.3 (73.9)	23.3 (73.9)	22.7 (72.9)	20.1 (68.2)	16.9 (62.4)	20.3 (68.5)
Average rainfall mm (inches)	1 (0.0)	0 (0)	0 (0)	0 (0)	0 (0)	38 (1.5)	135 (5.3)	277 (10.9)	197 (7.8)	49 (1.9)	2 (0.1)	1 (0.0)	700 (27.5)
Source: Climate-Data.org

== See also ==
=== Bibliography ===
- Henri Gravrand (1961). Visage africain de l'Église : une expérience au Sénégal (in French). Paris: Éditions de l'Orante. p. 287.
- Bernard Lacombe (1967). Palmarin : essai de dépouillement de registres paroissiaux en Afrique, Sénégal : méthodologie et exposition des données brutes : rapport de fin de programme, décembre 1965-décembre 1966 (in French). Dakar: IRD.
- Catherine Sabinot (November 2003). "Tortues marines sur le littoral palmarinois (Sénégal) : entre attentes internationales et cultures locales". Actes du 9ème Congrès des étudiants-chercheurs au MNHN (in French). Paris: 54.
