= Democratic Labour Party =

Democratic Labour Party may refer to:

- Democratic Labour Party (Australia, 1978) – spelt Labor until 2013
  - Democratic Labor Party (Australia, 1955) – predecessor to DLP (1955–1978)
- Democratic Labour Party (Barbados)
- Democratic Labour Party (Brazil)
- Democratic Labour Party of Lithuania
- Democratic Labour Party (New Zealand)
- Democratic Labor Party (South Korea)
- Democratic Labor Party (South Korea, 2025), a temporary Justice Party rename for coalition with Green Party and Labor Party for the 2025 South Korean presidential election.
- Democratic Labour Party (Spain), or PTD
- Democratic Labour Party (Trinidad and Tobago), a Trinidadian political party that existed from 1957 to 1971
- Democratic Labour Party (UK, 1972), a UK political party that existed from 1972 to 1980
- Democratic Labour Party (UK, 1998), a UK political party that existed from 1998 to 2016
- West Indies Democratic Labour Party a West Indian political party group that existed from 1958 to 1962
- Minnesota Democratic–Farmer–Labor Party in the United States

== See also ==
- List of political parties by name
- Democratic Party (disambiguation)
- Labour Party (disambiguation)
- National Labour Party (disambiguation)
