= Proletarian Unity Party =

The Proletarian Unity Party is a name which was used by the following political parties:

- Proletarian Unity Party (France)
- Proletarian Unity Party (Italy)

== See also ==
- List of political parties by name
- Labour Party (disambiguation)
