= Point of Sangomar =

Sand spit located on the Atlantic Ocean at the mouth of the Saloum Delta

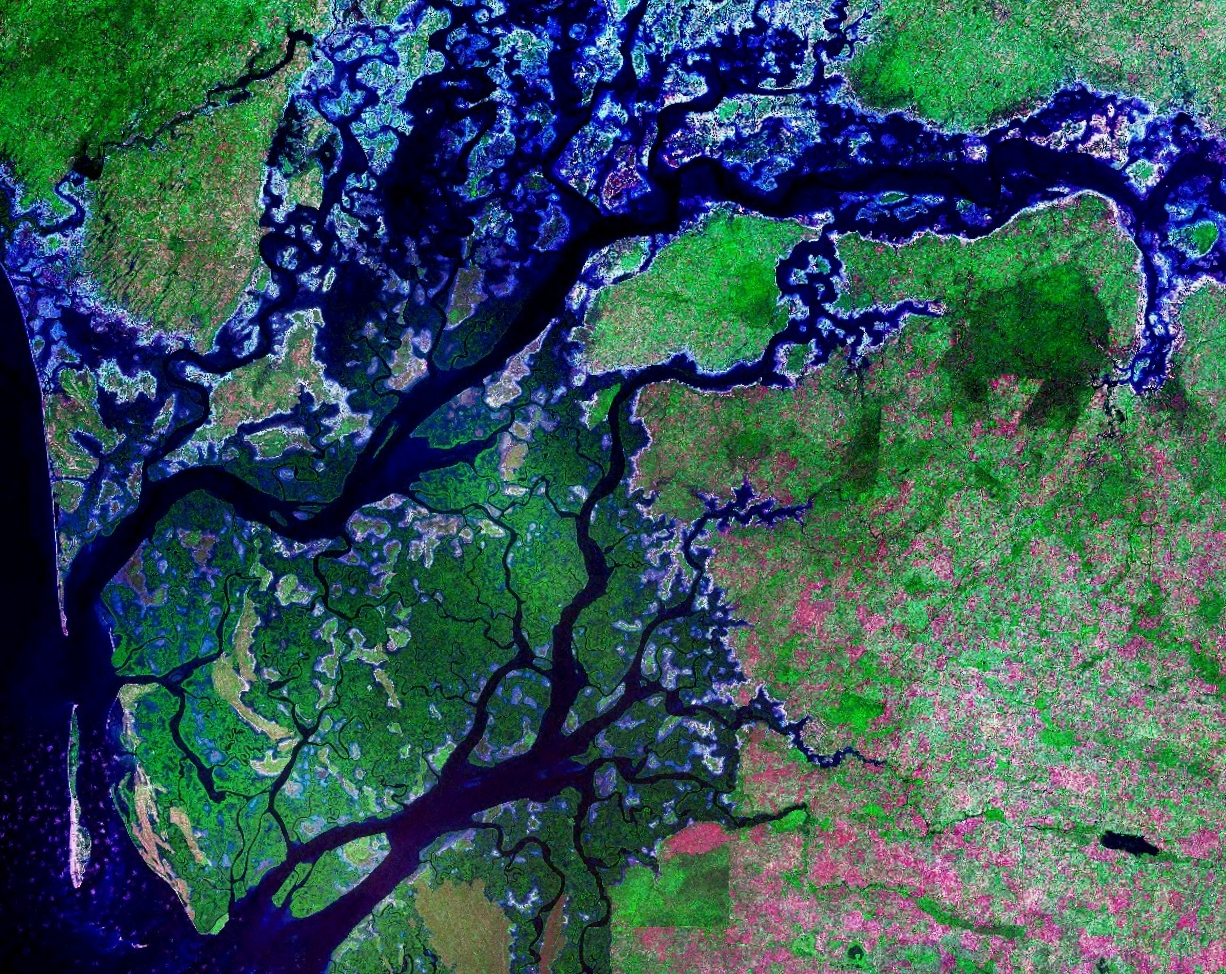
The Point of Sangomar breached left, on a visible image of NASA (2000).

The Point of Sangomar is a sand spit located on the Atlantic Ocean at the mouth of the Saloum Delta, which marks the end of the Petite Côte west of Senegal.

This narrow sandbar extends south about twenty kilometers from Palmarin Diakhanor. Long threatened by coastal erosion, the fragile cord was again broken by a tidal wave in 1987, giving birth to the island of Sangomar. The gap between this new island and the point where the village of Djifer is found continues to widen.

== Geomorphology and environmental ==
The rupture in Sangomar is the result of a natural process for the past few thousand years, which has also been noticed by sailors.

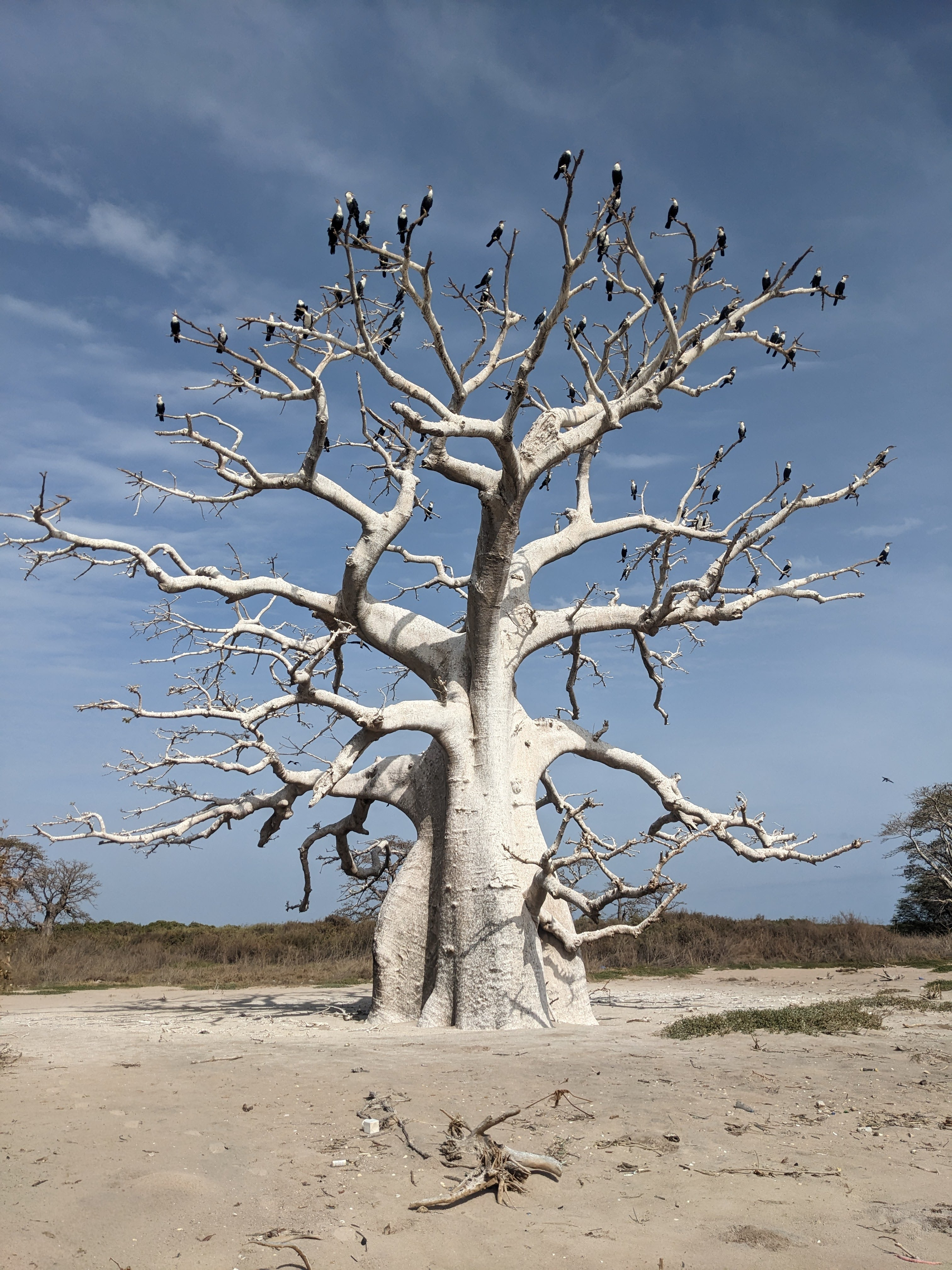
A baobab on Sangomar Island with a flock of cormorants watching the ocean for fish

In 1891, it was found that the gap had widened from 25 to 30m since 1886. In the twentieth century, several breaks were reported including: 1909, 1928, 1960, 1970, etc.

The latest occurred on 27 February 1987 at a place called Lagoba. A year later, the gap was reported to be 1 km wide, and ten years later, about 4 km. Several camps and buildings were destroyed. The fish packing plant at Djifer was closed in 1996. The village located 4 km north of the first breakpoint is increasingly threatened and authorities are considering the evacuation of its inhabitants to the new port of Diakhanor.

Parallel to the phenomenon of erosion occurs a process of sedimentation: the extremity of the new Southern Island of Sangomar increases by 100 m per annum to the south and, on the opposite bank, the outskirts of the villages of Niodior and Dionewar are silting considerably, reducing traffic of vessels and contributing to the isolation of populations.

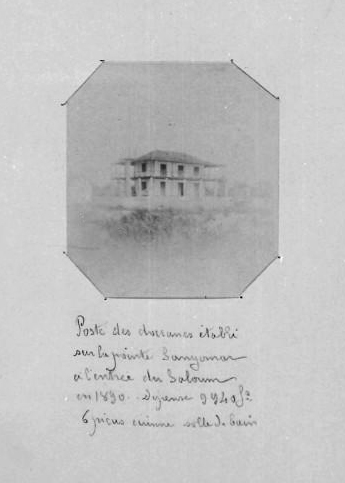
Customs post established on the edge of Sangomar in 1890

All these phenomena are closely followed by a body established with the support of UNESCO in 1984, the multidisciplinary team that studies coastal ecosystems (EPEEC).

== History ==
The Point of Sangomar has also been long described by navigators and hydrographers because of its bar and because of its strategic location downstream of the port of Kaolack, an important production center for peanuts and salt.

In the mid-nineteenth century, Louis Faidherbe, the Governor of Senegal, tried to take control of the peanut producing countries and those encircling the Cayor. In May 1858, he made an expedition directed in particular to the Kingdom of Sine. To consolidate the French position, as in Rufisque (Cayor), Saly (Baol), Kaolack (Saloum) and Joal-Fadiouth (Kingdom of Sine), a fort was built at Sangomar. In 1890, a customs post was built there.

== Toponymy ==
Amongst the Serer people, "Sangomar" mean "the village of shadows" (the "Elysiums") - in Serer proper. In Serer Saafi, sangomar mean shadow.

== Religious significance ==
In the Serer religion, the Point of Sangomar is a place believed to be a gathering place for pangool. The local population continue to visit this island to venerate ancestors. It is a Serer place of worship and one of the most sacred places in Serer religion. Serer and Jola tradition speak of an ancient legend commonly referred to as the legend of Jambooñ and Agaire. According to this legend, two sisters (Jambooñ and Agaire) boarded a pirogue along with their parties. The boat broke in two at the Point of Sangomar. Those who survived and headed north were the ancestors of the Serer people, and those who headed south became the ancestors of the Jola.

"Sangomar, a Serer place of worship, at Palmarin" appears on the List of monuments and historical sites in Senegal.

== Literature ==
President Léopold Sédar Senghor, himself of Serer origin, makes a discreet reference to Sangomar in one of his poems:

"I have given you wildflowers, whose fragrance is mysterious as sorcerer's eyes
And their brilliance has the richness of twilight in Sangomar"

"Pointe de Sangomar" (French for Point of Sangomar) is also the name of the presidential plane, bought in 1978 by President Senghor. Senghor, who has a history of appropriating Serer religious symbols and spiritual references in his works named it that. In April 2012, the Senegalese government opted to sell the aircraft but faced difficulties attracting buyers.

In 2019, Fatou Diome, herself a member of the Serer ethnic group and from the nearby island of Niodior, published a novel titled Les Veilleurs de Sangomar (The Watchers of Sangomar).
