= List of shipwrecks in June 1883 =

The list of shipwrecks in June 1883 includes ships sunk, foundered, grounded, or otherwise lost during June 1883.

== 1 June ==
List of shipwrecks: 1 June 1883
Ship	State	Description
Rossini	United Kingdom	The steamship ran aground on the Dog Rocks, off the coast of Tunisia.

== 2 June ==
List of shipwrecks: 2 June 1883
Ship	State	Description
Goya	Spain	The steamship collided with the steamship Vinuesa (Spain) at Seville and was severely damaged.

== 3 June ==
List of shipwrecks: 3 June 1883
Ship	State	Description
Inga	Norway	The barque collided with the barque Elgin (United Kingdom) in the Atlantic Ocean (49°47′N 11°26′W) and was severely damaged. Inga was on a voyage from Philadelphia, Pennsylvania, United States to Helsingør, Denmark. She was towed in to Falmouth, Cornwall, United Kingdom by the steamship Rosetta (United Kingdom).

== 4 June ==
List of shipwrecks: 4 June 1883
Ship	State	Description
Chillingham	United Kingdom	The steamship collided with the steamship Fern Holme (United Kingdom) at Bombay, India and was severely damaged.
Hansa	Germany	The brig was wrecked in Struys Bay. Her crew were rescued. She was on a voyage from Rio de Janeiro, Brazil to Table Bay.

== 6 June ==
List of shipwrecks: 6 June 1883
Ship	State	Description
Ala Charles	United Kingdom	The schooner foundered off the coast of Cornwall 4 nautical miles (7.4 km) south of the Sevenstones Sands Lightship ( Trinity House). Her four crew survived. She was on a voyage from Workington, Cumberland to Southampton, Hampshire.
Maria Wilhelmina	Netherlands	The barque was driven ashore at "Skar Faro", Sweden.

== 7 June ==
List of shipwrecks: 7 June 1883
Ship	State	Description
Joseph Dodds	United Kingdom	The steamship foundered in the Mediterranean Sea off Cape Guardia, Algeria with the loss of her captain. She was on a voyage from the Levant to an English port.
Scorton	United Kingdom	The steamship foundered off Cape Guardia. Her crew were rescued. She was on a voyage from the Levant to an English port.

== 10 June ==
List of shipwrecks: 10 June 1883
Ship	State	Description
Ocean	United Kingdom	The brig was run into by the steamship Minerva (United Kingdom) and sank in the North Sea 12 nautical miles (22 km) off Hartlepool, County Durham with the loss of a crew member.

== 11 June ==
List of shipwrecks: 11 June 1883
Ship	State	Description
Asterope	United Kingdom	The ship was driven ashore and wrecked at Tamar Heas, Tasmania. She was on a voyage from London to Launceston, Tasmania.
Traveller	United Kingdom	The ship ran aground and was wrecked at Penedo, Brazil.

== 12 June ==
List of shipwrecks: 12 June 1883
Ship	State	Description
Hunstanton	United Kingdom	The ship ran aground and sank near Sandhammeren, Sweden. Her crew survived.
Mindet	Norway	The barque foundered in the Indian Ocean with the loss of two of her crew. She was on a voyage from New York, United States to Anjer, Netherlands East Indies.

== 13 June ==
List of shipwrecks: 13 June 1883
Ship	State	Description
Adolph Michel	Germany	The barque collided with the steamship Oxford (United Kingdom) in the Baltic Sea and was severely damaged. She put in to Slite, Gotland, Sweden.

== 14 June ==
List of shipwrecks: 14 June 1883
Ship	State	Description
Alice	Germany	The steamship was driven ashore on Saaremaa, Russia.
Union	Norway	The steamship collided with the steamship Commodore (United Kingdom) in the Lapground and sank. Her crew were rescued.

== 15 June ==
List of shipwrecks: 15 June 1883
Ship	State	Description
State of Indiana	United Kingdom	The steamship ran aground in the Swash Channel. She was on a voyage from Glasgow, Renfrewshire to New York, United States. She was refloated and completed her voyage.

== 16 June ==
List of shipwrecks: 16 June 1883
Ship	State	Description
Mary Coverdale	United Kingdom	The steamship was driven ashore at Trelleborg, Sweden. She was on a voyage from West Hartlepool, Norway to Egersund, Norway.

== 18 June ==
List of shipwrecks: 18 June 1883
Ship	State	Description
Knight of the Bath	United Kingdom	The ship was wrecked in the Kooria Mooria Islands with the loss of sixteen of her 33 crew. She was on a voyage from Bombay, India to Havre de Grâce, Seine-Inférieure, France.

== 19 June ==
List of shipwrecks: 19 June 1883
Ship	State	Description
Diana	United Kingdom	The dandy was driven ashore and wrecked at the Birling Gap, Sussex. She was on a voyage from Newhaven to the Birling Gap.
Madonna	Norway	The brig, which had struck the Horns Reef on 17 June, foundered off Hanstholm, Denmark. Her crew were rescued. She was on a voyage from Trinidad to Nörrkoping, Sweden.

== 20 June ==
List of shipwrecks: 20 June 1883
Ship	State	Description
Conqueror	United Kingdom	The ship was sighted whilst on a voyage from Penarth, Glamorgan to Valparaíso, Chile. No further trace, reported missing.

== 22 June ==
List of shipwrecks: 22 June 1883
Ship	State	Description
Louise	United Kingdom	The schooner struck the wreck of Hannah Marrice (United Kingdom) and sank off Margate, Kent. Her crew survived. She was on a voyage from London to Looe, Cornwall.
Waitara	New Zealand	The steamship was run into by the steamship Hurunui (United Kingdom) and sank in the English Channel 45 nautical miles (83 km) south east of Portland Bill, Dorset, United Kingdom with the loss of 27 lives. Waitara was on a voyage from Gravesend, Kent to New Zealand.

== 23 June ==
List of shipwrecks: 23 June 1883
Ship	State	Description
Ilderton	United Kingdom	The steamship ran aground at "Mencorn", Ouessant, Finistère, France. Her crew were rescued. She was on a voyuage from Bombay, India to Hull, Yorkshire.

== 28 June ==
List of shipwrecks: 28 June 1883
Ship	State	Description
Tropic	United States	The steamship was wrecked on Fortune Island, Bahamas.

== 29 June ==
List of shipwrecks: 29 June 1883
Ship	State	Description
Rievaulx Abbey	United Kingdom	The steamship ran aground in the Gulf of Bothnia. She was on a voyageb from Munksund, Sweden to London. She was refloated on 7 July and taken in to Holmsund.
Two Friends	United Kingdom	The ship departed from the Rio Grande do Sul for Falmouth, Cornwall. No further trace, reported overdue.

== Unknown date ==
List of shipwrecks: Unknown date in June 1883
Ship	State	Description
City of Rome	United Kingdom	The steamship ran aground in the Gedney Channel. She was refloated and resumed her voyagte.
Dentholm	United Kingdom	The ship ran aground in the Sound of Kerrera.
Fortunato	Italy	The barque foundered at sea before 16 June. Her crew were rescued by the barque Malvina (Germany).
Langshaw	United Kingdom	The steamship was wrecked at Cape Pine, Newfoundland Colony. Her crew survived. She was on a voyage from Montreal, Quebec, Canada to London.
HMS Lively	Royal Navy	The despatch vessel was wrecked on the Hen and Chickens Rocks, Isle of Lewis, Outer Hebrides. The wreck broke up on 28 June.
Miranda	United Kingdom	The steamship was driven ashore and severely damaged on Hiiumaa, Russia.
Remus	United Kingdom	The steamship was driven ashore at "Flinterden". She was on a voyage from Sunderland, County Durham to Kronstadt, Russia. She was refloated and taken in to Copenhagen, Denmark.
Udjus	Norway	The barque was driven ashore at Östergarnsholm, Sweden. She was refloated and found to be waterlogged.
Ville de Fuveau	France	The ship was wrecked at Sangomar, French Senegal.
