= DLP =

DLP may refer to:

== Politics ==
- Democratic Left Party (Turkey), a political party from Turkey
- Democratic Labour Party (Australia), an Australian political party
- Democratic Labour Party (Barbados), a major political party in Barbados
- Democratic Labour Party (New Zealand), a former New Zealand political party
- Democratic Labour Party (Trinidad and Tobago), a political party in Trinidad and Tobago
- Dominica Labour Party, a social democratic political party in Dominica
- Dominion Labor Party (Alberta)
- Dominion Labour Party (Manitoba)
- Dutch Labour Party, in the Netherlands

== Science and technology ==
- Data level parallelism, a form of data parallelism in computer science
- Data loss prevention, a field of computer security; See Data loss prevention software
- Digital light processing, a display device based on optical micro-electro-mechanical technology
- Discrete logarithm problem, a mathematical problem with applications to cryptography
- Document Liberation Project, a project of The Document Foundation
- Dose-length product, a CT scan radiation dose
- Deep Learning Processor, an electronic circuit designed for deep learning algorithms

== Other uses ==
- Delta Lambda Phi, the name of a social fraternity for gay, bisexual, and progressive men
- Disneyland Paris
- Deep-lying playmaker, a position and role in association football (soccer)
- Dyslipidemia, medical disorder of lipid metabolism which leads to increased risk of cardiovascular disease

== See also ==
- Democratic Labour Party (disambiguation)
