= Sine River =

River in Senegal

Coordinates: 14°10′N 16°27′W

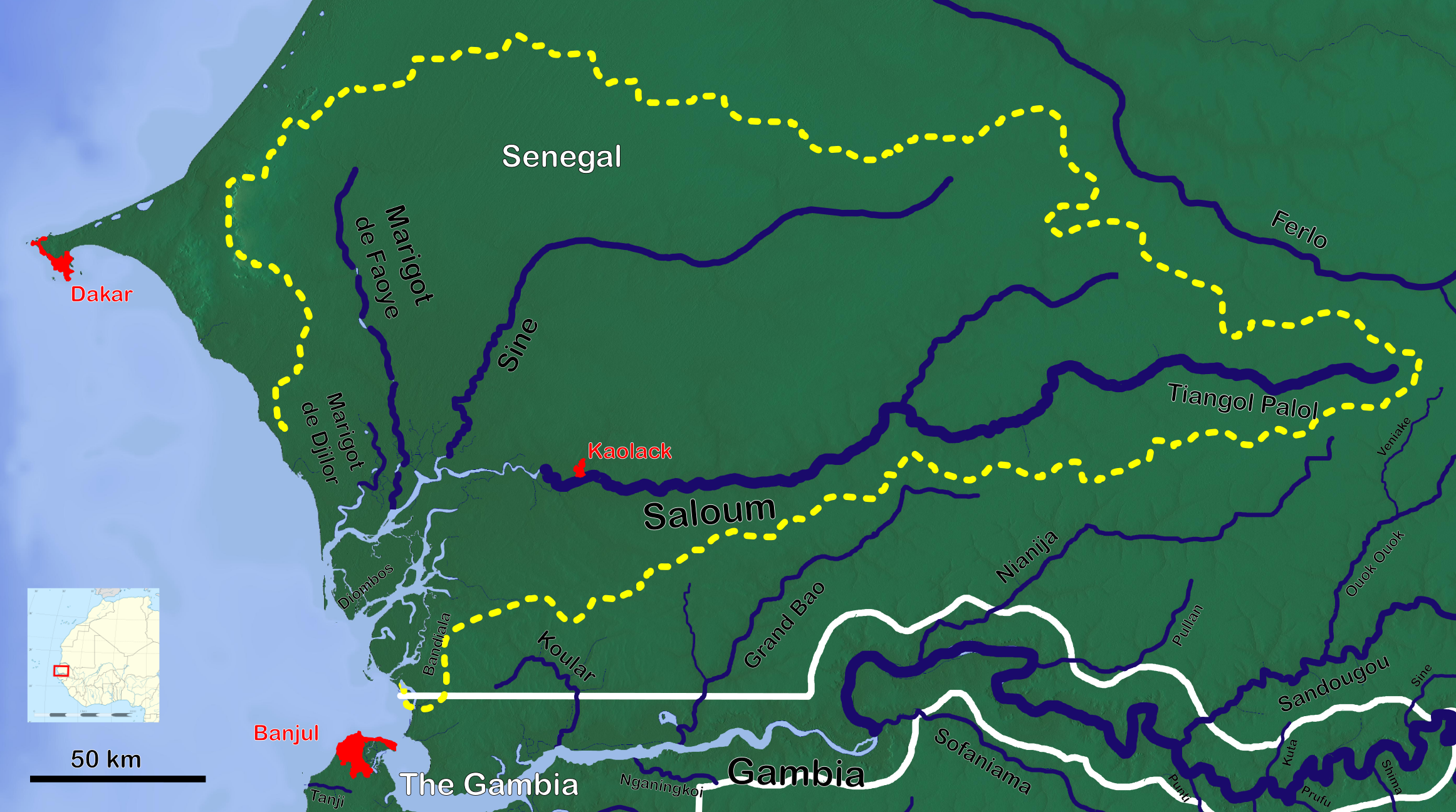

The River Sine or Sine River (Siin in Serer language; La Rivière Sine in French language) is a river in Senegal. It flows into the Atlantic Ocean with the River Saloum in the delta of Sine-Saloum.

== See also ==
- Saloum Delta National Park, a UNESCO World Heritage site.
- Saloum River
- Sine-Saloum
