= Epiphany of the Lord Church of Nianing =

Church in Nianing, Senegal

Coordinates: 14.3478°N 16.9287°W

- Church Nianing
- Église Sainte-Épiphanie-du-Seigneur de Nianing
- Epiphany of the Lord Church of Nianing
- Country: Senegal

Architecture
- Architect: Nicolas Vernoux-Thelot
- Groundbreaking: 2014
- Completed: 2018

Specifications
- Capacity: 800

Administration
- Diocese: Archdiocese of Senegal

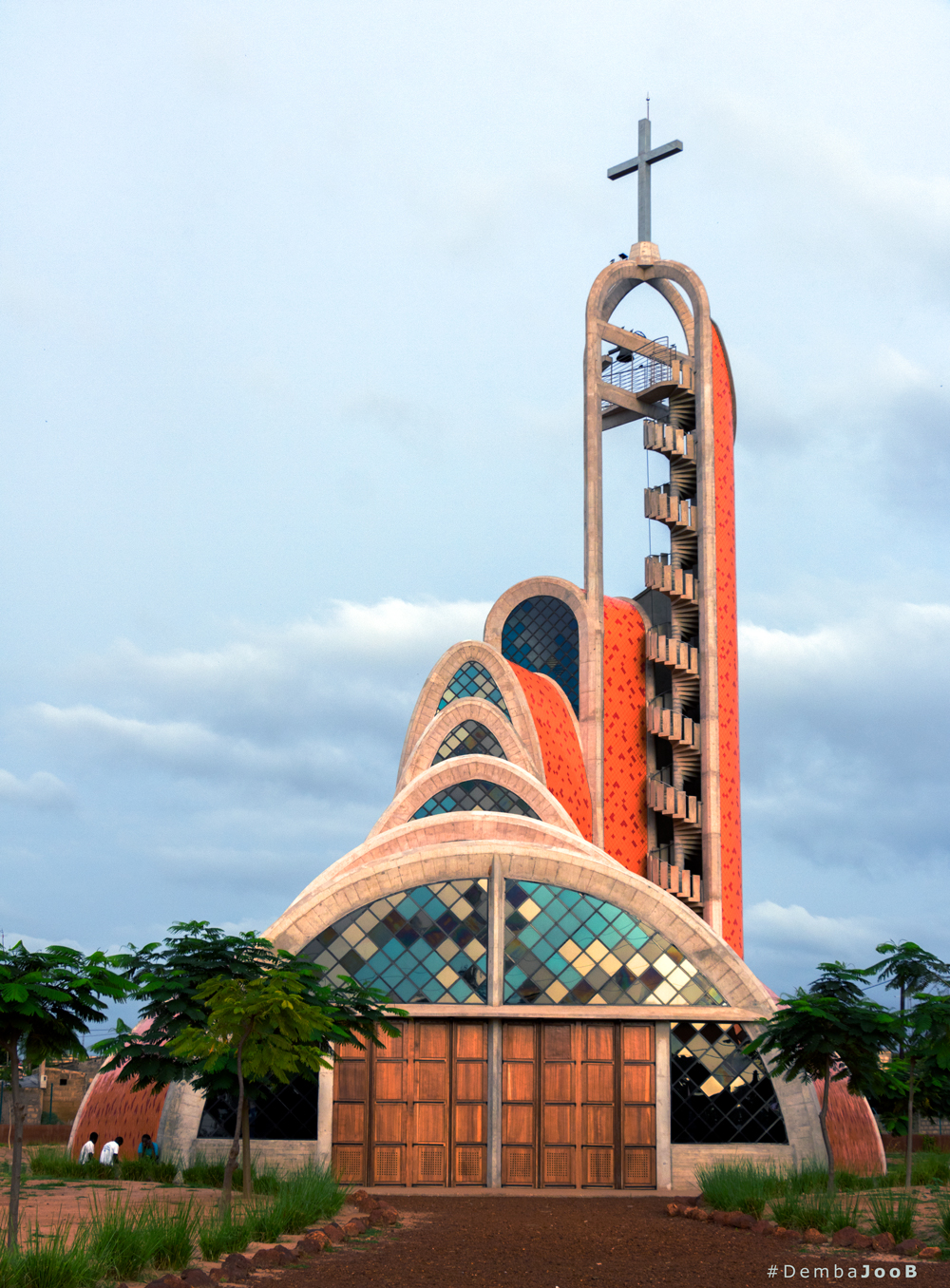

The Epiphany of the Lord Church of Nianing (French: Église Sainte-Épiphanie-du-Seigneur de Nianing) is a Catholic church in Nianing, Senegal.

== History ==
The construction of the Epiphany of the Lord Church in Nianing commenced with the laying of the foundation stone in December 2014 by Cardinal Théodore Adrien Sarr, Archbishop of Dakar. It was set to be delivered to the Catholic community of the locality within 18 months. The project was funded by French benefactor Patrick Thelot in collaboration with other partners at a cost of several hundred million CFA francs.

In February 2018, the church was inaugurated by archbishop Benjamin Ndiaye in the presence of notable figures including the President of the National Assembly, Moustapha Niasse, the French Ambassador to Senegal, Christophe Bigot, and Cardinal Théodore Adrien Sarr. Prior to this, the Christian community of Nianing had been in need of a church, relying on a chapel for worship.

The church was awarded for its excellence in Architectural Design within the category of Miscellaneous Architecture by Architecture MasterPrize.

== Architecture ==
The church is shaped like a seashell, inspired by the spiral form of the cymbium widely found along the Petite-Côte and Senegalese coastlines. Designed by architect Nicolas Vernoux-Thélot, the structure incorporates bioclimatic principles and construction constraints.

The church's seating capacity of 800 is characterized by a succession of six vaults, culminating in the height of the bell tower. The first double vault, with a lowered and skewed arch, has an average width of 18.50 meters and a height of 7.60 meters. It consists of 3 main transverse concrete arches plus 4 crossed arches at the center of the vault.

Embracing sustainable development principles, the church eschews traditional air-conditioning systems, relying solely on passive ventilation. The structure is enclosed on its northern side to shield against the hot, arid winds of the Harmattan, while deliberately opening towards the west to invite the cooling trade winds from the sea. The bell tower serves as a "wind tower," harnessing natural convection to draw in the trade winds and facilitate natural ventilation within the building. The design also incorporates biomimetic features inspired by termite mounds, which efficiently regulate internal temperatures despite extreme external conditions.
