= Labor Faction =

Labour Faction or Labor Faction can refer to:

- Labour Faction (1937)
- Labour Faction (1989)
- Erroneous reference to any Labour Party (disambiguation)

== See also ==
- Labour action, a work stoppage, usually in response to employee grievances
