= Communist party =

Political party that promotes communist philosophy and values

A communist party is a political party that seeks to realize the socio-economic goals of communism. The term "communist party" was popularized by the title of The Manifesto of the Communist Party (1848) by Karl Marx and Friedrich Engels. As a vanguard party, the communist party guides the political education and development of the working class (proletariat). As a ruling party, the communist party exercises power through the dictatorship of the proletariat. Vladimir Lenin developed the idea of the communist party as the revolutionary vanguard, when the socialist movement in Imperial Russia was divided into ideologically opposed factions, the Bolshevik faction ("of the majority") and the Menshevik faction ("of the minority"). To be politically effective, Lenin proposed a small vanguard party managed with democratic centralism which allowed the centralized command of a disciplined cadre of professional revolutionaries. Once a policy was agreed upon, realizing political goals required every Bolshevik's total commitment to the agreed-upon policy.

In contrast, the Menshevik faction, which initially included Leon Trotsky, emphasized that the party should not neglect the importance of mass populations in realizing a communist revolution. In the course of the revolution, the Bolshevik party which became the Communist Party of the Soviet Union (CPSU) assumed government power in Russia after the October Revolution in 1917. With the creation of the Communist International (Comintern) in 1919, the concept of communist party leadership was adopted by many revolutionary parties, worldwide. In an effort to standardize the international communist movement ideologically and maintain central control of the member parties, the Comintern required that its members use the term "communist party" in their names.

Under the leadership of the CPSU, the interpretations of orthodox Marxism were applied to Russia and led to the emergence of Leninist and Marxist–Leninist political parties throughout the world. After the death of Lenin, the Comintern's official interpretation of Leninism was the book Foundations of Leninism (1924) by Joseph Stalin.

== Mass organizations ==
As the membership of a communist party was to be limited to active cadres in Lenin's theory, there was a need for networks of separate organizations to mobilize mass support for the party. Typically, communist parties built up various front organizations whose membership was often open to non-communists. In many countries, the single most important front organization of the communist parties was its youth wing. During the time of the Communist International, the youth leagues were explicit communist organizations, using the name 'Young Communist League'. Later the youth league concept was broadened in many countries, and names like 'Democratic Youth League' were adopted.

Some trade unions and students', women's, peasants', and cultural organizations have been connected to communist parties. Traditionally, these mass organizations were often politically subordinated to the political leadership of the party. After the fall of communist party regimes in the 1990s, mass organizations sometimes outlived their communist party founders.

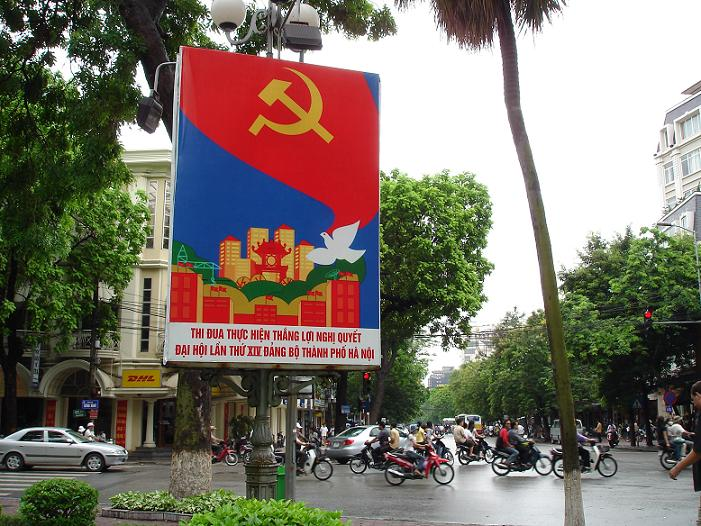
A publicity poster of the Communist Party of Vietnam in Hanoi

At the international level, the Communist International organized various international front organizations (linking national mass organizations with each other), such as the Young Communist International, Profintern, Krestintern, International Red Aid, Sportintern, etc. Many of these organizations were disbanded after the dissolution of the Communist International. After the Second World War new international coordination bodies were created, such as the World Federation of Democratic Youth, International Union of Students, World Federation of Trade Unions, Women's International Democratic Federation and the World Peace Council. The Soviet Union unified many of the Comintern's original goals in the Eastern Bloc under the aegis of a new organization, the Cominform.

Historically, in countries where communist parties were struggling to attain state power, the formation of wartime alliances with non-communist parties and wartime groups was enacted (such as the National Liberation Front of Albania). Upon attaining state power these Fronts were often transformed into nominal (and usually electoral) "National" or "Fatherland" Fronts in which non-communist parties and organizations were given token representation (a practice known as Blockpartei), the most popular examples of these being the National Front of East Germany (as a historical example) and the North Korean Reunification Front (as a modern-day example). Other times the formation of such Fronts was undertaken without the participation of other parties, such as the Socialist Alliance of Working People of Yugoslavia and the National Front of Afghanistan, though the purpose was the same: to promote the communist party line to generally non-communist audiences and to mobilize them to carry out tasks within the country under the aegis of the Front.

Recent scholarship has developed the comparative political study of global communist parties by examining similarities and differences across historical geographies. In particular, the rise of revolutionary parties, their spread internationally, the appearance of charismatic revolutionary leaders and their ultimate demise during the decline and fall of communist parties worldwide have all been the subject of investigation.

== Naming ==
A uniform naming scheme for communist parties was adopted by the Communist International. All parties were required to use the name 'Communist Party of (name of the country)', resulting in separate communist parties in some countries operating using (largely) homonymous party names (e.g. in India). Today, there are a few cases where the original sections of the Communist International have retained those names. But throughout the twentieth century, many parties changed their names. For example, following their ascension to power, the Bolshevik Party changed their name to the All-Russian Communist Party. Causes for these shifts in naming were either moves to avoid state repression or as measures to generate greater acceptance by local populations.

An important example of the latter was the renaming of many Eastern European communist parties after the Second World War, sometimes as a result of mergers with the local social democratic and democratic socialist parties. New names in the post-war era included "Socialist Party", "Socialist Unity Party", "People's (or Popular) Party", "Workers' Party" and "Party of Labour".

The naming conventions of communist parties became more diverse as the international communist movement was fragmented due to the Sino-Soviet split in the 1960s. Those who sided with China and Albania in their criticism of the Soviet leadership, often added words like 'Revolutionary' or 'Marxist–Leninist' to distinguish themselves from the pro-Soviet parties.

== Membership ==
In 1985, approximately 38 percent of the world's population lived under "communist" governments (1.67 billion out of 4.4 billion). The CPSU's International Department officially recognized 95 ruling and nonruling communist parties. Overall, if one includes the 107 parties with significant memberships, there were approximately 82 million communist party members worldwide. Given its worldwide representation, the communist party may be counted as the principal challenger to the influence of liberal-democratic, catch-all parties in the twentieth century.

Following the collapse of the Eastern Bloc between 1989–1992, most of these parties either disappeared or were renamed and adopted different goals than their predecessors. In the 21st century, only five ruling parties on the national level still described themselves as Marxist–Leninist parties: the Chinese Communist Party, the Communist Party of Cuba, the Communist Party of Vietnam, the Workers' Party of Korea and the Lao People's Revolutionary Party. As of 2023, the Chinese Communist Party was the world's second largest political party, having over 99 million members.

== Views ==
Although the historical importance of communist parties is widely accepted, their activities and functions have been interpreted in different ways. One approach, sometimes known as the totalitarian school of communist studies, has implicitly treated all communist parties as the same types of organizations. Scholars such as Zbigniew Brzezinski and François Furet have relied upon conceptions of the party emphasizing centralized control, a top-down hierarchical structure, ideological rigidity, and strict party discipline. In contrast, other studies have emphasized the differences among communist parties. Multi-party studies, such as those by Robert C. Tucker and A. James McAdams, have emphasized the differences in both these parties' organizational structure and their use of Marxist and Leninist ideas to justify their policies.

Another important question is why communist parties were able to rule for as long as they did. Some scholars have depicted these parties as fatally flawed from their inception and argue they only remained in power because their leaders were willing to use their monopoly of power and the state monopoly to crush all forms of opposition. In contrast, other studies have emphasized these parties' ability to adapt their policies to changing times and circumstances.

== See also ==
- Criticism of communist party rule
