= Hamid Reza Chitgar =

- Born: 7 July 1949
- Died: 19 May 1987 (aged 38); Austria

Hamid Reza Chitgar (7 July 1949 – 19 May 1987, also known as Hamid Bahmani) was an exiled Iranian communist politician who lived in France after the Iranian Revolution and was assassinated in Austria by the Iranian government.

== Early life and education ==
Hamid Reza Chitgar was born in the town of Babol in the Mazandaran province of Iran in 1949. After finishing his engineering studies in Tehran, he pursued his master's in Strasbourg, France in the mid 1970s.

== Arrest and defection ==
He returned in Iran and was politically active during and after the revolution. He was once arrested by the Revolutionary Guards in March 1981 for the publications of his publishing house (which published political and non-political materials). He was taken to the Evin prison and soon taken back to his printing house in order to lure other political activists. He was able to escape and lived underground for 6 months before fleeing to France in 1983 where he obtained political asylum.

== Exile ==
Chitgar was a member in the leadership of the Hezb-e Kar (Labor Party of Iran). During his stay in France, he distanced himself from the idea of armed resistance. He was the representative of the Labor Party in the National Resistance Council and was a member of the council before his assassination.

He was married and had one daughter.

== Assassination ==
According to a close source, a man named Ali Amiztab corresponded with Chitgar from Iran a couple of years before his murder and established a regular contact with him. In his letters, he wrote about establishing a group of sympathizers of the Labor Party in Iran. Finally, he asked to meet Chitgar in person and set up a meeting in Vienna, Austria. Chitgar who never traveled alone and did not trust his interlocutor tried to find friends to travel with him. For various reasons, no one was available and Chitgar decided to go alone. On 19 May 1987, he traveled to Vienna to meet with this man.

His wife did not receive any news from him and after a few days, began to look for him and alerted the Austrian police. The efforts of his wife and family proved fruitless until the neighbors of the apartment, where Chitgar was murdered, complained about the odor and police discovered his body on 17 July, two months after the murder. He had been shot twice in the back of his head.

According to the Austrian police, the apartment had been rented by an individual with a Turkish passport for three months. The rent was paid in full. The efforts of the family's lawyer to encourage the investigation and obtain more information were not successful. The Austrian authorities noted that investigation in the case of Chitgar's assassination was difficult because the agent of the Islamic Republic had a Turkish passport and did not need a visa to come to Austria. No other information was given to the family.

The assassination was widely reported in the local press and caused a wave of protests by Iranian and European political groups. Hamid Reza Chitgar's body was buried in the Père-Lachaise cemetery in Paris on 8 August 1987.

== Further investigations ==
Iranian-born Dutch film maker Reza Allamehzadeh made a documentary on state terrorism of the Islamic government of Iran in European countries, Holy Crime, where the case of Mr. Chitgar was presented amongst many others, such as Iran's former prime minister Shapour Bakhtiar who had also been assassinated during his French exile .
