= Djifer =

- Location in Fatick Region and Senegal
- Coordinates: 13°56′6.2772″N 16°45′46.656″W
- Country: Senegal
- Region: Fatick Region
- Department: Fatick Department
- Elevation: 13 ft (4 m)

Population
  - Total: ~2,000
- Time zone: UTC+0 (GMT)

Djifer is a coastal village in Fatick Department in Fatick Region, Senegal. It is located 10 km south of Palmarin at the end of the Point of Sangomar.

== Climate ==
Djifer has a hot semi-arid climate (Köppen BSh) with no rainfall from November to May and moderate to heavy rainfall from June to October.

Climate data for Djifer
Month	Jan	Feb	Mar	Apr	May	Jun	Jul	Aug	Sep	Oct	Nov	Dec	Year
Mean daily maximum °C (°F)	31.7 (89.1)	33.0 (91.4)	34.1 (93.4)	33.7 (92.7)	33.3 (91.9)	33.3 (91.9)	31.9 (89.4)	31.1 (88.0)	31.7 (89.1)	33.3 (91.9)	33.9 (93.0)	31.9 (89.4)	32.7 (90.9)
Daily mean °C (°F)	23.9 (75.0)	24.8 (76.6)	26.0 (78.8)	26.4 (79.5)	26.9 (80.4)	28.2 (82.8)	27.8 (82.0)	27.2 (81.0)	27.4 (81.3)	28.0 (82.4)	27.0 (80.6)	24.5 (76.1)	26.5 (79.7)
Mean daily minimum °C (°F)	16.1 (61.0)	16.7 (62.1)	18.0 (64.4)	19.1 (66.4)	20.6 (69.1)	23.1 (73.6)	23.8 (74.8)	23.4 (74.1)	23.2 (73.8)	22.8 (73.0)	20.1 (68.2)	17.1 (62.8)	20.3 (68.6)
Average rainfall mm (inches)	1 (0.0)	0 (0)	0 (0)	0 (0)	1 (0.0)	41 (1.6)	143 (5.6)	291 (11.5)	205 (8.1)	52 (2.0)	3 (0.1)	1 (0.0)	738 (28.9)
Source: Climate-Data.org
