= Tourism in Senegal =

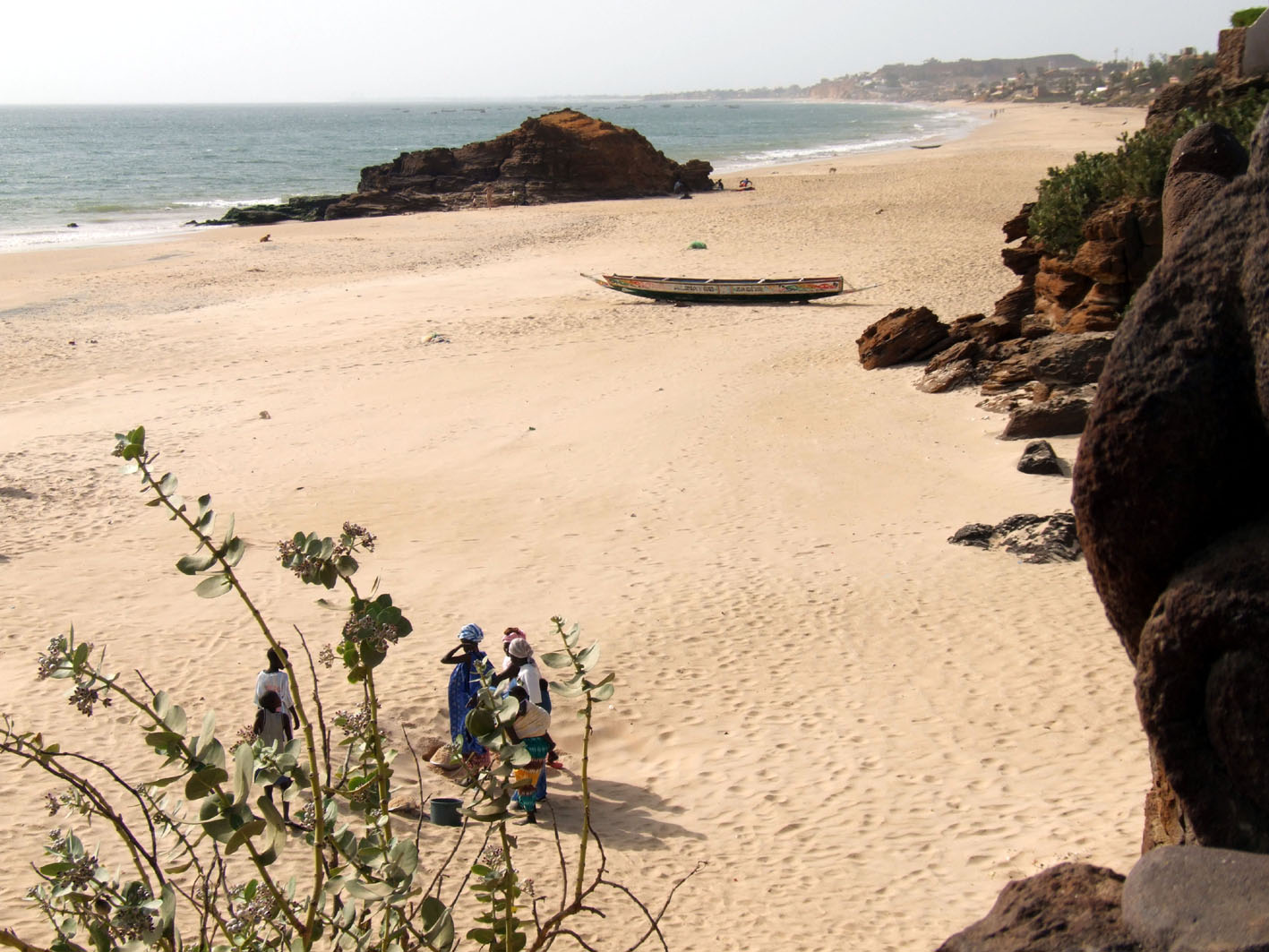
Beach and cliffs at Toubab Dialao, (Petite Côte, Senegal).

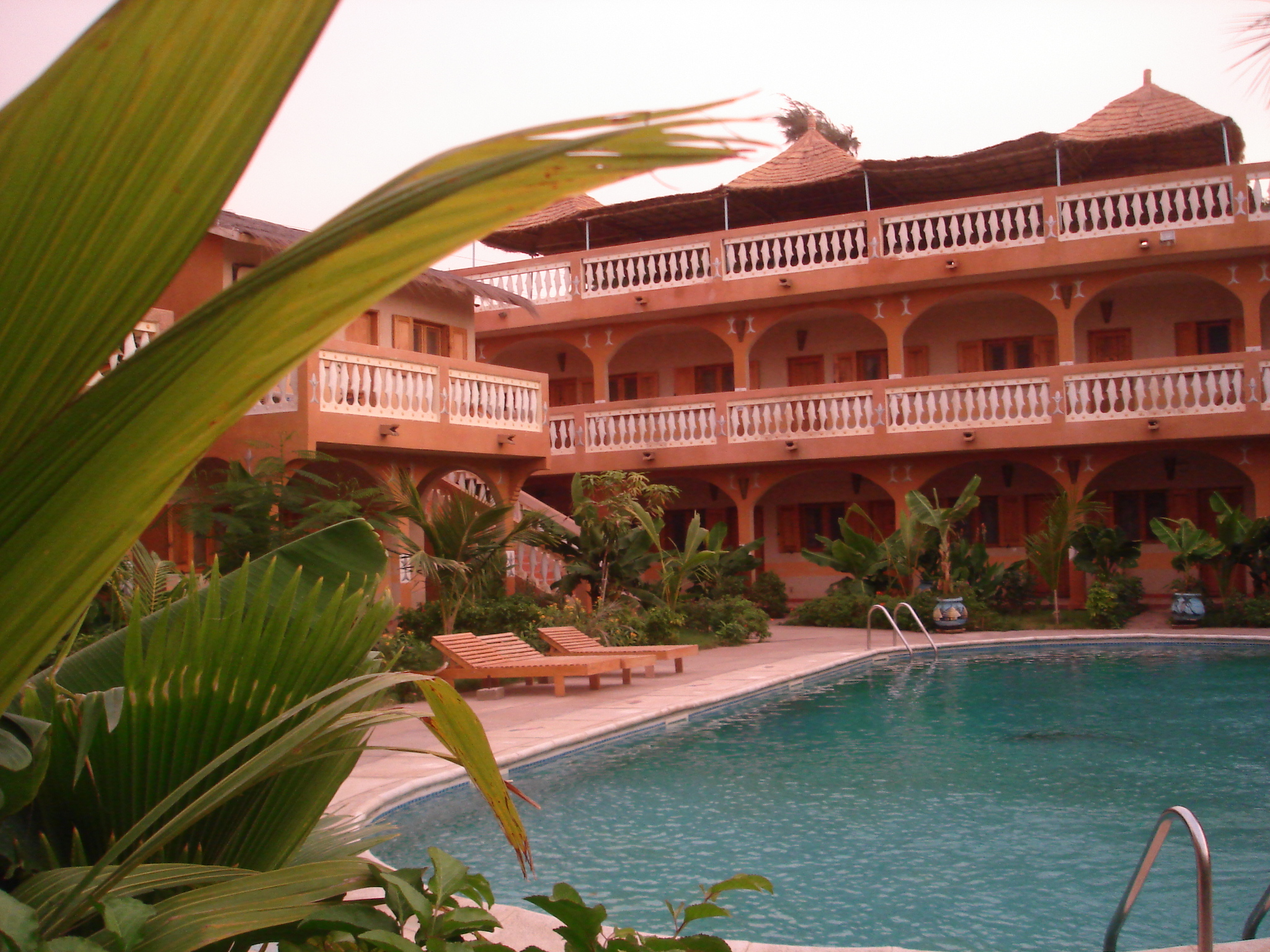
A modern tourist hotel catering to Europeans in the resort town of Saly.

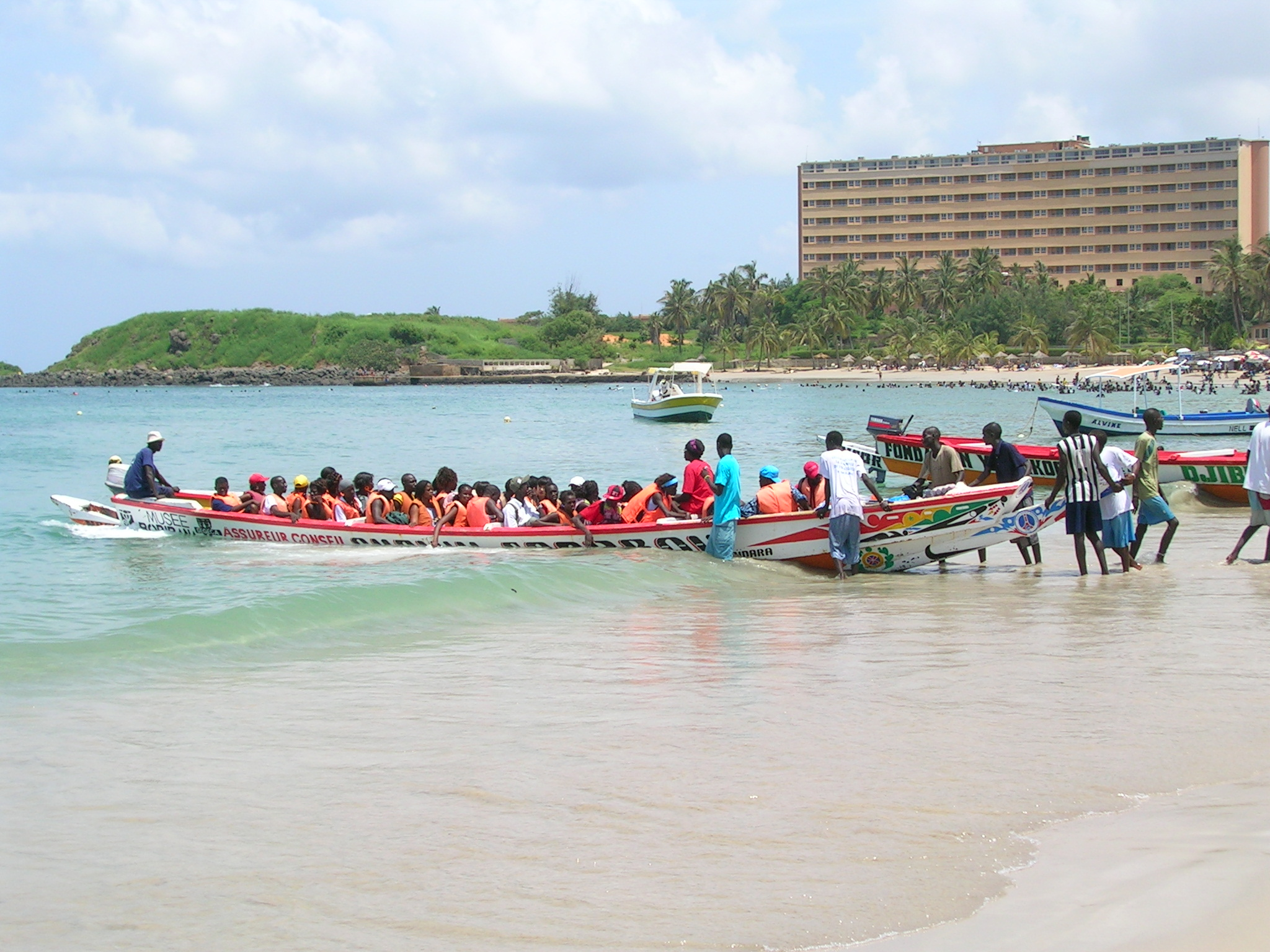
Visitors loaded into a Pirogue for a pleasure trip from Ngor to île de Ngor, a popular holiday spot for Dakar's locals. In the background is the Ngor Hotel, catering to Senegalese and business travelers to Dakar.

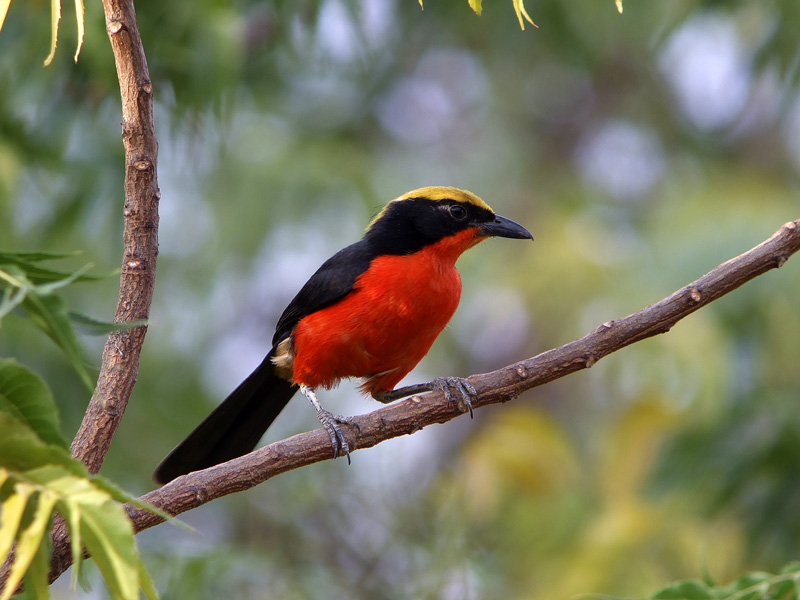
A yellow-crowned gonolek (Laniarius barbarus), photographed in the estuaries of the Saloum Delta National Park.

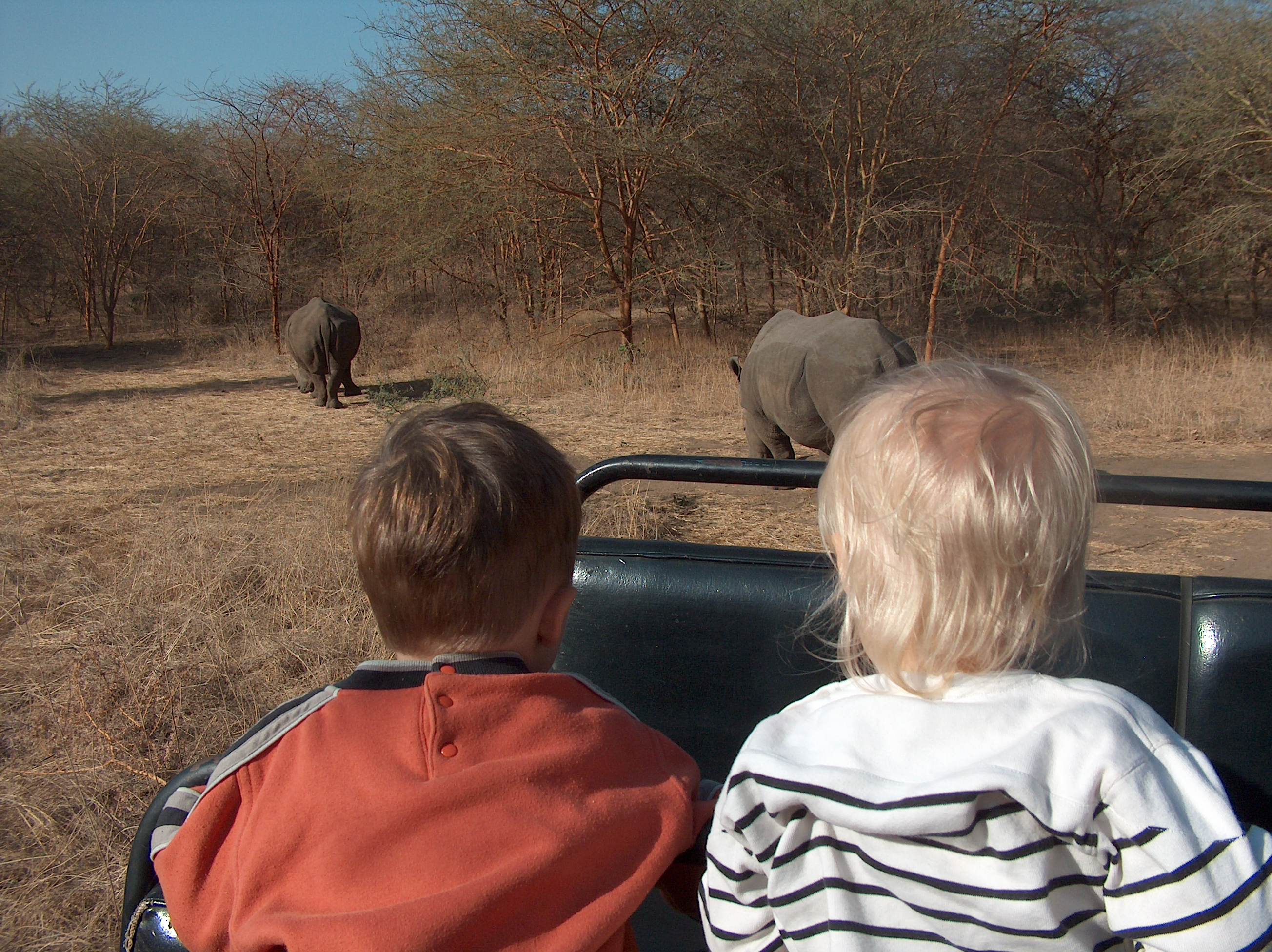
Western tourists visit rhinoceroses kept at the Bandia Natural Reserve near Dakar.

Tourism in Senegal is a vital part of the West African nation's economy.

== Scale ==
From a relatively small industry at the introduction of the first Club Med resort in the 1970s, tourism has grown to be an important part of the Senegalese economy. Since the 1990s, Senegal has made an effort to reach beyond visitors from the former colonial power France and is attracting tourists from Spain, Britain and Italy, in part motivated by the example of neighboring Gambia, which draws a relatively larger tourist share from Northern Europe and the Americas to its Banjul coastal resorts.

In 2008, Senegal's foreign tourist visitors had reached 1 million, attracted to luxury beach resorts, natural and historic sites. The return rate for visitors stood at around 30% in 2008.

Future projections and bookings announced in 2009 raised fears that the 2008 financial crisis and Great Recession would reduce 2009 and 2010 tourist visits, with a booking rate down from 30% the year before to 5%.

== Attractions ==
Principal cities of interest include the capital, Dakar; Saint-Louis, an old colonial town; and the Mouride holy centre of Touba. Gorée Island, formerly a centre of the West African slave trade and a UNESCO World Heritage Site, draws many visitors.

Most tourists from outside Africa are Europeans, especially French, and a hotel and resort industry centered on enclosed beach resorts, mostly at resort towns like Saly on the Petite Côte south of Dakar, has arisen to appeal to this clientele since the 1970s. U.S. tourists - often African-Americans - are increasing in numbers, drawn in particular by the historic slave trading post of Goree Island.

Resort vacations are often supplemented by wildlife and nature tours of areas like the Sine-Saloum Delta, the Grande Côte (north of Dakar), the Lac Rose, and Senegal River delta in the north (near Saint-Louis). There are also safari trips offered to see wildlife, perhaps limited by east or South African standards.

=== National parks and reserves ===
Senegal has a small but developing National Park and Reserve System. Notable among these are the Langue de Barbarie National Park and Djoudj National Bird Sanctuary, which provide wildlife habitat in the dunes and mangrove swamps surrounding the mouth of the Senegal River near city of Saint-Louis.

The Niokolo-Koba National Park is a World Heritage Site and natural protected area in south eastern Senegal, near the Guinea-Bissau border, which protects a large variety of wild animals, including hippopotamuses, elephants, and lions. Largely undeveloped, the area is remote and lacks tourist infrastructure, but is a destination for specialty tours.

The Basse Casamance National Park, in the far southwest, includes both ecotourism and tropical forest excursions, and a popular coastal beach resort aimed at foreign tourism. Birdwatching is a major draw. The Casamance conflict has hindered tourist development in this area. The Park has been closed now for a number of years due to rebel activity and mines. On attempting to enter the park (Jan 2019) via Emaye I was turned back by heavily armed army personnel, in no uncertain terms.

The Saloum Delta National Park is a large area of mangrove estuaries and islands, visited by tourists for its wildlife, its cultural interest as the home of the minority Serer people, and its proximity to the tourist resorts of the Petite-Côte. Smaller parks and reserves, like the Guembeul Natural Reserve in the center west, or the Bandia Natural Reserve near Dakar, exit primarily for the more conventional European tourist industry, resembling wildlife parks or zoos.

== Infrastructure ==
The main entrance point is Dakar-Blaise Diagne International Airport. Senegal's capital city of Dakar, on the westernmost point of the continent, is strategically located.

European flights into Dakar are populated by a mix of Senegalese living abroad, African travelers making connections, western European tourists, and a recent surge in Asian workers traveling to work on Chinese government-funded construction projects.

United States–based Delta Air Lines opened in December 2006 an Atlanta-Dakar-Johannesburg-Dakar-Atlanta route. The Open Skies Agreement between the U.S. and Senegal signed in January 2001 laid the foundation for direct routes between the U.S. and Senegal by U.S. carriers.

British based travel companies, long organising trips to neighbouring anglophone Gambia, have begun entering a package travel market to Senegal which was until recently dominated by French and Belgian companies.

== Governance and promotion ==
Regulation, promotion and development of the nation's tourist sector is the remit of Senegal's Ministry of Senegalese Overseas and Tourism (Ministère des Sénégalais de l'Extérieur et du Tourisme (SENEX) or sometimes Ministère des Sénégalais de L'extérieur, de L'artisanat et du Tourisme).

A number of agencies, boards, and partnerships which administer promote and regulate the Senegalese tourism sector report to this ministry. These include the Directorate for the Study and Planning of Tourism (Direction des Etudes et de la Planification touristique), the Directorate of Tourism Regulation and Structure (Direction de la Réglementation et de l’Encadrement du Tourisme), and the National Tourist Promotion Board (Agence nationale de la Promotion touristique – ANPT).

In addition, offices of the Ministry specialise in Tourist industry infrastructural and promotion funding (the Secrétariat du Comité de Gestion du Fonds de Promotion Touristique) and oversea a Tourist industry training school (the Secrétariat du Comité de Gestion du Fonds de Promotion Touristique - ENFHT).
