= Lycée Français Jacques Prévert =

French international school in Saly, Senegal

Coordinates: 14.4593°N 17.0081°W

- Saly; Senegal

Information
- School type: International School
- Established: 2007
- Language: French
- Website: https://www.lyceeprevertsaly.com/

Lycée Français Jacques Prévert is a French international school in Saly, Senegal. It serves levels primaire (primary school) through lycée (senior high school/sixth form).

== History ==
The school was founded in 2007.
