= Mar Lodj =

Island in Senegal

Coordinates: 14°03′N 16°40′W

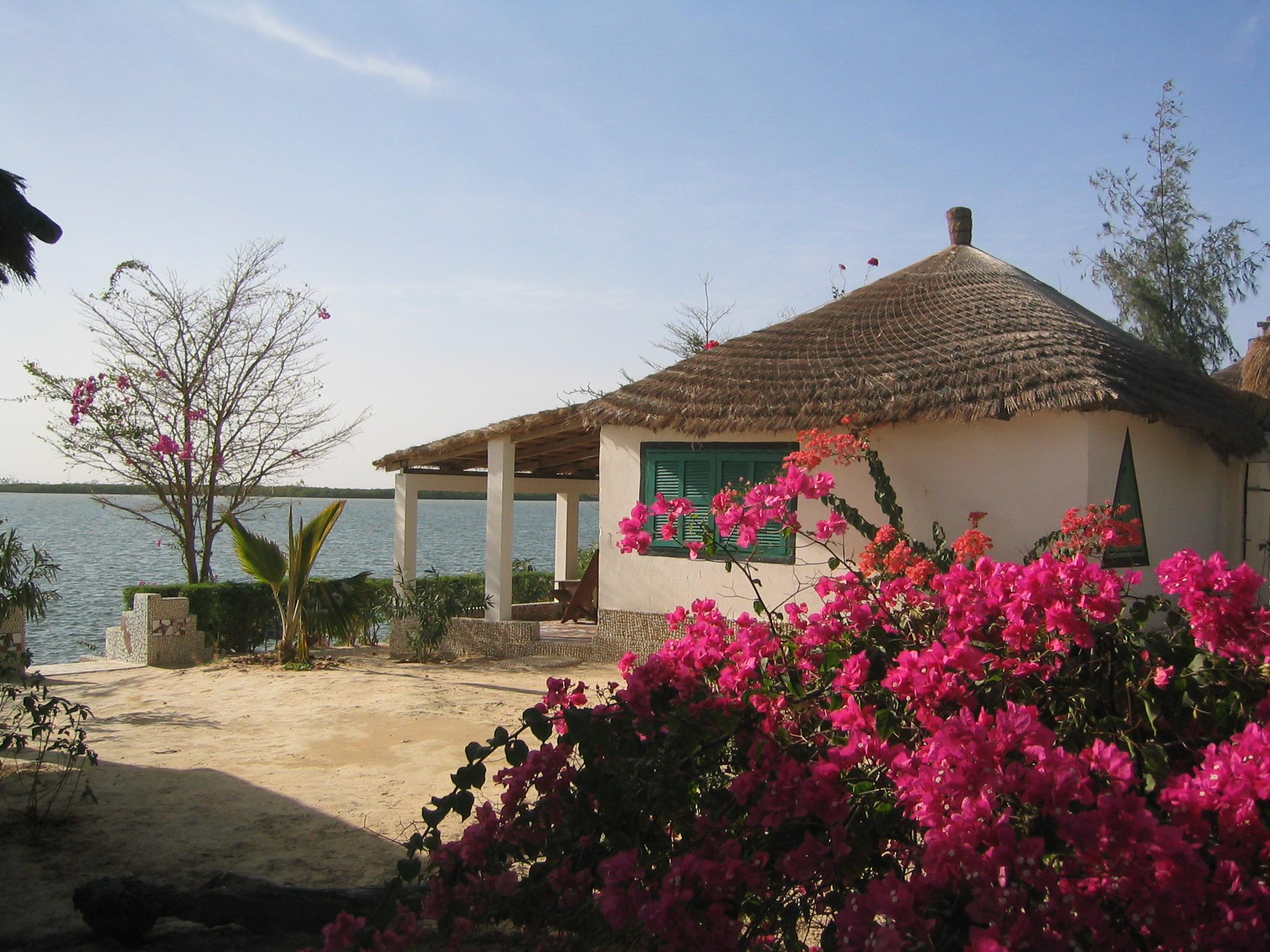
Camp on the island of Mar Lodj (Senegal). 2007

Mar Lodj is an island in Senegal located in the Sine-Saloum region near Ndangane, and forty kilometers from Joal-Fadiouth. It is located within the delta of the Saloum River. The island is car-free.

The island has a significant fishing community, men and women contributing. Men mostly handle the fishing itself and women sell the fish. The fishing prospects have gotten worse over time, due in part to overfishing.
