= Party of Labour =

Party of Labour is a name used by various political parties throughout the world.

- Party of Labour of Albania
- Party of Labour and of the People, in Argentina
- Party of Labour of Austria
- Belarusian Party of Labour, in Belarus
- Workers' Party of Belgium
- Guatemalan Party of Labour
- Party of Labour of Iran (Toufan), in Iran
- Party of Labour (Mexico)
- Labour Party (Netherlands)
- Swiss Party of Labour
- Malian Party of Labour
- Party of Labour (Serbia)
- Party of Labour (Turkey)
- Party of Labor (Ukraine)
- German Partei der Arbeit, a Neonazi organisation later renamed Volkssozialistische Bewegung Deutschlands/Partei der Arbeit

== See also ==
- Labour Party (disambiguation)
