= Labour Party (Solomon Islands) =

The Labour Party was a political party in the Solomon Islands.

== History ==
The party was established by Honiara MP Peter Salaka in 1970. It gained support from the Honiara Labour Union.

The party was dissolved in 1971 when Salaka left the party to take the chairmanship of a parliamentary committee.
