= Democratic Labour Party (Spain) =

Democratic Labour Party Partido del Trabajo Democrático
- Secretary General: Miguel Ángel Villalón
- Founded: 2013
- Headquarters: Madrid
- Newspaper: En Marcha; La Mayoría
- Ideology: Marxism-Leninism; Republicanism; Feminism
- Town councillors: 1 / 67,611

Website
- trabajodemocratico.es

Democratic Labour Party (Spanish: Partido del Trabajo Democrático, PTD) is a Marxist-Leninist political party in Spain founded in 2013. The PTD is present in Madrid, Aragón, Asturias and Castilla-La Mancha.

== History ==
The party was founded in 2013. The PTD has been critical with the traditional language and discourse employed by the majority of leninist organizations in Spain, supporting more flexible tactics and a political speech more "understandable" by the population. In 2014 the PTD absorbed two groups, Proletarian Union and a collective of ex-members of the Collectives of Communist Youth in Castilla-La Mancha. The PTD participated in the primaries of Podemos for the European elections, electing 1 candidate in the list (Virginia Muñoz, in the number 52).

In the local elections of 2015 the party participated in various coalitions, gaining a town councillor in Alcorcón in the list of Ganar Alcorcón.
