= Niumi National Park =

National park in the Gambia

- IUCN category II (national park)
- Location within The Gambia
- Location: The Gambia
- Coordinates: 13°32′30″N 16°31′25″W
- Area: 4,940 ha (12,200 acres)
- Established: 1987

Ramsar Wetland
- Designated: 13 October 2008
- Reference no.: 1840

Niumi National Park is a national park in The Gambia. The occupies the coastal strip in the northern region of the country, in the southern tip of the Sine-Saloum Delta. It covers an area of approximately 4,940 ha (49.4 square km) and encompasses a range of types of wetlands and vegetation, from freshwater marsh to sand spits and brackish lagoons. Rhizophora mangrove forest is abundant in the park, and its swamp and mudflats are important for birds.

== Geography ==
Niumi National Park occupies the coastal strip in the southern tip of the Sine-Saloum Delta. The park, which lies in the North Bank Region, is approximately 4,940 ha (49.4 square km) in extent. The Gambia declared its portion of the Delta as a national park in 1986. In the north of the park, in the southern part of the delta is Jinack island and many small islands.

=== Flora and fauna ===
Regionally, the park forms part of the Western Africa Marine ecoregion. It encompasses a range of types of wetlands and vegetation, from freshwater marsh to sand spits and brackish lagoons. Rhizophora mangrove forest is abundant in the park, and scrub forest is found on Jinack Island and Mbankam spit.

Many species found in the park are vulnerable or endangered including the green sea turtle, humpback dolphin, red colobus and West African manatee. In the forested areas of the park, there are significant populations of patas monkey, vervet monkey, spotted hyena and warthog.

The swamp and mudflats are an important habitat for birds, with over 200 species recorded. The park has been designated an Important Bird Area (IBA) by BirdLife International because it supports significant populations of non-breeding and wintering slender-billed gulls, and Caspian, Sandwich and royal terns. Large numbers of roseate terns frequent the Atlantic coast.
