= Basse Casamance National Park =

National park in Senegal

Basse Casamance National Park; Parc National de la Basse Casamance
- IUCN category II (national park)
- Location within Senegal
- Location: Ziguinchor
- Nearest city: Oussouye
- Coordinates: 12°23′45″N 16°35′40″W
- Area: 50 km^{2} (19 sq mi)
- Established: 1970
- Website: Official website of the Ministry of Environment and Sustainable Development of Senegal (archived)

Basse Casamance National Park (French: Parc National de la Basse Casamance), located near Oussouye in Ziguinchor, is one of six national parks in Senegal. It is currently closed.

== History ==
The park was created in 1970.

== Characteristics ==
It encompasses an area of 5,000 hectares (12,000 acres).

The main biotopes are Guinean forests and savannah woodlands.

== Fauna ==
There are 200 species of birds and fifty species of mammals, including African forest buffalo, African leopard, Campbell's mona monkey, Prince Demidoff's bushbaby and western red colobus.

== Tourism ==
The site is located 20 kilometres (12 mi) from Cap Skirring Airport.

Because of the Casamance conflict, the park, possibly contaminated with land mines, has been closed to visitors for several years.

== See also ==
- Environment of Senegal
- List of national parks in Africa
- Niokolo-Koba National Park, Senegal
- Tourism in Senegal
- World Network of Biosphere Reserves in Africa
