= Sine-Saloum =

Region of Senegal

Coordinates: 14°11′N 16°15′W

Sine-Saloum is a region in Senegal located north of the Gambia and south of the Petite Côte. It encompasses an area of 24,000 square kilometers, about 12% of Senegal, with a population in the 1990s of 1,060,000.

The western portion contains the Saloum Delta, a river delta at the junction of the Saloum and the North Atlantic. It is in this region that the Saloum Delta National Park is located. 145,811 hectares of the Delta were designated a UNESCO Heritage Site in 2011. Because it flows so slowly, this delta allows saltwater to travel deep inland.

Long ago, the Serer kingdoms of Sine and Saloum were rivals. In 1984, the area was divided into two administrative regions: Kaolack and Fatick.

== Economy ==
Primary economic activities in the 2000s consisted of fishing, salt production, peanut farming, and millet farming. A secondary economy is the construction of fishing boats.

Transportation is difficult because of the many islands.

== Ecosystem ==
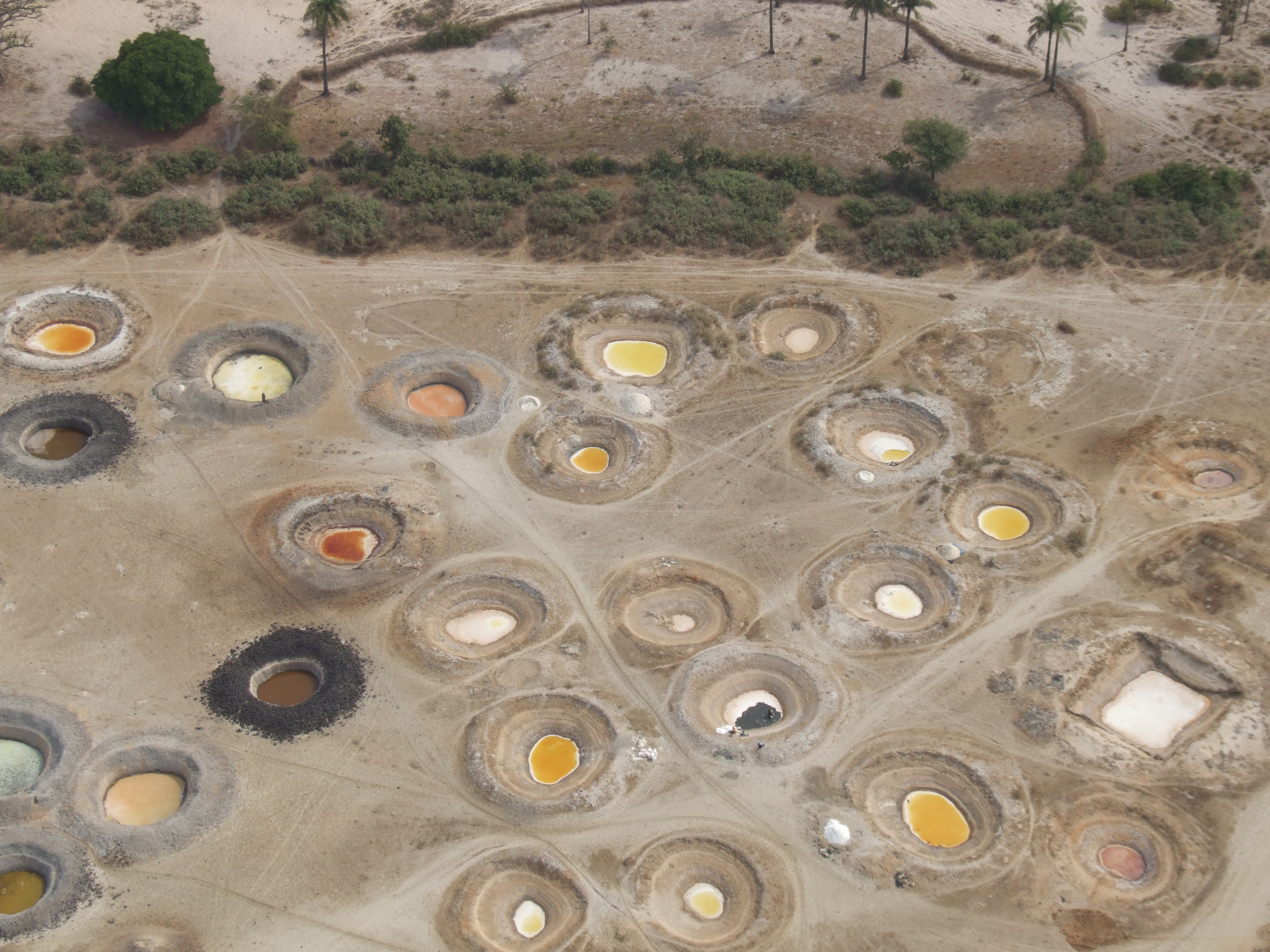
Salt wells (view from an ultralight aeroplane)

Much of the region consists of mangrove swamps. The upper reaches of the rivers adjoin the Sahel region and are affected by its desertification. The salinity of the water increased during the 1970s instance of the Sahel drought and mismanagement of the rivers upstream has been described as a factor. Mangroves are disappearing, and freshwater fish are disappearing with them. The villagers have difficulty obtaining freshwater. Sometimes water pumps are donated by international organizations, but spare parts are difficult to find when the pumps fail. The change in water salinity is affecting the ecosystem as much as it is changing the lifestyle of the inhabitants of the region.

== Navigation ==
Sine-Saloum has long been feared by outsiders' most distinguished mariners because the sandbanks move, particularly in Sangomar. This danger to outsiders has long protected the region and preserved its individual villages.

== See also ==
- Labour Party of Sine Saloum
- Tourism in Senegal
