= Labour Party of Iran (Toufan) =

Labour Party of Iran حزب کار ایران
- Founded: July 16, 1967; 58 years ago
- Split from: Tudeh Party of Iran
- Ideology: Communism; Marxism-Leninism; Hoxhaism; Anti-revisionism
- International affiliation: ICMLPO (former)

Website
- toufan.org

The Labour Party of Iran (Toufan) (Persian: حزب کار ایران (توفان); translit.: Hezb-e Kar-e Irān (Tufān)) is a Hoxhaist Communist party whose leadership is exiled in Germany. It is against the Iranian government and was a member of the International Conference of Marxist-Leninist Parties and Organizations (Unity & Struggle) until December 2025.

== History ==
The original party was founded on 16 July 1967 after a split within Tudeh over concerns of reformism, calling itself the Revolutionary Tudeh Party. It was later renamed the Marxist-Leninist Organization Toufan ("Toufan" meaning Storm.) It aligned with the People's Socialist Republic of Albania following the Sino-Albanian split.

Hamid Reza Chitgar (known as Hamid Bahmani) was the representative of the Labor Party of Iran in the 1980s during his exile, until he was assassinated by regime agents in May 1987. He was lured from his exile in France for a meeting in Austria and was found assassinated two months later in an abandoned apartment in Vienna.

The party has condemned Israeli and American aggression against Iran.

== See also ==
- List of anti-revisionist groups
