= Central Democratic Labour Party =

Political party in the Netherlands

The Central Democratic Labour Party (in Dutch: Centrale Democratische Arbeiderspartij) was a political party in the Netherlands, which participated in the 1933 parliamentary election. The party mustered 182 votes, almost exclusively from Amsterdam (0.05%).

The head of the list of the party was E.H. Baanders. The party was sometimes called the 'Baanders List'.
