= Saloum River =

River in Senegal

Coordinates: 13.963055°N 16.752777°W

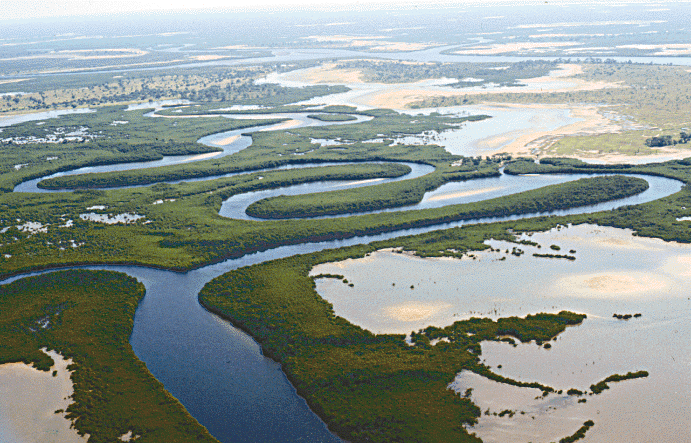

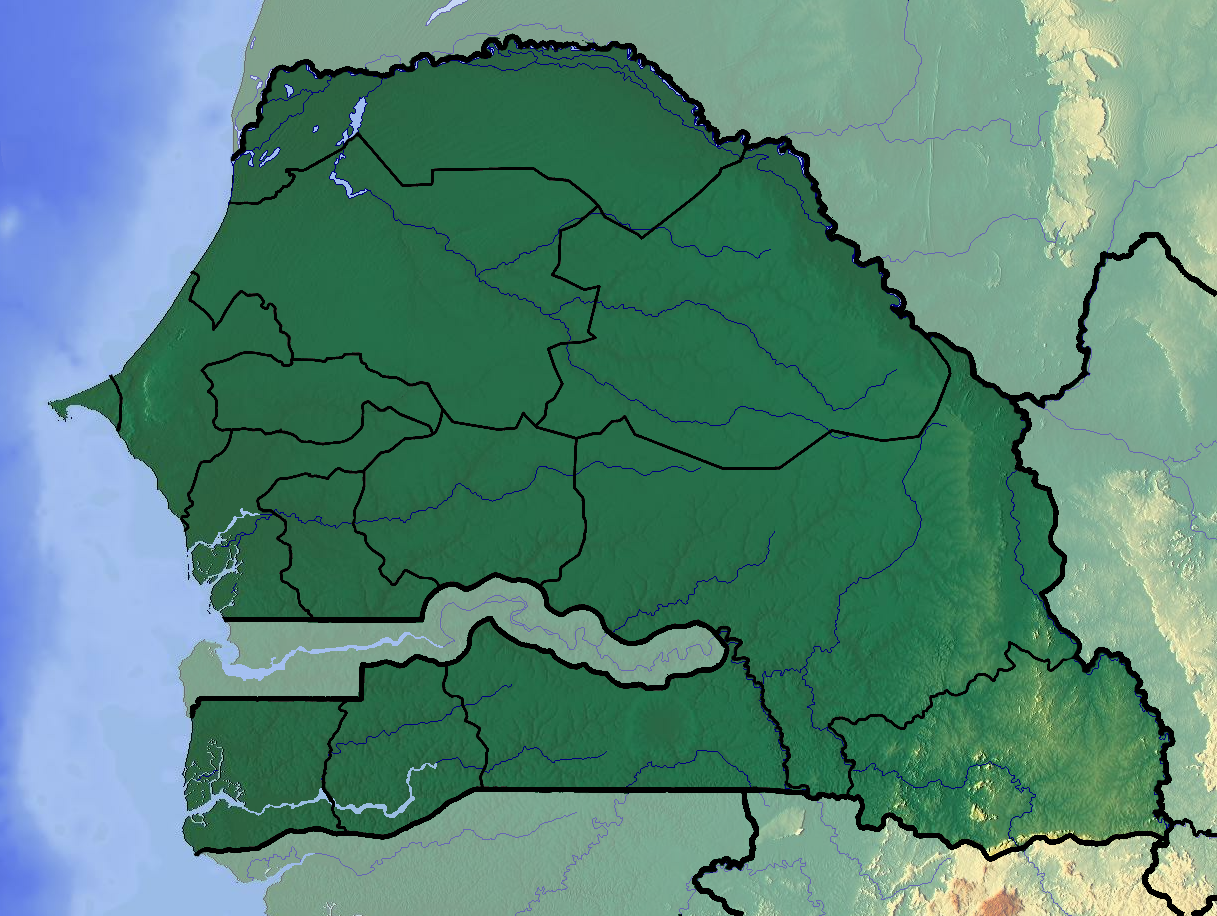

The Saloum River (French: Fleuve Saloum) rises about 105 kilometers east of Kaolack, Senegal, and flows into the Atlantic Ocean. The Saloum Delta is located at its mouth, in the protected Saloum Delta National Park. The river basin lies within what was the pre-colonial Serer kingdom, Saloum. Mangrove forests occupy a five-kilometer belt on both banks over sixty kilometers upstream.

== See also ==
- Sine River
- Sine-Saloum
