= Caribbean National Labour Party =

Political party in Trinidad and Tobago

The Caribbean National Labour Party was a political party in Trinidad and Tobago. It contested the 1956 general elections, but failed to win a seat. The party did not contest any further elections.
