= Labour Party (Greenland) =

- Founded: 1979
- Dissolved: 1983
- Merged into: Inuit Ataqatigiit
- Ideology: Social democracy Democratic socialism
- Political position: Centre-left

The Labour Party (Greenlandic: Sulisartut Partiat (old spelling: Sulissartut Partîat), Danish: Arbejderpartiet) was a short-lived leftist political party in Greenland. The party was founded in early 1979 as the political wing of the Sulinermik Inuussutissarsiuteqartut Kattuffiat (SIK) trade union centre. SIK had previously supported Siumut; however, that cooperation had been terminated in the fall of 1978.

Sulisartut was closely aligned to Siumut in major political issues, supporting Siumut in elections to the European Parliament.

In the 1979 election, Sulisartut did not win a presence in the Landsting. The party also contested the 1979 Danish parliamentary election, obtaining 1,618 votes (which was insufficient to win any of the two Folketing seats allocated to Greenland).

In the elections to municipal councils, Sulisartut obtained 550 votes across Greenland, 156 in Nuuk, 114 in Ilulissat, 81 in Maniitsoq, 76 in Aasiaat, 60 in Qaqortoq, 33 in Narsaq, 23 in Qasigiannguit and seven in Uummannaq.

Ahead of the 1983 elections, Sulisartut merged into Inuit Ataqatigiit.
