= Saly =

Saly Portudal Sali
- Commune
- Location within Senegal
- Coordinates: 14°26′18″N 17°0′45″W
- Country: Senegal
- Region: Thiès
- Department: M'bour

Area
  - Commune: 14.29 km^{2} (5.52 sq mi)
- Elevation: 14 m (46 ft)

Population (2023 census)
  - Commune: 41,811
  - Density: 2,926/km^{2} (7,578/sq mi)

Saly (also called Sali or Saly Portudal) is a seaside resort and urban commune in Thiès Region on the Petite Côte of Senegal, south of Dakar. It is a major tourist destination in Senegal.

== History ==
Saly was originally a Portuguese trading post known as Porto de Ale, which became Portudal, and later Sali Portudal. It hosted Dutch merchants as well as the Portuguese by at least the late 16th century.

On February 24, 1984, the resort was created on a previously unoccupied tract of land near the former trading post. It was about this time that tourism began to take off in Senegal.

== Administration ==
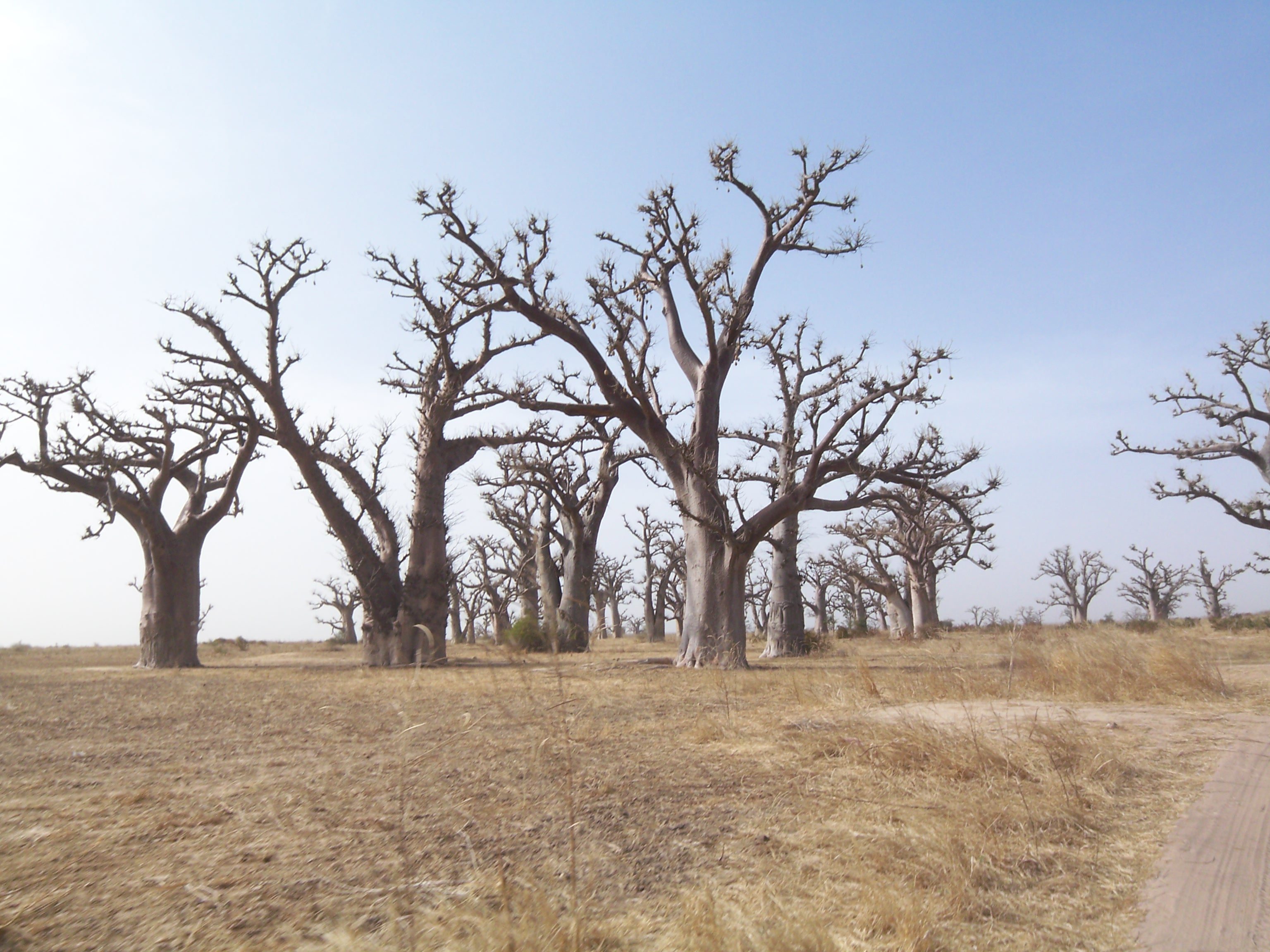
Baobab trees, Adansonia digitata, in the Sahel sub-Saharan savanna of Saly

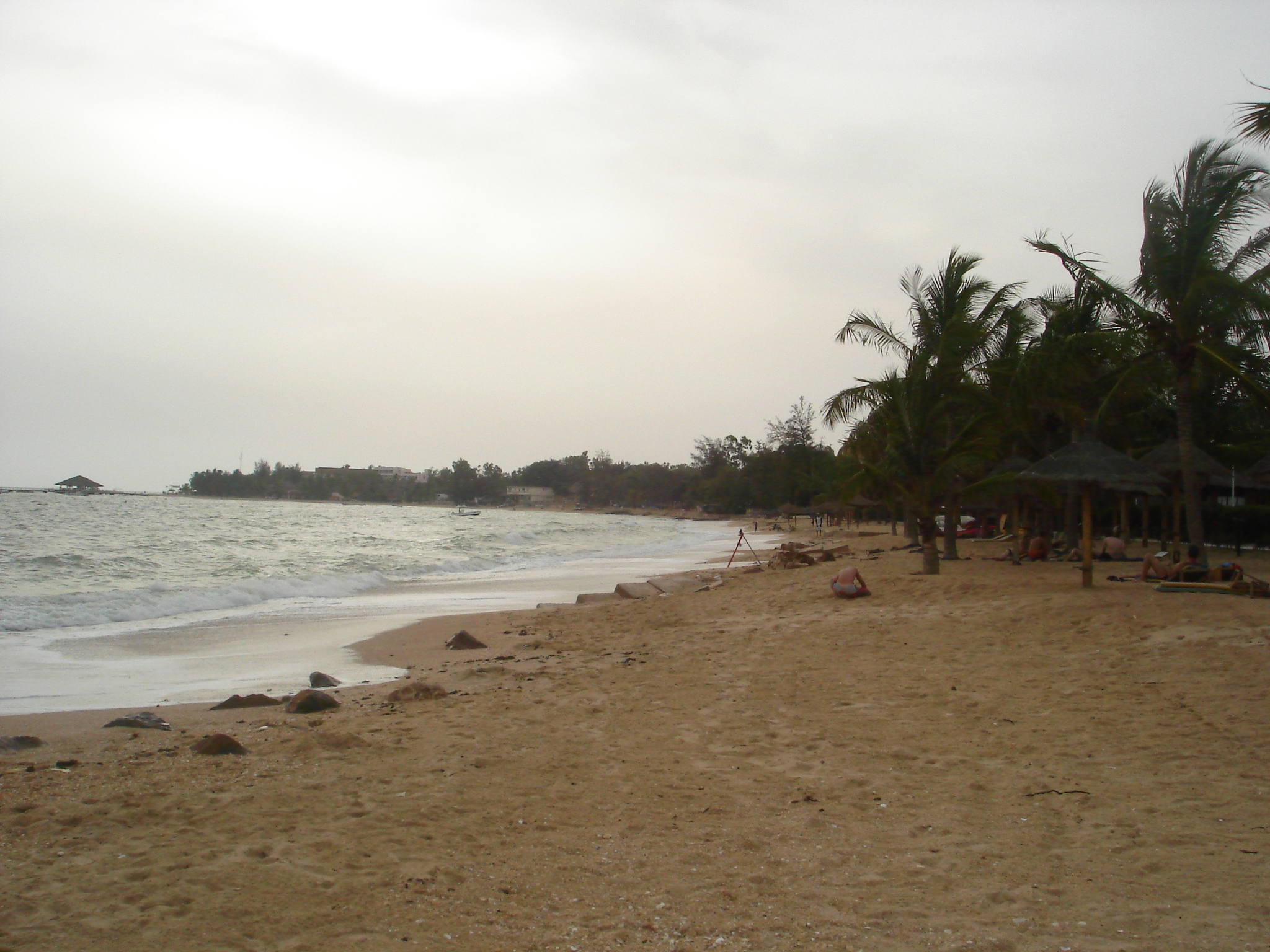
Sandy beach lined with coconut palm trees

Saly is part of M'bour, Thiès.

== Flora ==
The resort is located on a sandy beach lined with coconut palm trees.

== Population ==
The population is difficult to quantify because of the constant stream of tourists in and out of the area as well as the number of temporary residents. It has been suggested that an average of 20,000 people live in the area at any given time. The resident population was counted at 41,811 in the 2023 census.

== Economy ==
Saly's economy relies almost entirely on tourism. Hotel complexes, nightclubs, bars, restaurants, shops, water sports, real estate agencies all compete for the business of wealthy visitors from other countries.

Seminars and symposiums are often held in Saly.

== Social problems ==
The rapid development of mass tourism in a relatively poor country has had some negative consequences, such as petty crime, prostitution, pedophilia, and the spread of AIDS and other sexually transmitted diseases.

For a long time, these social problems were not discussed publicly so that the resort's reputation would not be tarnished. An observatory for the protection of children against abuse and sexual exploitation called Avenir de l'Enfant (The Child's Future) was created in M'bour by a Senegalese non-governmental organization in 2002.

In 2003, M6, a French television channel, broadcast a report focusing on Saly as part of the show Ça me révolte, meaning "That Disgusts Me". The show had hitherto focussed mainly on sex tourism in Asia.

== Education ==
The Lycée Français Jacques Prévert, a French international school, is in Saly.

== Bibliography ==
- A. K. Diagne (2001). "Impacts of Coastal Tourism Development and Sustainability: A Geographical Case Study of Sali in the Senegalese Petite Cote". Geographical Review of Japan. 74 (1): 62–77.
- Guy Thilmans (1968). "Sur l'existence, fin XVIe siècle, de comptoirs néerlandais à Joal et Portudal". Notes Africaines (in French) (117). Sénégal: 17–18.
- Effets du projet Sali sur l'économie du Sénégal (in French). Dakar. 1973. p. 75.
- (in French) L'Observateur
