= Party of Labour of Burkina =

- Secretary-General: Oumarou Clément Ouédraogo
- Founded: 1990
- Dissolved: February 1996
- Split from: Organization for Popular Democracy - Labour Movement
- Merged into: Party for Democracy and Progress
- Ideology: Communism; Marxism-Leninism

The Party of Labour of Burkina (French: Parti du Travail du Burkina, PTB) was a political party in Burkina Faso.

PTB was founded on December 23, 1990 by Clément Oumarou Ouédraogo, who became the general secretary of the party. Ouédraogo had been expelled from the Popular Front and the Organization for Popular Democracy - Labour Movement (ODP-MT), organizations of which he had been the general secretary, by Blaise Compaoré in April 1990. PTB was registered on April 4, 1991. PTB was a Marxist-Leninist party.

Ouédraogo was killed on December 9, 1991. After the death of Ouédraogo, the Second Plenum of the PTB Central Committee elected Alain Nidaoua Sawadogo as the new party leader. PTB merged with the Party for Democracy and Progress on February 23, 1996.
