= Petite Côte =

Coastal region in Senegal

Coordinates: 15.000°N 17.000°W

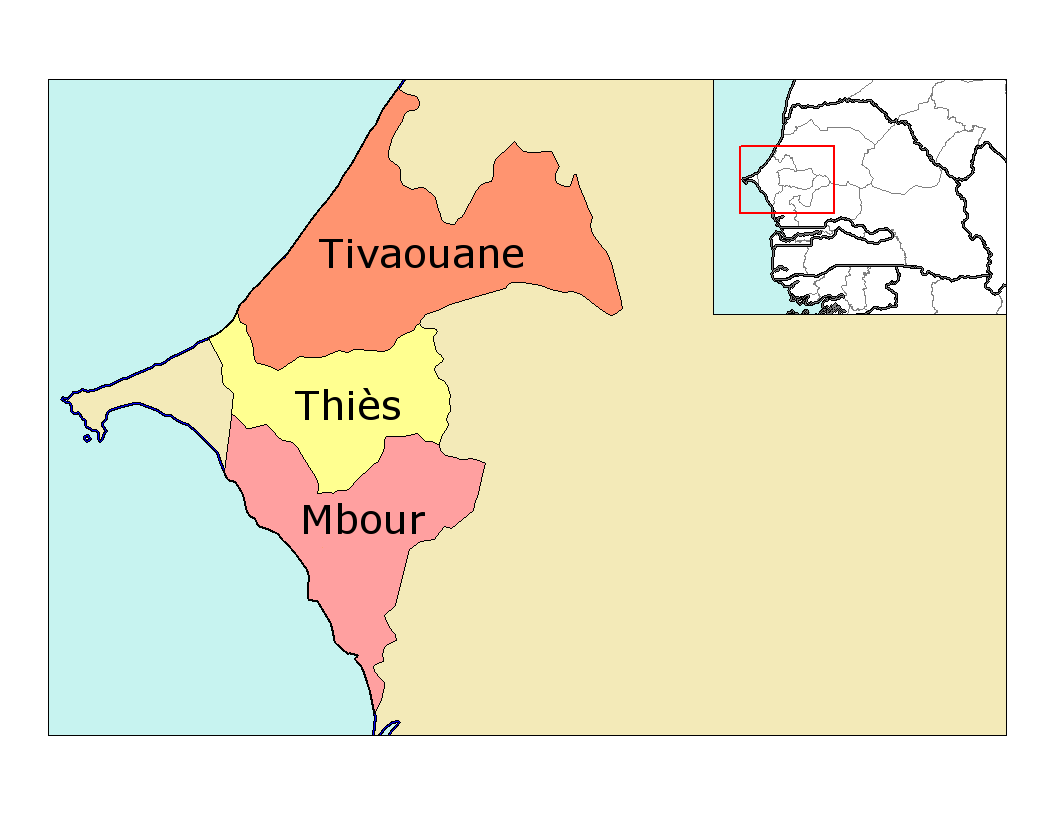
The Petite Cote starts from the Cap-Vert peninsula (west), running south along M'bour department to the Saloum Delta.

The Petite Côte (French for 'small coast') is a stretch of coast in Senegal, running south from the Cap-Vert peninsula to the Saloum Delta, near the border with the Gambia. The northern section near Dakar contains seaside resorts such as Saly Portudal, Rufisque, Nianing and Popenguine-Ndayane. The entire coast is part of the city of M'Bour, with fishing villages, such as Toubab Dialaw, Joal-Fadiout, Palmarin and Djiffer.

== History ==
During the late fifteenth and early sixteenth centuries, Portuguese emigrants known as lançados formed communities along Petite Côte in the region of Senegambia. Some were Jews fleeing the Portuguese Inquisition, who married African women and formed local families. During the early sixteenth century these Luso-Africans had established trading centers in Petite Côte and elsewhere along coastal West Africa. Luso-Africans descended from continental Africans, Portuguese settlers, and Cape Verdeans, developing a culture that mixed both African and European cultures. Lançado communities in Senegambia maintained close economic ties with Portugal and Cape Verde. Offspring of Lançado men and African women were known as filhos de terra and were generally considered to be "Portuguese".

== See also ==
- History of the Jews in Senegal
- Portuguese Cape Verde
- Senegambia
