= Voltaic Labour Party =

Defunct centre-left political party in Upper Volta

Voltaic Labour Party Parti Travailliste Voltaïque
- Founder: François de Salles Kaboré
- Founded: 1970
- Banned: 1974
- Ideology: Centre-left

The Voltaic Labour Party (in French: Parti Travailliste Voltaïque), was a centre-left political party in Upper Volta. PTV contested the 1970 elections, without any significant result.

PTV functioned as the political branch of the Voltaic Organization of Free Trade Unions (OVSL).
