= Zimbabwe Labour Party =

Political party in Zimbabwe

Zimbabwe Labour Party is a political party in Zimbabwe. It was founded in 1995. The party president is Langton Machoko. ZLP publishes Chimoto.
