= Labour Party of Sine Saloum =

Political party in Senegal

Labour Party of Sine Saloum (in French: Parti travailliste du Sine Saloum) was a political party in Sine-Saloum, Senegal. It existed around 1960.
