= Independent Labor Party =

Political party in Burundi

The Independent Labor Party (PIT) is a small, predominantly ethnic Tutsi political party in Burundi.

It was founded in 1993.
