= Saloum Delta National Park =

UNESCO World Heritage Site
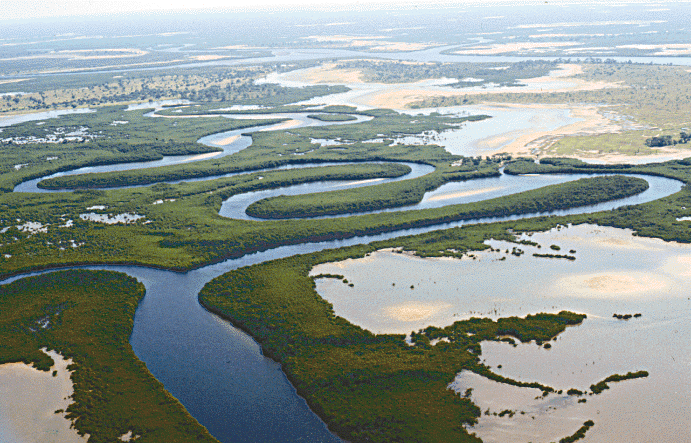
- Saloum Delta

- Location within Senegal
- Location: Senegal
- Part of: Saloum Delta
- Criteria: Cultural: (iii)(iv)(v)
- Reference: 1359
- Inscription: 2011 (35th Session)
- Coordinates: 13°42′N 16°38′W

Ramsar Wetland
- Official name: Parc national du Delta du Saloum
- Designated: 3 April 1984; 42 years ago
- Reference no.: 288

Saloum Delta National Park or Parc National du Delta du Saloum in Senegal, is a 760-square-kilometre (190,000-acre) national park. Established in 1976, it is situated within the Saloum Delta at the juncture of the Saloum River and the North Atlantic.

The park, which forms part of a UNESCO World Heritage Site and a Ramsar Convention site, lies within a 1,800 km^{2} (440,000-acre) biosphere reserve. Water comprises 610 km^{2} (150,000 acres) of the park, intertidal mangroves and saltwater vegetation cover 70 km^{2} (17,000 acres), and savannah and forest cover 80 km^{2} (20,000 acres). It lies on the East Atlantic Flyway. The bird species that breed or winter in the area include royal tern, greater flamingo, Eurasian spoonbill, curlew sandpiper, ruddy turnstone, and little stint.

This region represents an important synergy between nature with extensive biodiversity and the way of human development, which is still present, albeit fragile. Sustainable shellfish farming is highly developed here and is a very important source of food and export revenue for the local community and Senegal in general.

The Saloum Delta is about 100 km (62 mi) south of the Senegalese capital, Dakar.

== Climate change ==
In 2022, the IPCC Sixth Assessment Report included Saloum Delta National Park in the list of African natural heritage sites which would be threatened by flooding and coastal erosion by the end of the century, but only if climate change followed RCP 8.5, which is the scenario of high and continually increasing greenhouse gas emissions associated with the warming of over 4 °C., and is no longer considered very likely. The other, more plausible scenarios result in lower warming levels and consequently lower sea level rise: yet, sea levels would continue to increase for about 10,000 years under all of them. Even if the warming is limited to 1.5 °C, global sea level rise is still expected to exceed 2–3 m (7–10 ft) after 2000 years (and higher warming levels will see larger increases by then), consequently exceeding 2100 levels of sea level rise under RCP 8.5 (~0.75 m (2 ft) with a range of 0.5–1 m (2–3 ft)) well before the year 4000.

== See also ==
- Sine River
- Sine-Saloum
