= National Labour Party (Jamaica) =

The National Labour Party was a political party in Jamaica, founded by Ken Hill. Hill had been expelled from the People's National Party in 1952, accused of having advocated communism. The NLP ran three candidates in the 1955 general election; Ken Hill contested Kingston Western, getting 3,262 votes (21.91%, trailing behind the PNP and JLP candidates). Frank Hill contested the Saint Andrew Central seat, getting 784 votes (3.24%). W. M. Grubb finished second in the Hanover Eastern seat, getting 1,958 votes (30.31%).

The NLP disappeared in the 1960s.
