= Saloum Delta =

UNESCO World Heritage Site
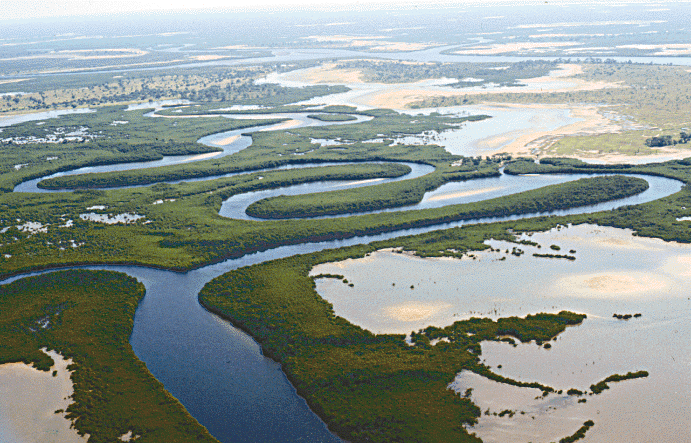

- Location within Senegal
- Location: Senegal
- Criteria: Cultural: (iii), (iv), (v)
- Reference: 1359
- Inscription: 2011 (35th Session)
- Area: 145,811 ha (360,310 acres)
- Buffer zone: 78,842 ha (194,820 acres)
- Coordinates: 13°50′7″N 16°29′55″W

Ramsar Wetland
- Official name: Parc national du Delta du Saloum
- Designated: 3 April 1984
- Reference no.: 288

Saloum Delta or Sine-Saloum Delta is a river delta in Senegal at the mouth of the Saloum River where it flows into the North Atlantic Ocean. The delta covers 180,000 hectares. It extends 72.5 kilometers along the coastline and 35 kilometers inland.

In 2011, a 145,811-hectare portion of the delta was designated a UNESCO World Heritage Site. The site contains "brackish channels encompassing over 200 islands and islets, mangrove forest, an Atlantic marine environment, and dry forest." Saloum Delta National Park covers 76,000 hectares of the delta.

The bird species that breed or winter in the area include royal tern, greater flamingo, Eurasian spoonbill, goliath heron, curlew sandpiper, ruddy turnstone, and little stint. Aside from being a valued breeding ground for birds, the delta contains 218 shellfish mounds and artefacts unearthed at some 28 of the burial grounds have provided an important insight into the history of human occupation in the area.

In 2008, the Saloum Delta and Niumi National Park in the neighboring Gambia were declared part of the "Niumi-Saloum" Transboundary Ramsar Site.

The 2021 crime-horror thriller movie Saloum by Jean Luc Herbulot, which is set in the Saloum delta, is named after it.
