= Diembéring (rural community) =

Rural community in Cabrousse, Senegal

Diembéring (or Djembering) is a rural community of Senegal. It is located in the Cabrousse Arrondissement, the Oussouye Department, the Ziguinchor, in Casamance. In 1988, there were 8,932 people living within the community. It is situated in the west of the country along the Atlantic coast.

== Geography ==
There are several villages in Diembéring, including:

- Boucott-Diembéring
- Boucotte Diola
- Cachouane
- Cap Skirring
- Carabane
- Diembéring
- Etama
- Etoune
- Haloudia
- Houdiabousse
- Kabrousse
- Kadiakaye
- Kaëngha
- Nialou
- Niéré
- Nikine
