= Diatta =

Diatta may refer to:

== People ==
- Adama Diatta (born 1988), male freestyle wrestler from Senegal
- Alassane Diatta (born 2005), Senegalese footballer
- Aline Sitoe Diatta (1920–1944), Senegalese hero of the resistance to French Colonialism
- Astou Ndiaye-Diatta (born 1973), retired Senegalese women's basketball player
- Emile Diatta, Senegalese politician
- Krépin Diatta (born 1999), Senegalese footballer
- Lamine Diatta (born 1975), Senegalese footballer

== Places in Senegal ==
- Cité Aline Sitoe Diatta, neighborhood in west central Dakar
- Stade Aline Sitoe Diatta, multi-use stadium in Ziguinchor
