= Diembéring =

Diembéring Diembering, Diembéreng, Djiwat, Guimbering, Diébéring, Diebering, Djembering
- City
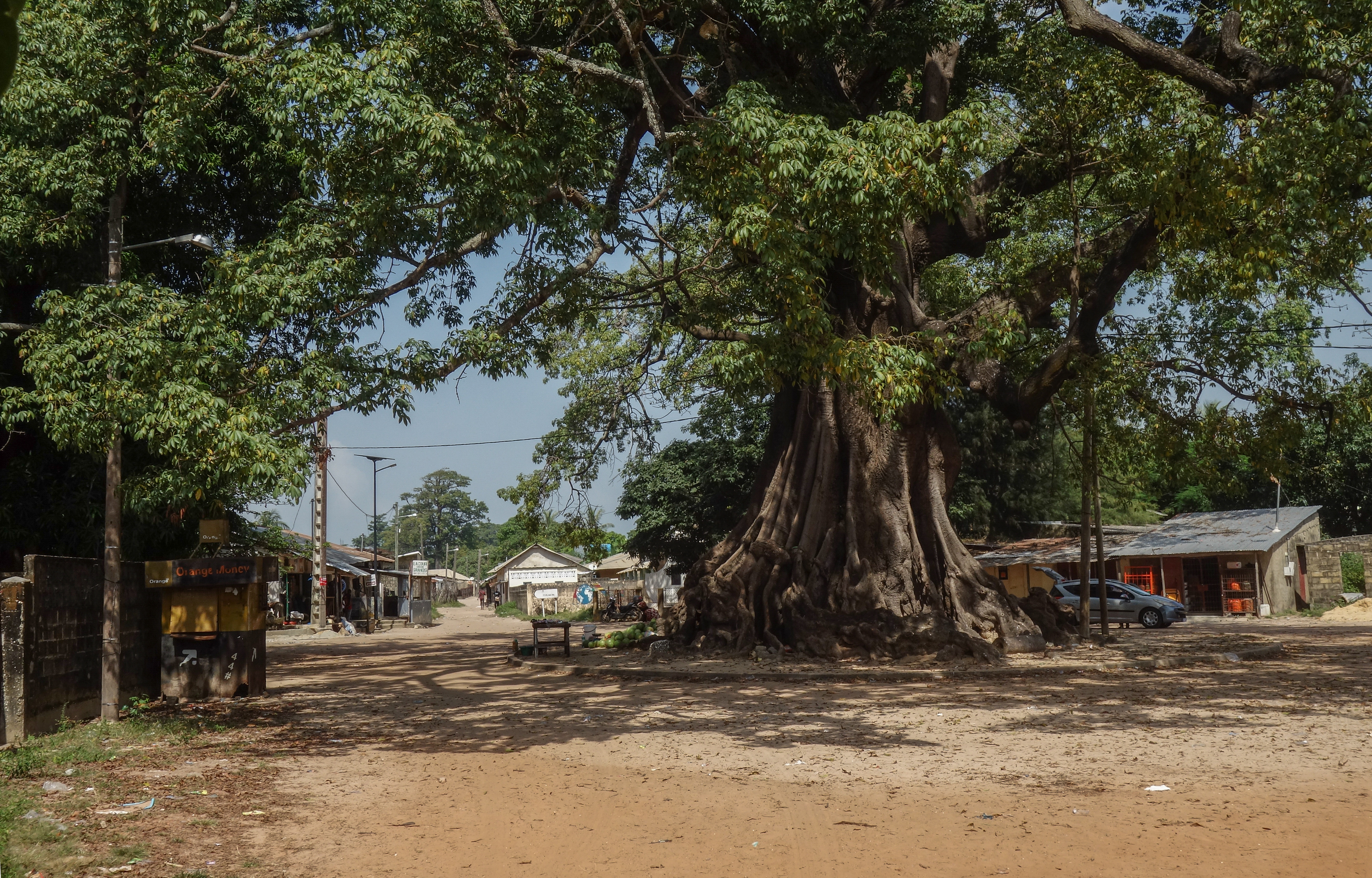
- Kapok tree at the entrance of Diembéring

- Location in Senegal
- Coordinates: 12°28′8″N 16°46′50″W
- Country: Senegal
- Region: Ziguinchor
- Department: Oussouye
- Arrondissement: Cabrousse

Diembéring (also called Diembering, Diembéreng, Djiwat, Guimbering, Diébéring, Diebering, or Djembering) is a village in Senegal in the rural community of the same name. It is located in Cabrousse, Oussouye, Ziguinchor, Casamance, approximately 10 km north of Cap Skirring and 60 km from Ziguinchor.

It is home to the Diembéring dialect of the Kwatay language.

== History ==
Initially, Diembéring was a fishing village. It is still so today, however tourism has opened up other possibilities.

== Administration ==
Diembéring is the capital of the rural district (communauté rurale) of the same name. Within the district are the other villages of :

- Boucotte Diola
- Boucotte Wolof
- Bouyouye
- Cachouane
- Cap Skirring
- Ehidje
- Gnikine
- Kabrousse
- Karabane
- Ourong
- Sifoca
- Wendaye

== Geography ==
The nearest localities are Koudioundou, Nikine, Bouyouye, Cachouane, Boucotte Wolof, and Mossor.

=== Physical geography ===
Diembéring was built on sand dunes, among palms and towering trees of the Malvaceae family (likely Ceiba pentandra, one of many species widely called, ambiguously, 'kapok trees'). (Note: From the same family, species of the Bombax genus, including Bombax costatum, occur in West Africa and are also known as kapok trees in English, and locally by the French common-names fromager rouge 'red-(flowered) cheese-maker' or faux-kapokier 'false-kapok'. The common names of C. pentandra are fromager and kapokier)

=== Population ===
Diembéring is one of the few places where people speak Kuwaataay, a dialect of Jola.

=== Economy ===
The beaches of this coastal village are popular with tourists. There is a mosque in the area, as well as a church where a Jola mass is sung each Sunday. A maternity hospital is run by a Spanish order of nuns.

== Notes ==
=== Bibliography ===
- Stephen Payne (1992). "Une grammaire pratique avec phonologie et dictionnaire de kwatay (parler du village de Diémbéring, Basse Casamance, Sénégal)". Cahiers de Recherche Linguistique (in French). Dakar: Société internationale de linguistique (SIL): 134.
- Louis-Vincent Thomas (October 1967). "Veillée Djiwat". Notes africaines (in French) (116): 105–109.
