= Cachouane =

Cachouane Cachiouane, Kachiouane
- Town
- Location within Senegal
- Coordinates: 12°30′14″N 16°42′52″W
- Country: Senegal
- Region: Ziguinchor
- Department: Oussouye
- Elevation: 1 m (3.3 ft)

Population
  - Total: 297

Cachouane (also called Cachiouane and Kachiouane) is a town in Basse Casamance, southern Senegal, located in the mouth of the Casamance River, south of the island of Carabane.

== History ==
A conference promoting culture, peace, and non-violence was held in Cachouane on May 18, 2002.

== Administration ==
The village is part of the rural community of Diembéring, Oussouye, Ziguinchor.

== Geography ==
The nearest towns to Cachouane are Diembéring, Nikine, Carabane, Windaye, Sifoca, Bouyouye, and Ehidje.

=== Geology ===
Cachouane is located on the edge of a saltwater stream.

=== Population ===
According to PEPAM (Water and Sanitation Program for the Millennium), there are 297 people and 41 households in Cachouane.

Most of the population is Muslim, but some are Christian.

=== Economy ===
Cachouane is a peninsula that is accessible both by road from Diembéring and by canoe from Elinkine.

Seafood, rice, and medicinal plants are the major products of the village. Cachouane's economy also benefits from tourism.

The village lacks a sufficient quantity of fresh water. The soil is therefore threatened by erosion and a progressive salinization. A dam is being constructed to combat these problems.

The village has a primary school, a maternity hospital, a health post, and a youth centre which is under construction.
