= Loudia Ouolof Arrondissement =

- Arrondissement
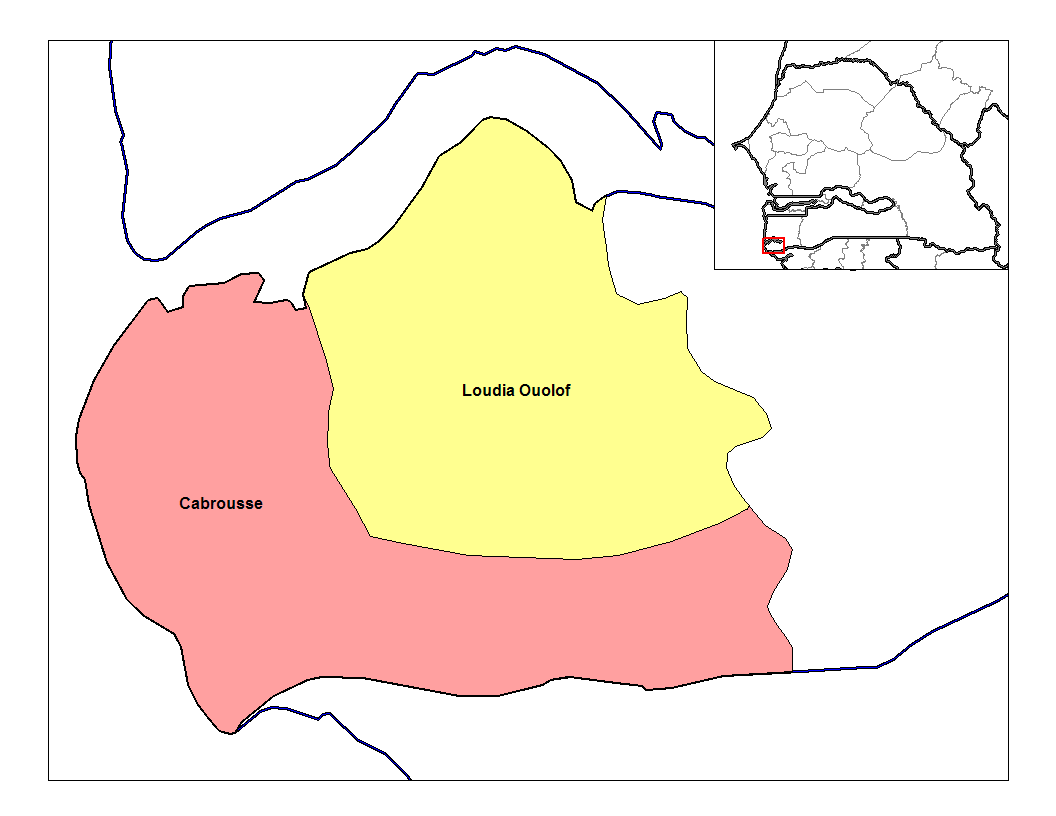
- Location in the Oussouye Department
- Country: Senegal
- Region: Ziguinchor Region
- Department: Oussouye Department

Area
  - Total: 517 km^{2} (200 sq mi)

Population (2013 census)
  - Total: 19,588
  - Density: 37.9/km^{2} (98.1/sq mi)
- Time zone: UTC±00:00 (GMT)

Loudia Ouolof Arrondissement is an arrondissement of the Oussouye Department in the Ziguinchor Region of Senegal.

== Subdivisions ==
The arrondissement is divided administratively into 2 rural communities and in turn into villages.

| Mlomp CR | Oukout CR |
|---|---|
| 19 villages : Baguigui; Bouhimban; Ebrouway; Efissao; Elinkine; Eloudia; Haer; Hassuka; Jikomol; Jiromait; Kadjifolong; Kafone; Kagnao; Loudia Ouoloff; Ouyoho; Ponta (Petite Ponta); Sam Sam; Samatit; Santhiaba | 19 villages : Batinière; Boukitingho; Carounate; Diakène Diola; Diakène Ouolof; Diantene; Djivente; Edioungou; Eloubaline; Emaye; Kahinda; Niambalang; Oukout Eteilo; Oukout Madiop; Senghalène; Siganar Boulouf; Siganar Houssal; Siganar Katakal; Siganar Kaboumkout |
