= Boucotte Diola =

- Interactive map of Boucotte Diola
- Coordinates: 12.414°N 16.748°W
- Country: Senegal
- Region: Ziguinchor
- Department: Oussouye
- Arrondissement: Kabrousse
- Elevation: 15 m (49 ft)

Population (2002)
  - Total: 197
- Time zone: UTC+0 (GMT)

Boucotte Diola is a settlement in Senegal. At the time of the last census, there were 197 inhabitants, 27 households, and no modern well. The inhabitants speak the Kwatay language, one of the Jola languages.

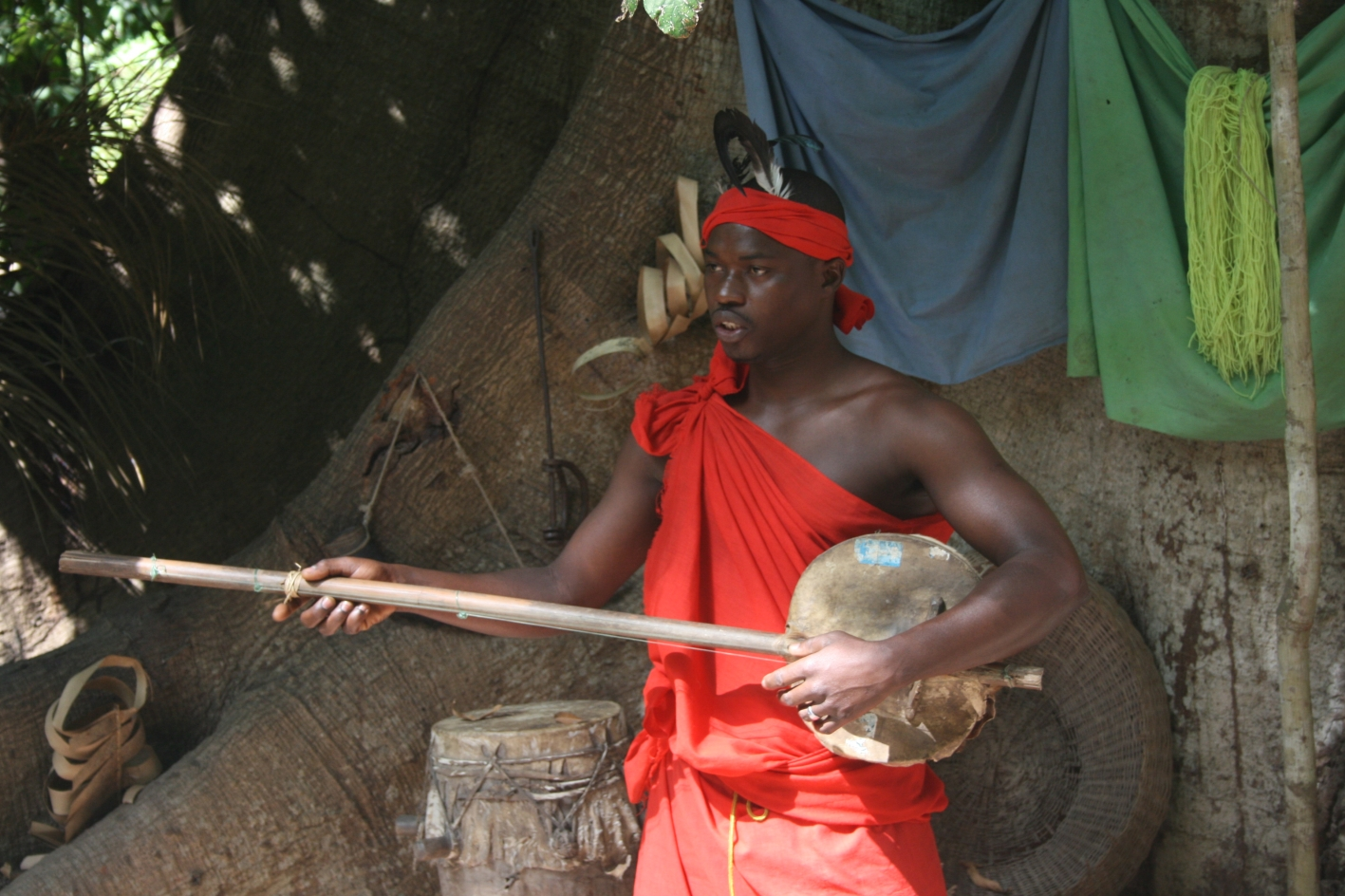
Museum guide in Boucotte playing the ekonting

It hosts the Boucotte Sangawatt Museum, an open-air museum dedicated to the culture of the Jola people. The museum preserves, amongst other things, musical traditions, hunting and fishing technologies, handicrafts, the traditional cultivation of African rice (a separate species from the common Asian rice), and the making of bounouk, a palm wine, of which it gives out samples to guests.
