= Cabrousse Arrondissement =

- Arrondissement
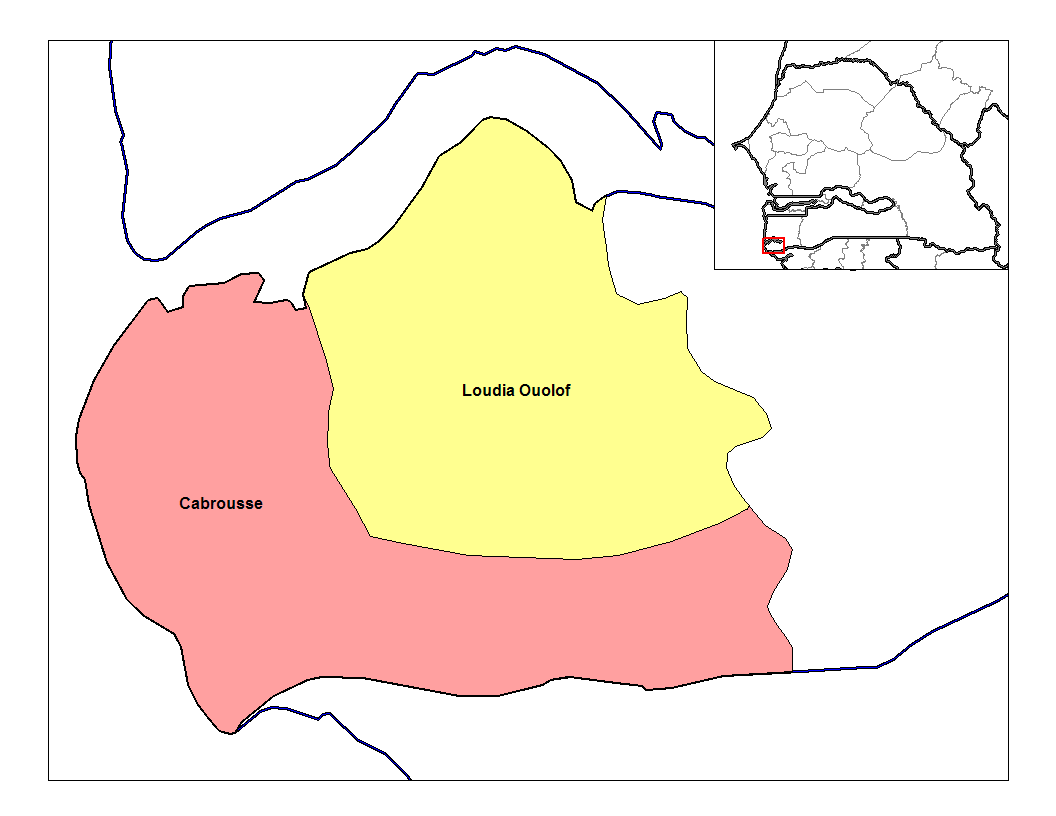
- Location in the Oussouye Department
- Country: Senegal
- Region: Ziguinchor Region
- Department: Oussouye Department

Area
  - Total: 374 km^{2} (144 sq mi)

Population (2013 census)
  - Total: 23,916
  - Density: 63.9/km^{2} (166/sq mi)
- Time zone: UTC±00:00 (GMT)

Cabrousse Arrondissement is an arrondissement of the Oussouye Department in the Ziguinchor Region of Senegal.

== Subdivisions ==
The arrondissement is divided administratively into 2 rural communities and in turn into villages.

Communautés rurales :

Diembéring CR	Santhiaba Manjacque CR
23 Villages : Boucott-Diembéring; Boucott Diola; Bouyouye ?; Cachouane; Cap Skirring; Carabane (île); Diembéring; Ehidj (île) ?; Etama; Etoune; Haloudia; Houdiabousse; Kabrousse; Kadiakaye; Kaëngha; Mossor ?; Nialou; Niéré; Nikine ?; Ourong (île) ?; Sifoca (île) ?; Wendaye (île) ?	16 Villages : Djirack; Effoc-Balandiate; Effoc-Eghine; Effoc-Ehneting; Effoc-Kakounoume; Ering; Essaout; Essoukoudiack; Kahéme; Santhiaba Manjacque; Youtou-Bouhéme; Youtou-Bringo; Youtou-Djibonker; Youtou-Essoukaye; Youtou-Kagar; Youtou-kamokindo
