= King of Oussouye =

Religious, spiritual and traditional leader of the Jola people

The King of Oussouye is a religious, spiritual and traditional leader of the Jola people who follow their traditional religion. The Jolas believe in a god called Ata Emit. The King is an intermediary between God and men. The king is described as a "collaborator of God who receives offerings to pray and intercede with the spirits".

The King of Oussouye is responsible for ensuring peace and social cohesion. In case of conflict, he is consulted and his role is to reconcile the parties. The enthronement of the current king Sibulumbai Diedhiou in 2000 brought peace in parts of Oussouye Department which was engulfed in violence due to the ongoing Casamance conflict.

The King also ensures that each of his people has food, distributing the rice from the royal fields, cultivated by the surrounding villagers. This rice is also used for the meal of the big annual festival called Houmabeul. This festival is held at the end of the winter, in September or early October 3.

The current king of Oussouye is Sibilumbaï Diedhiou (Olivier Diedhiou before his enthronement). He was inducted on January 17, 2000, 16 years after the death of his predecessor Sibacouyane Diabone. The king is appointed by the elders. He comes from one of the three main families of Oussouye. The King resides in the sacred wood of the commune of Oussouye.

== List of Kings ==
- January 17, 2000 onwards: Sibilumbaï Diedhiou
- 1984 - January 17, 2000: Position vacant
- 1958 - 1984: Sibacouyane Diabone
- 1932-1958 - Sihang-Ebil Sambou
- 1903-1932 Sibilouyane Diedhiou
- 1861- 1903 Sihalebe
