= Batinière =

- Location in Senegal
- Coordinates: 12°30′3″N 16°28′59″W
- Country: Senegal
- Region: Ziguinchor
- Department: Oussouye
- Arrondissement: Loudia Ouolof
- Rural community: Oukout

Population (2002)
  - Total: 98
- Time zone: UTC+0 (GMT)

Batinière is a settlement in the Oussouye Department of the Ziguinchor Region in south-west Senegal. In 2002 its population was recorded as 98 people in 14 households.
