= Kagnout =

Kagnout Cagnout, Cagnut
- Village
- Location within Senegal
- Coordinates: 12°32′56″N 16°37′40″W
- Country: Senegal
- Region: Ziguinchor
- Department: Oussouye
- Elevation: 31 m (102 ft)

Kagnout (also called Cagnout or Cagnut) is a village in Casamance, Senegal. It is located near the left bank of the estuary of the Casamance River. It is part of the rural community of Mlomp, in the district of Loudia Ouoloff, the department of Oussouye and the region of Ziguinchor. Administratively, it is made up of three official villages: Cagnoute Bouhibane, Cagnoute Ebrouaye and Cagnoute Houyoho.

== History ==
On March 25, 1851, the leaders of Kagnout permanently ceded the island of Carabane to France.

== Administration ==
The village is part of the rural community of Mlomp in Oussouye, Ziguinchor.

== Geography ==
The nearest towns are Carabane, Hitou, Kabounkoute, Niomoune, Loudia Diola, Mlomp, and Samatit.

== Bibliography ==
- Muriel Scibilia (2003). La Casamance ouvre ses cases. Tourisme au Sénégal (in French). L’Harmattan. p. 174. ISBN 2-85802-676-9.
- Louis-Vincent Thomas (1958). Les Diola. Essai d’analyse fonctionnelle sur une population de Basse-Casamance (in French). Dakar: IFAN, Université de Dakar. p. 821.
