= Musée de la Culture Diola =

Local museum in Mlomp, Senegal

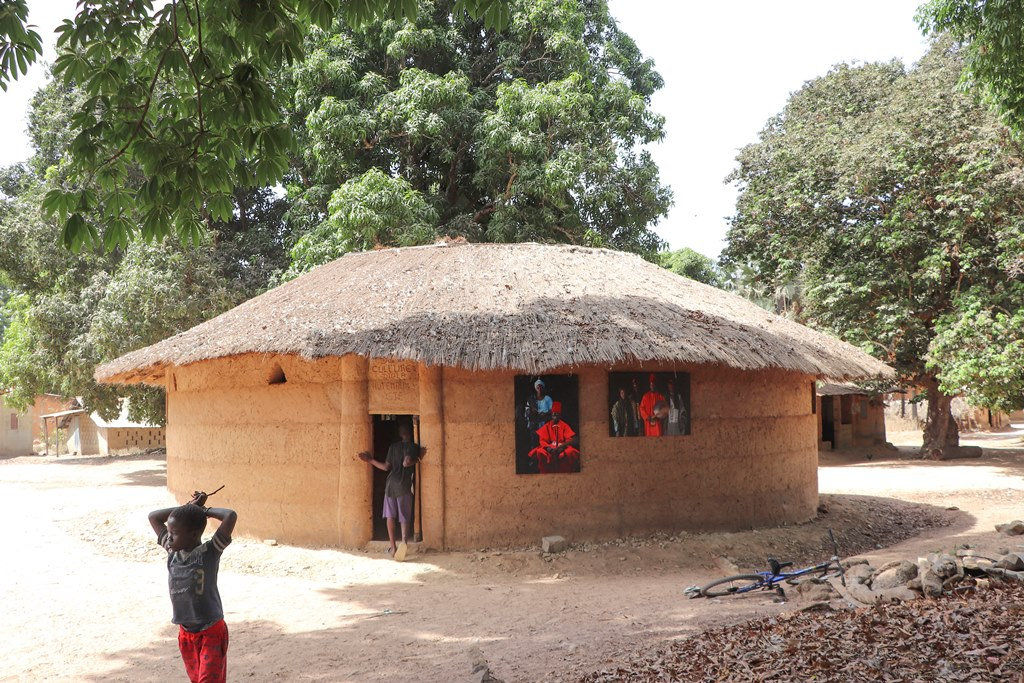
- Location: Mlomp, Senegal
- Coordinates: 12.5554°N 16.5872°W
- Type: Folk museum

The Musée de la Culture Diola (aka Musée de la Tradition Diola and Diola Museum) is a museum located in Mlomp, Casamance, Ziguinchor Region, Senegal.

The museum, a round-floor designed case à impluvium, houses an exhibition dedicated to animist Diola culture. It is located among tall kapok trees between Elinkine and Oussouye. A guide at the museum is there to explain some of the museum's objects.

== Collections ==
The collections include fetishes, baskets used as fish traps, gris-gris worn as amulets as protection against injury, hoops for climbing palm trees, pestle and mortar for making palm wine, and shields made of hippopotamus hide. There are also African musical instruments.

Among animists, an individual's life is linked to that of one or more protective fetishes. The museum exhibits four such fetishes, essential to the social organisation of the Diola community.

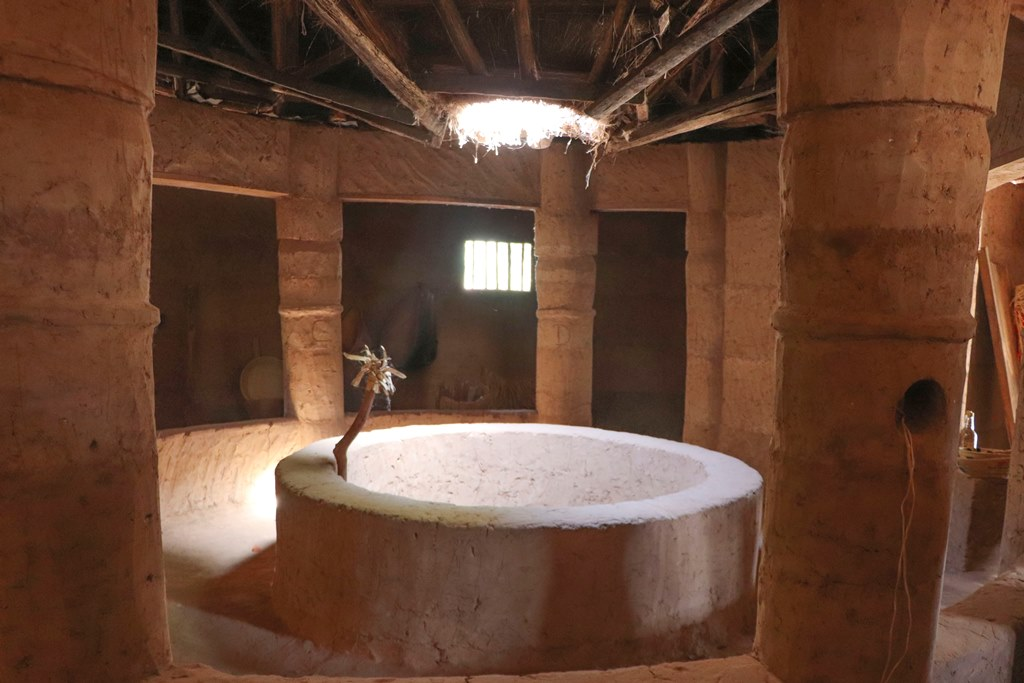
Impluvium

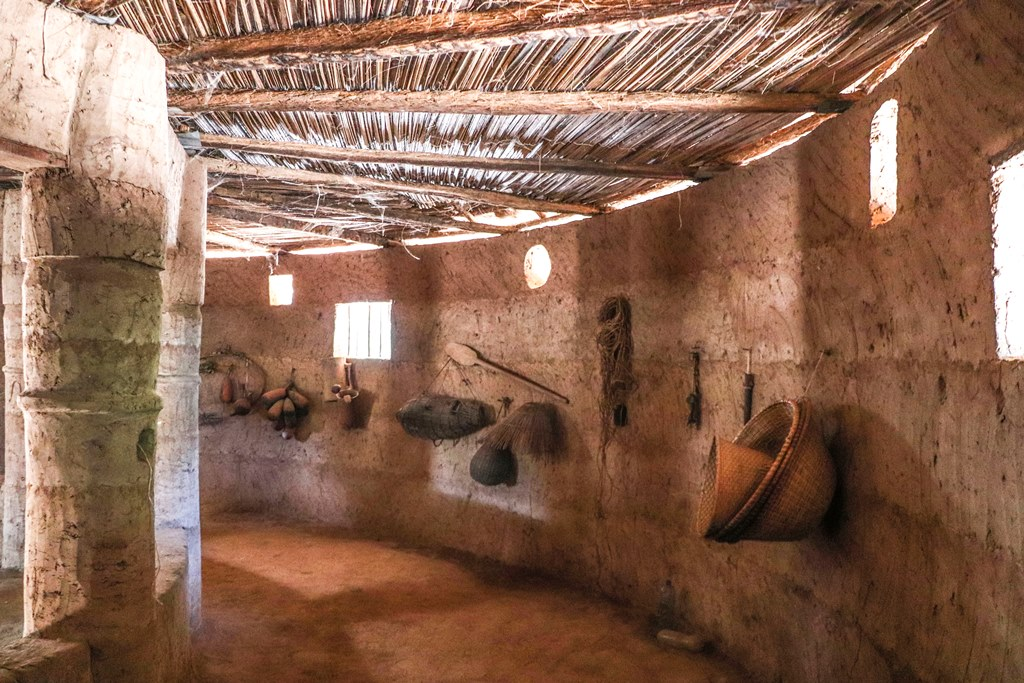
Tools for production

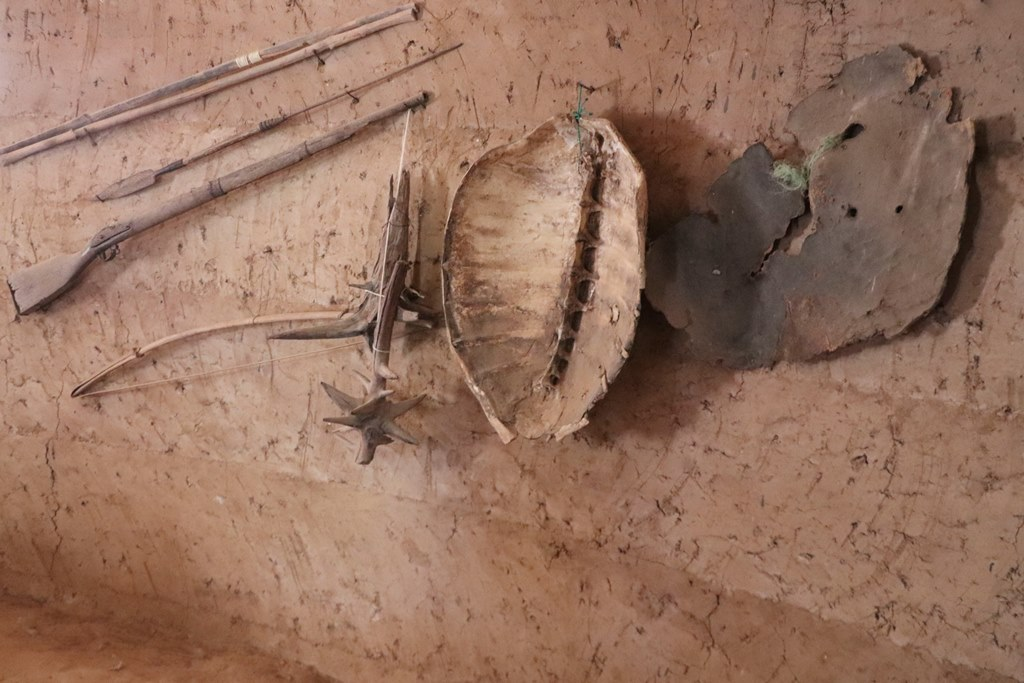
Sea turtle shell and hippopotamus skin

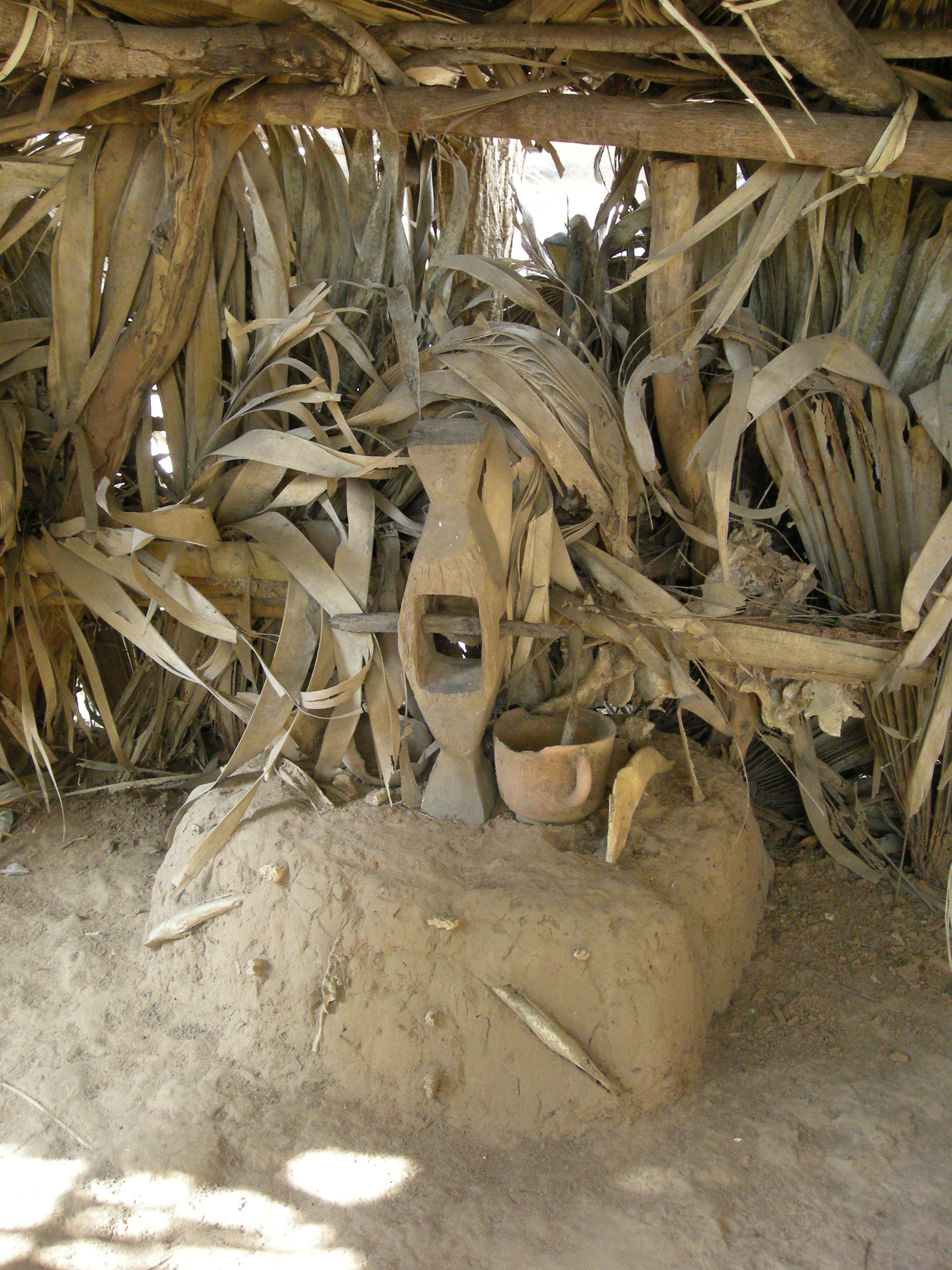
Fetish

== See also ==
- List of museums in Senegal
