= Baguigui =

- Location in Senegal
- Coordinates: 12°31′39″N 16°33′11″W
- Country: Senegal
- Region: Ziguinchor
- Department: Oussouye
- Arrondissement: Loudia Ouolof
- Rural community: Mlomp

Population (2002)
  - Total: 32
- Time zone: UTC+0 (GMT)

Baguigui or Badjigui is a settlement in the Oussouye Department of the Ziguinchor Region in south-west Senegal. At the 2002 census it had 32 inhabitants in 5 households.
