= Mlomp =

- Rural community and village
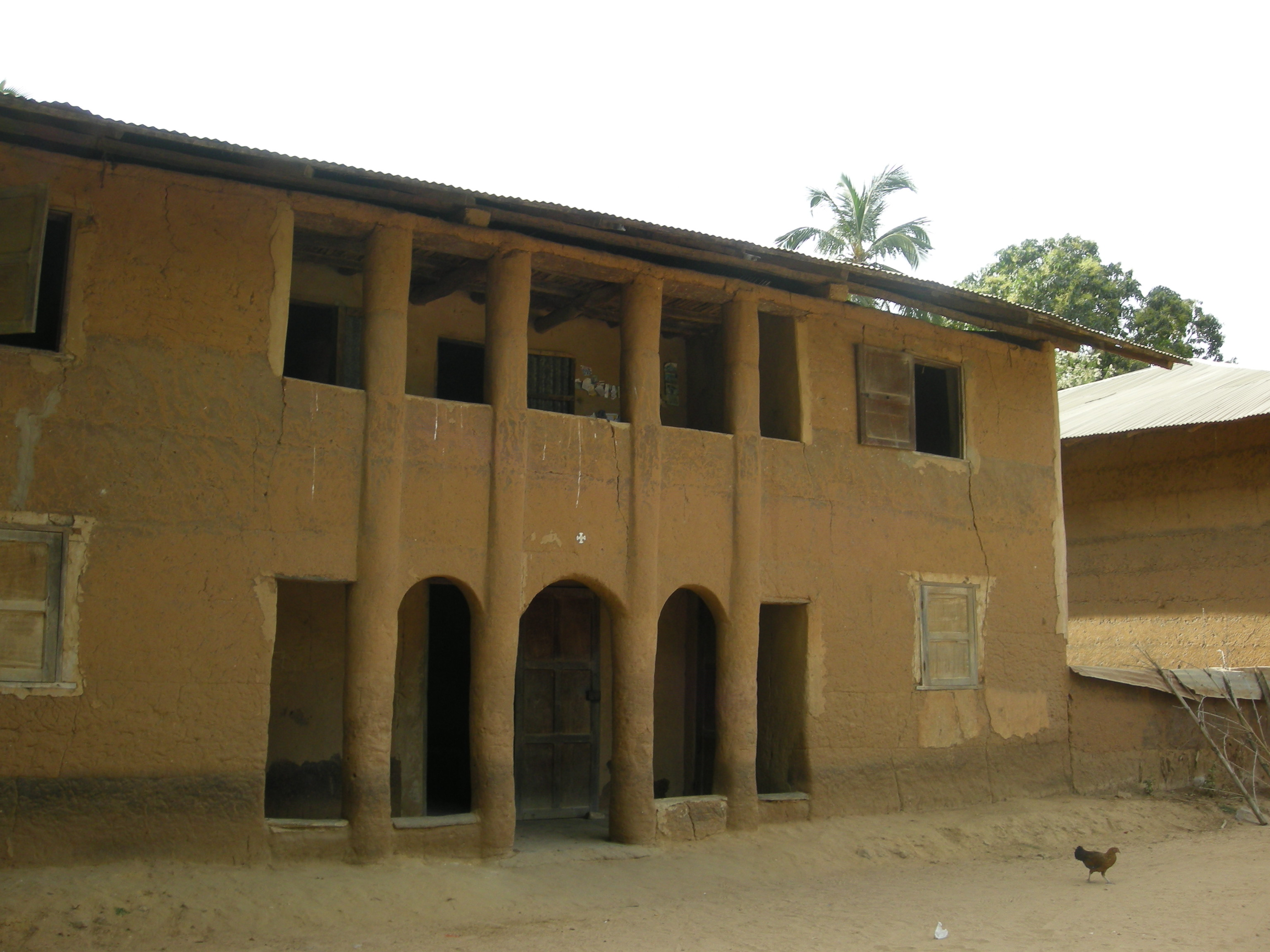
- Traditional mud house

- Location within Senegal
- Coordinates: 12°33′13″N 16°35′20″W
- Country: Senegal
- Region: Ziguinchor Region
- Department: Oussouye Department
- Elevation: 26 m (85 ft)

Population (2006)
  - Total: 8,500
- Time zone: UTC+0 (GMT)

Mlomp is a rural community and village in the Ziguinchor Region of Senegal in the Casamance, situated approximately 40 km (25 mi) south-west of Ziguinchor.

As of 2000, it had a population of 7,628, rising to around 8,500 in 2006. Most inhabitants are of Diola ethnicity and speaking the Diola language, and many also speak the Wolof language and French.

== Administration ==
The rural district (communauté rurale) of Mlomp belongs to the Loudia Ouolof Arrondissement, in the Oussouye Department of the Ziguinchor Region. Within the district are the villages of :

- Badjigui
- Cagnoute Bouhibane
- Cagnoute Ebrouaye
- Cagnoute Houyoho
- Djiromait
- Efissao
- Elinkine
- Kadjinolle Ebankine
- Kadjinolle Hassouka
- Kadjinolle Kadianka
- Kadjinolle Kafone
- Kadjinolle Kagnao
- Kadjinolle Sagheur
- Loudia Diola
- Loudia Ouoloff
- Mlomp Djibetene
- Mlomp Djicomol
- Mlomp Etebemaye
- Mlomp Haer
- Mlomp Kadjifolong
- Pointe Saint-Georges
- Sam Sam
- Samatit
- Santhiaba Ouolof

Mlomp has an elementary and secondary school, a dispensary, and a town hall.

== Geography ==
The localities closest to Mlomp are Djiromait, Elinkine, Kagnout, Karabane, Loudia Diola, Loudia Ouolof, Oussouye, Pointe Saint Georges, Samatit, Bouhimban.

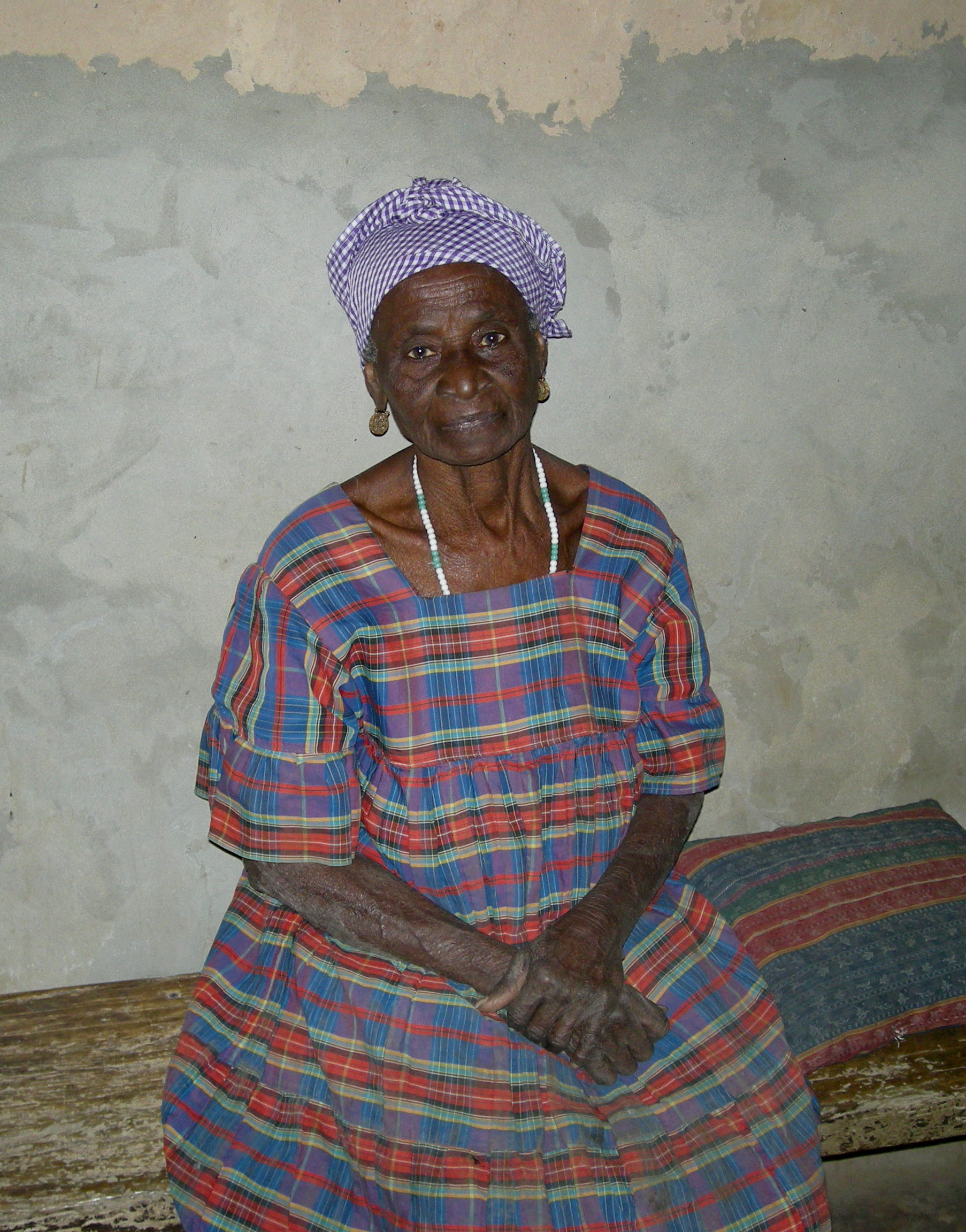
An elderly Mlomp woman

== Demographics ==
According to PEPAM, (Programme d'eau potable et d'assainissement du Millénaire), the commune of Mlomp has a population of 7,628 persons living in 1,062 individual households.

Among the 24 villages of the community, three bear the name of Mlomp. These include the village of Mlomp Djibetene (480 inhabitants), Mlomp Djicomol (993 inhabitants) and Mlomp Kadjifolong (843 inhabitants), Mlomp Haer, Mlomp Etebemaye. The population is mainly Christian (80%), but it also includes animists (19%) and Muslims (1%).

The Mlomp language takes the name of the area.

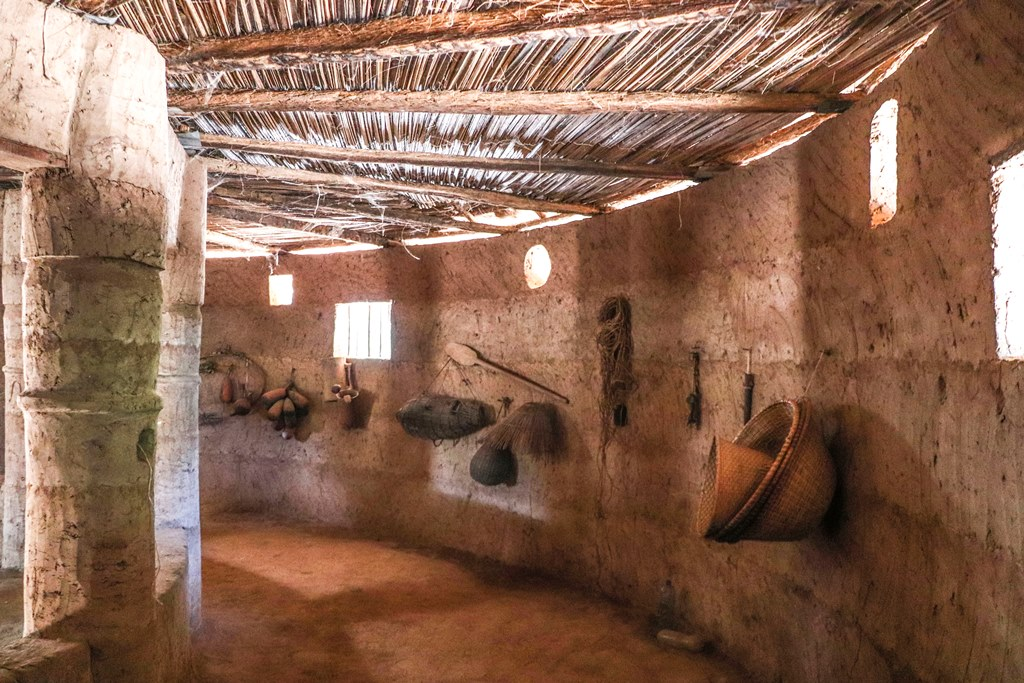
Musée de la Culture Diola

== Economy ==
Main products produced in Mlomp include rice, wines, honey, fruit and vegetables, baskets, tapestries, fish, and sea food.

== See also ==
- Musée de la Culture Diola
