= Boucott-Diembéring =

Coordinates: 12°24′59″N 16°45′02″W

- Village
- Interactive map of Boucott-Diembéring
- Country: Senegal
- Region: Ziguinchor
- Department: Oussouye

Boucott-Diembéring is a village in the rural community of Diembéring, Cabrousse, Oussouye, Ziguinchor, Casamance.
