= Musée Régional de Tambacounda =

Senegalese museum

The Musée Régional de Tambacounda is a museum located in Senegal.

== See also ==
- List of museums in Senegal
