= Musée Géologique Africain =

Museum in Senegal

The Musée Géologique Africain is a museum located in Senegal.

== See also ==
- List of museums in Senegal
