= Samatit =

- Village
- Location in Senegal
- Coordinates: 12°32′05″N 16°38′24″W
- Country: Senegal
- Region: Ziguinchor
- Department: Oussouye

Samatit is a village in the rural community of Mlomp, Loudia Ouoloff, Oussouye, Ziguinchor, Casamance.

== Geography ==
The nearest towns are Carabane, Kagnout, Loudia Diola, Elinkine, Santhiaba Ouolof.
