= MV Aline Sitoe Diatta =

Senegalese ferry

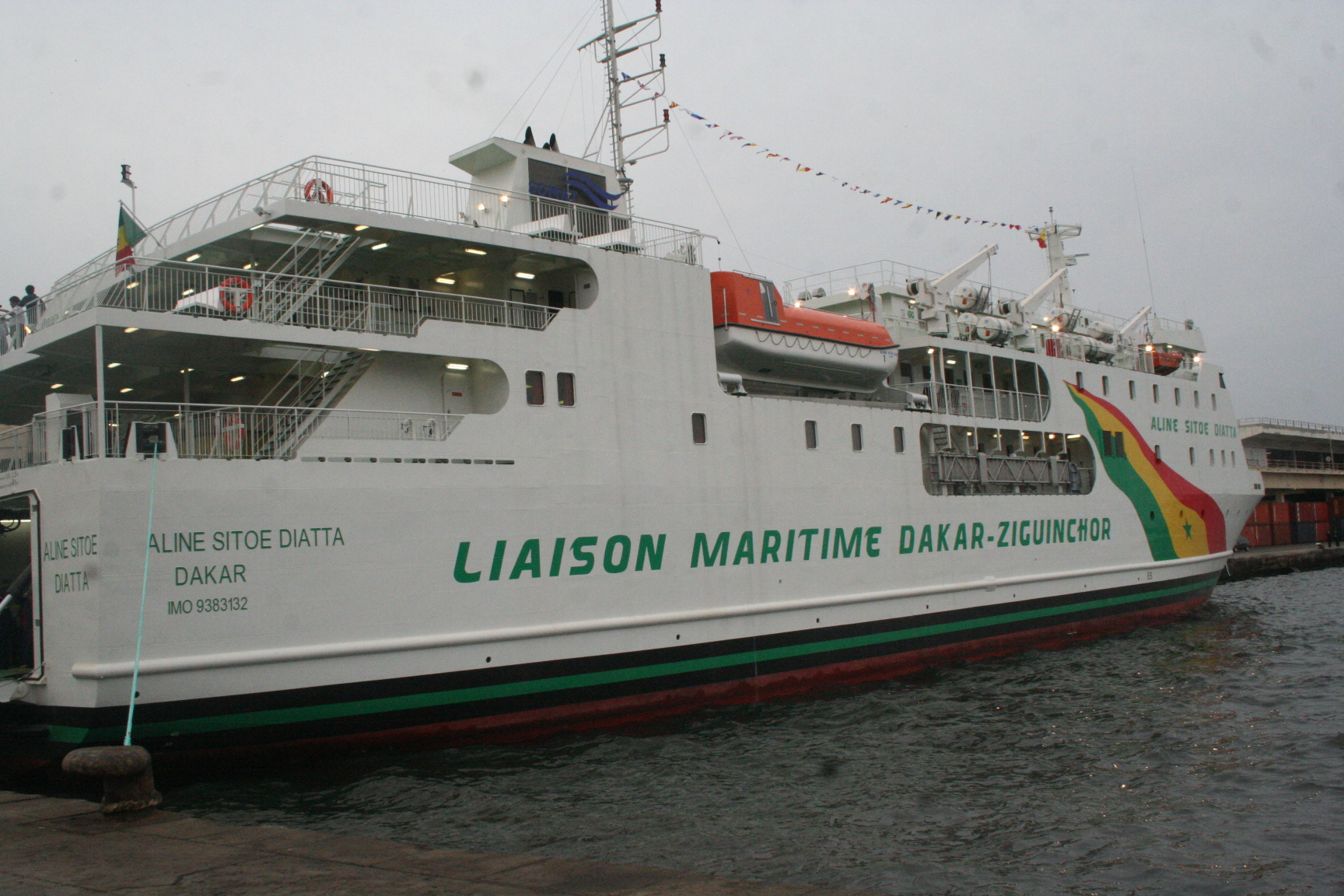
- Aline Sitoe Diatta at Dakar in 2008

History

Senegal
- Name: MV Aline Sitoe Diatta
- Namesake: Aline Sitoe Diatta
- Owner: Ministere de l'Economie Maritime et des Transports Maritimes Internationaux
- Operator: Consortium Senegalais d'Activites Maritimes (COSAMA SA)
- Port of registry: Dakar
- Route: Dakar—Ziguinchor
- Builder: Fr. Fassmer GmbH & Co. KG., Berne, Germany
- Yard number: 2060
- Laid down: 1 July 2006
- Launched: 25 October 2007
- Completed: 24 November 2007
- In service: March 2008
- Identification: IMO number: 9383132; Call sign: 6WIX
- Status: in active service, as of 2012

General characteristics
- Type: RoPax ferry
- Tonnage: 3,481 GT; 693 DWT; 1,045 NT
- Displacement: 2,349 t (2,312 long tons)
- Length: 76 m (249 ft 4 in) o/a
- Beam: 15.5 m (50 ft 10 in)
- Draught: 3.2 m (10 ft 6 in)
- Decks: 5
- Propulsion: 2 × 1,800 kW (2,414 hp) Wärtsilä 9L20 diesel engines; 1 × 500 kW (671 hp) bow thruster; 2 shafts
- Speed: 14.5 knots (26.9 km/h; 16.7 mph)
- Range: 1,750 nmi (3,240 km; 2,010 mi) at 12 kn (22 km/h; 14 mph)
- Capacity: 504 passengers; 28 vehicles
- Crew: 39

The MV Aline Sitoe Diatta (named after the Senegalese freedom fighter) is a ferry in active service since March 2008 between Ziguinchor and Dakar over the Atlantic Ocean. The ship passes the mouth of the Gambia river.

The vessel was built in 2006-07 by Fr. Fassmer Shipyards in Berne, Germany.

There are two voyages per week in each direction. The voyage takes about 15 hours, including boarding and debarking.

Since the capsizing and sinking of the MV Le Joola in September 2002, there has been much more attention paid to passenger safety.

== See also ==
- Transport in Senegal
- MV Le Joola (capsized in September 2002)
