= Musée Boribana =

Coordinates: 14°44′53″N 17°30′28″W

The Musée Boribana is a museum located in Senegal.

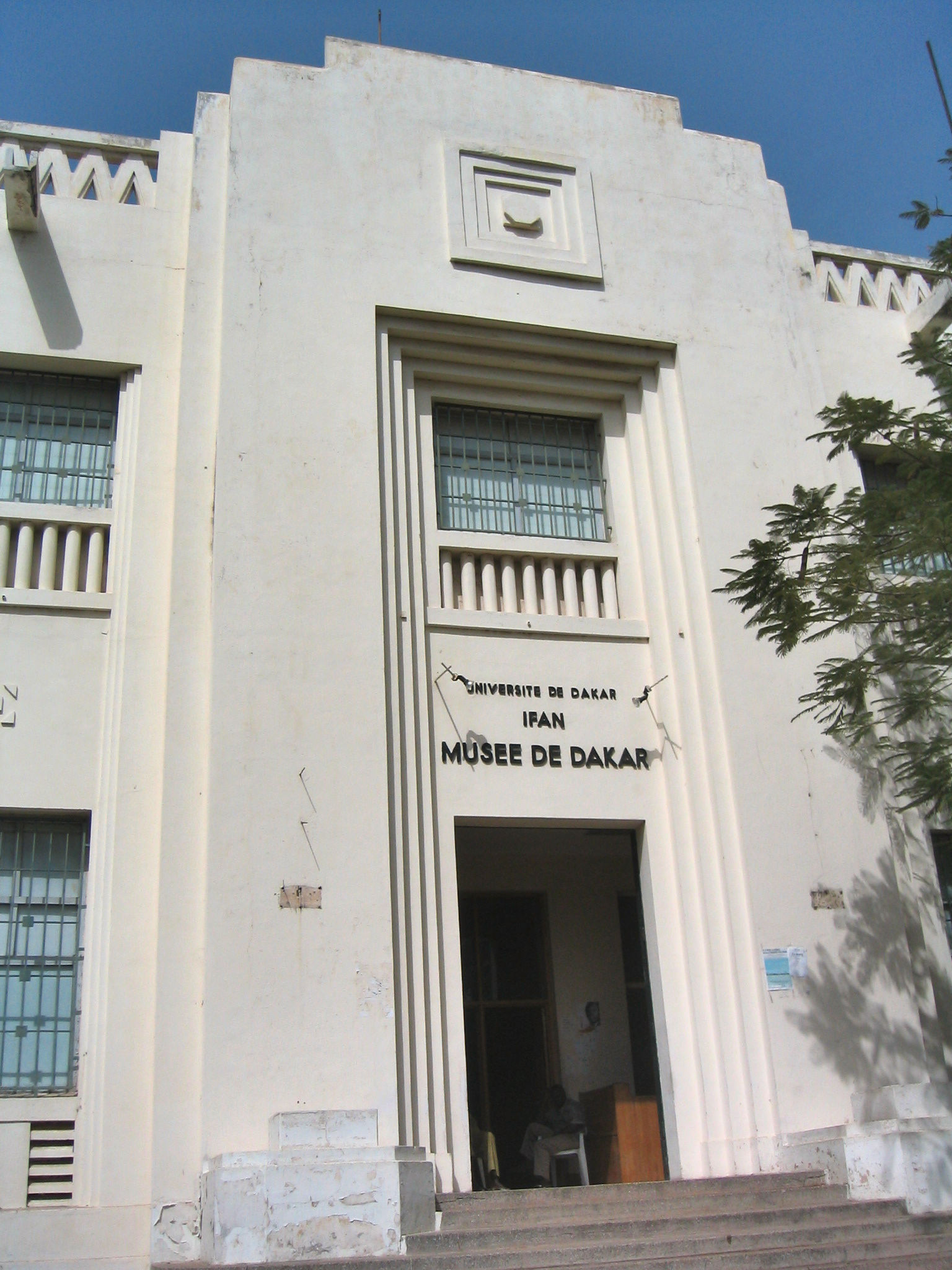
Musée Boribana

== See also ==
- List of museums in Senegal
