= Musée de la Mer =

Museum in Senegal

Coordinates: 14.6684°N 17.3998°W

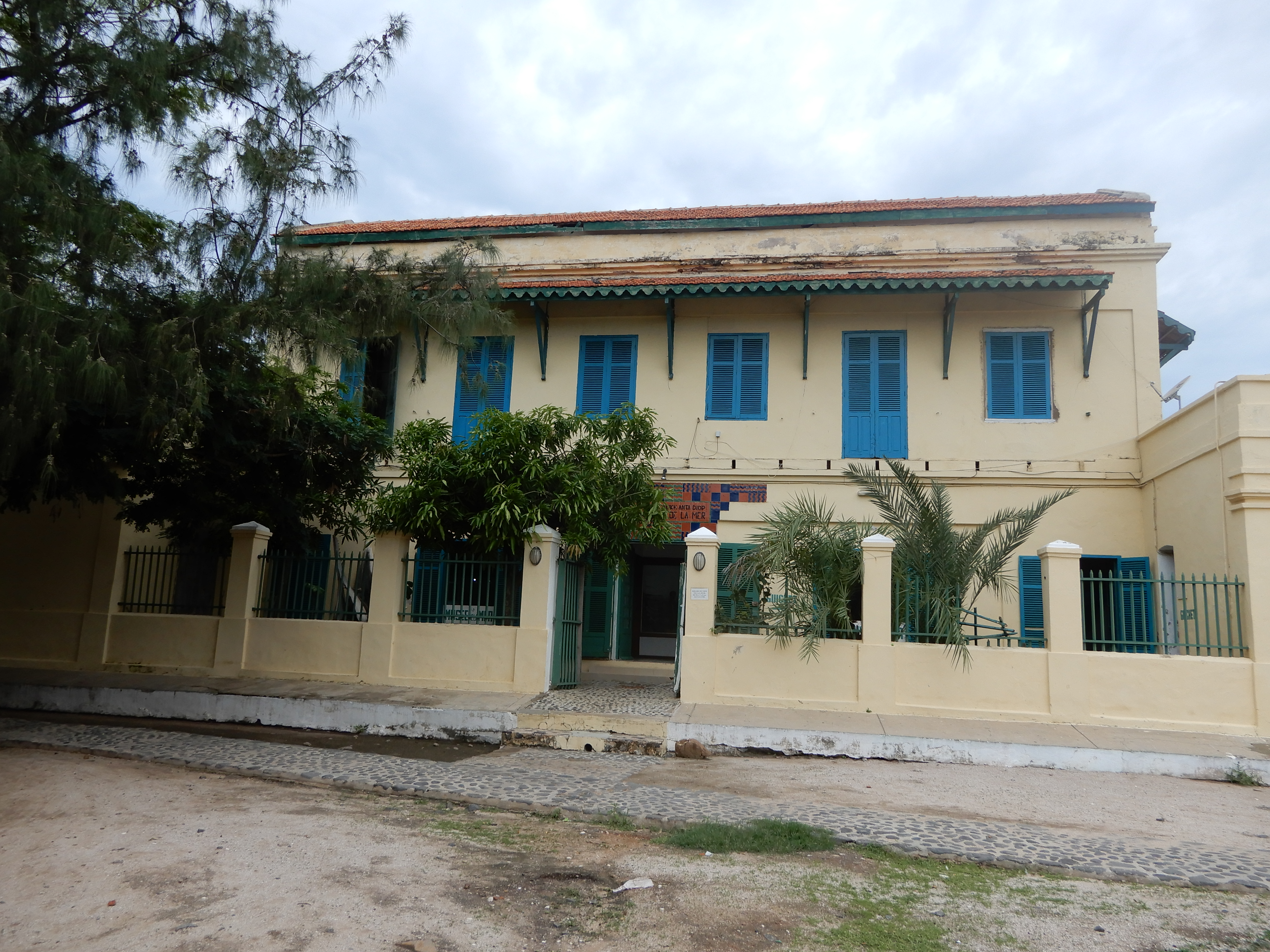
- Established: January 1960
- Location: Dakar (Senegal)

The Musée de la Mer is a museum located in Gorée, Senegal. The museum contains various documents and photos on marine animals in Senegal with a collection of 6,000 species.

== See also ==
- List of museums in Senegal
