= Musée Senghor Fondation =

Senegalese museum

The Musée Senghor Fondation is a museum located in Senegal.

== See also ==
- List of museums in Senegal
