= List of museums in Senegal =

This is a list of museums in Senegal.

== List ==
- Centre de Recherches et de Documentation du Sénégal (CRDS)
- IFAN Museum of African Arts
- Historical Museum of Senegal in Gorée
- Maison des Esclaves de Gorée
- Musée Boribana
- Musée d'Art Africain
- Musée de la Culture Diola
- Musée de la Femme Henriette Bathily
- Musée de la Mer
- Musée des Forces Armées Senegalaise
- Musée Géologique Africain
- Musée Régional de Tambacounda
- Musée Régional de Thiès
- Musée Senghor Fondation

== See also ==
- List of museums
