= Aline Sitoe Diatta =

Jola spiritual leader in Senegal (c. 1920–1944)

- Born: c. 1920; Kabrousse, Basse Casamance, French Senegal
- Died: 22 May 1944 (aged approx. 24); Timbuktu, French Sudan
- Occupations: Spiritual leader, rainmaker

Aline Sitoe Diatta (Note: Aline Sitoe's first name is sometimes rendered as Aline Sitoé, Alinesitoué, or Aliin Sitooye. Her surname is sometimes rendered as "Jaata".) (c. 1920 – 22 May 1944) was a Jola (Note: Sometimes rendered "Diola") spiritual leader and rainmaker who lived in French Senegal. Often compared to Joan of Arc, Aline Sitoe was born in Kabrousse, Basse Casamance, where she was orphaned. She moved to Dakar around 1935 to work as a domestic servant but returned to Kabrousse after receiving a vision, which she stated was from Emitai, the supreme being in Jola religious belief.

Upon her return to Kabrousse, Aline Sitoe gained renown as a spiritual leader. She acted in opposition to French colonial authorities, rejecting colonial cash crops, head taxes, and conscription. She also promoted cattle sacrifice, undermining French efforts to secure food for urban centers in northern Senegal. The many pilgrims who traveled from nearby villages to visit her alarmed French colonial authorities, and in 1943, after violent clashes in villages throughout the Basse Casamance region, French forces arrested her. Her role in these clashes is debated, with scholars such as Wilmetta J. Toliver-Diallo and Meghan O'Donoghue arguing that French authorities used her as a scapegoat for the unrest in the region. After her arrest, Aline Sitoe was convicted of inciting a rebellion and died in a concentration camp in Timbuktu, then part of French Sudan. Her death was not made public until 1983.

In Senegal, Aline Sitoe is often celebrated as a heroine who resisted colonial rule. After Senegal gained its independence, her legacy grew in prominence through the proliferation of cultural and scholarly works. Some scholars, such as Toliver-Diallo and Robert M. Baum, argue that nationalist narratives have co-opted and simplified Aline Sitoe Diatta's legacy, downplaying her role as a religious figure and prophet. Baum credits Aline Sitoe with transforming Jola religious traditions by emphasizing a direct connection to Emitai and challenging traditional Jola religious hierarchies.

== Early life ==
Aline Sitoe Diatta was born in Kabrousse, Basse Casamance, then part of French Senegal, c. 1920. After being orphaned, Aline Sitoe was adopted by her uncle, Elubaliin. Suffering from a form of paralysis that left her with a limp, (Note: Toliver-Diallo and Rolis both claim that Aline Sitoe's paralysis affected her at a young age, while O'Donoghue claims that she contracted polio after moving to Dakar, which is what caused her limp.) Aline Sitoe's ability to contribute to the agricultural activities of the town was limited. According to writer Aline Rolis, Aline Sitoe left Kabrousse to move to Ziguinchor, where she may have worked as a dockworker. However, according to researcher Wilmetta J. Toliver-Diallo, she remained in Kabrousse until roughly 1935, when she moved to Dakar to work as a domestic servant. She settled in the Médina neighborhood, where she lived with her partner, a dockworker named Thomas Diatta. (Note: According to Toliver-Diallo, the two were married. According to Rolis, they cohabited together but were not married, which would have been unusual at the time.) The couple had one daughter, Seynabou.

== Spiritual leadership ==
In 1941 or 1942, (Note: 1941 according to Baum in 2009 and 1942 according Toliver-Diallo and Baum in 2016) while working as a domestic servant in Dakar, Aline Sitoe began having visions. These visions, which Aline Sitoe claimed were sent by Emitai, the supreme being in Jola religious belief, ordered her to return to Kabrousse and establish a spirit shrine. She left Dakar without her partner—who was hospitalized there and died soon after she left—but with her daughter. When she returned to Kabrousse, she did not initially tell anyone about her visions. However, in May 1942, she summoned the town elders and performed the Kasila ritual, (Note: According to Baum, the name Kasila may refer to both a spirit and a spirit shrine established by a prophet named Baliba, described by Portuguese administrators in 1890) during which she instructed the elders to sacrifice a black bull. After this, it began to rain. This was followed by a six-week period of communal feasts and singing, with Aline Sitoe performing rituals at her personal spirit shrine, Houssahara. (Note: Sometimes rendered "Oussahara".) Many pilgrims from throughout the region traveled to Kabrousse to learn the Kasila ritual. Aline Sitoe also married Alou Gaye Diatta, a local religious leader, during this period—becoming his second wife in a polygamous union and sealing a contract between them. The region saw record rainfalls, ending several years of severe drought, and the subsequent harvest was plentiful.

As her influence grew, Aline Sitoe's teachings increasingly conflicted with Vichy France's agricultural policy. While French administrators had previously relied on imports from French Indochina to satisfy demand for rice in the Dakar region, they were unable to do so after the Japanese invasion. As a result, they began a compulsory rice-purchasing campaign in Casamance. Amidst this campaign, Aline Sitoe advocated for the cultivation of local rice over high-yield strains and rejected the cultivation of cash crops such as peanuts and groundnuts. Linking regional droughts to French colonial labor and tax policies, she prophesied the collapse of conscription, the French use of head taxes, and French rule in general. Her promotion of cattle sacrifice further undermined French efforts to requisition Casamance's cattle reserves to feed urban centers in northern Senegal, and the surge of pilgrims visiting her prompted alarm on the part of French authorities. Local leaders who had benefited from colonial rule were also alarmed by her growing influence. In June 1942, Georges Rey, the colonial governor of Senegal, ordered the region's cercle commander to monitor her activities, authorizing her arrest and expulsion from the region if necessary.

== Capture, exile, and death ==
In January 1943, French authorities sent military detachments into Casamance to execute their rice-purchasing scheme. Residents of several villages in the Oussouye region refused to relinquish their rice. In the village of Ayoune, a group of hundreds of armed Jola from the nearby villages of Efok and Youtou fired shots at one of the detachments. That same day, a group of men from Efok attacked a French medical unit, convinced that they were covertly gathering information for colonial tax enforcement. Soon after these incidents, a detachment set out to arrest Aline Sitoe. After reaching the area at night, one of their guides thought they saw Aline Sitoe attempting to escape, leading them to shoot and kill a woman who turned out to be her co-wife. To prevent further violence, Aline Sitoe, who had been in seclusion while menstruating, appeared the next morning. She was struck to the ground, then arrested alongside seventeen others, including Alou Gaye. Kabrousse was forced to relinquish all of its rice reserves, which were likely sent to Dakar.

Aline Sitoe was taken to Ziguinchor and placed in solitary confinement. Several of the other arrestees were taken to the village of Oussouye, where they were questioned about Aline Sitoe's activities. One arrestee claimed that Aline Sitoe had told him to not relinquish his rice, to not allow his children to be conscripted, and to not pay taxes. Alou Gaye claimed that he had been forced to marry Aline Sitoe due to her stature as a religious leader and her spirit shrine. This account was contradicted by people in Kabrousse, who stated that Alou Gaye had married Aline Sitoe willingly. During Aline Sitoe's interrogation, she stated that she was "sent by God who appeared to me several times", and that she "only transmitted the directives that he dictated to me". She promised that, if freed, she would "no longer say one word against the whites". Meanwhile, French administrators traveled throughout Basse Casamance seeking evidence that Aline Sitoe was responsible for inciting the rebellions in Ayoune and Efok.

Aline Sitoe was tried under the French Native code. She was accused of leading a campaign to make the people of the Oussouye region disobey colonial authorities, in the process destabilizing the colony and inciting a rebellion against the colonial government. In her defense, she stated that she was a divine messenger transmitting directives from God, denying any role in instigating the revolt. She further stated that her mission was apolitical and not aimed at fomenting resistance—a claim that was corroborated by Catholic missionaries in Ziguinchor. Despite this, she was sentenced to exile and imprisonment in the city of Kayes, then part of French Sudan. Many of her associates received lesser sentences after claiming that they were only following the teachings of Aline Sitoe, whom they considered a divine messenger. After being sent to Kayes, Aline Sitoe was transferred to a concentration camp in Timbuktu (present day Mali), where, as a result of the lack of fruit or vegetables provided to prisoners, she died of scurvy on 22 May 1944. Her death was not reported by French authorities. (Note: Her death was not made public until 1983. See § Postmortem developments for details.)

=== Postmortem developments ===
Casamancais priest Augustin Diamacoune Senghor began calling for an inquiry into Aline Sitoe's death in 1980. In 1983, soon after the beginning of the Casamance conflict, Abdou Diouf, who was campaigning to become president of Senegal, began speaking publicly about Aline Sitoe's legacy, hoping to deepen the connection between Casamance and northern Senegal. That year, he sent an official delegation to Mali in collaboration with the National Archives of Senegal, including Jola researcher Fulgence Sagna. The team traveled to Timbuktu, where they found Aline Sitoe's unmarked grave and her birth certificate. After her death was made public, Diouf declared her a "heroine of Senegal". Residents of Kabrousse stated that none of Aline Sitoe's family members were consulted about the trip or asked to participate.

== Legacy ==
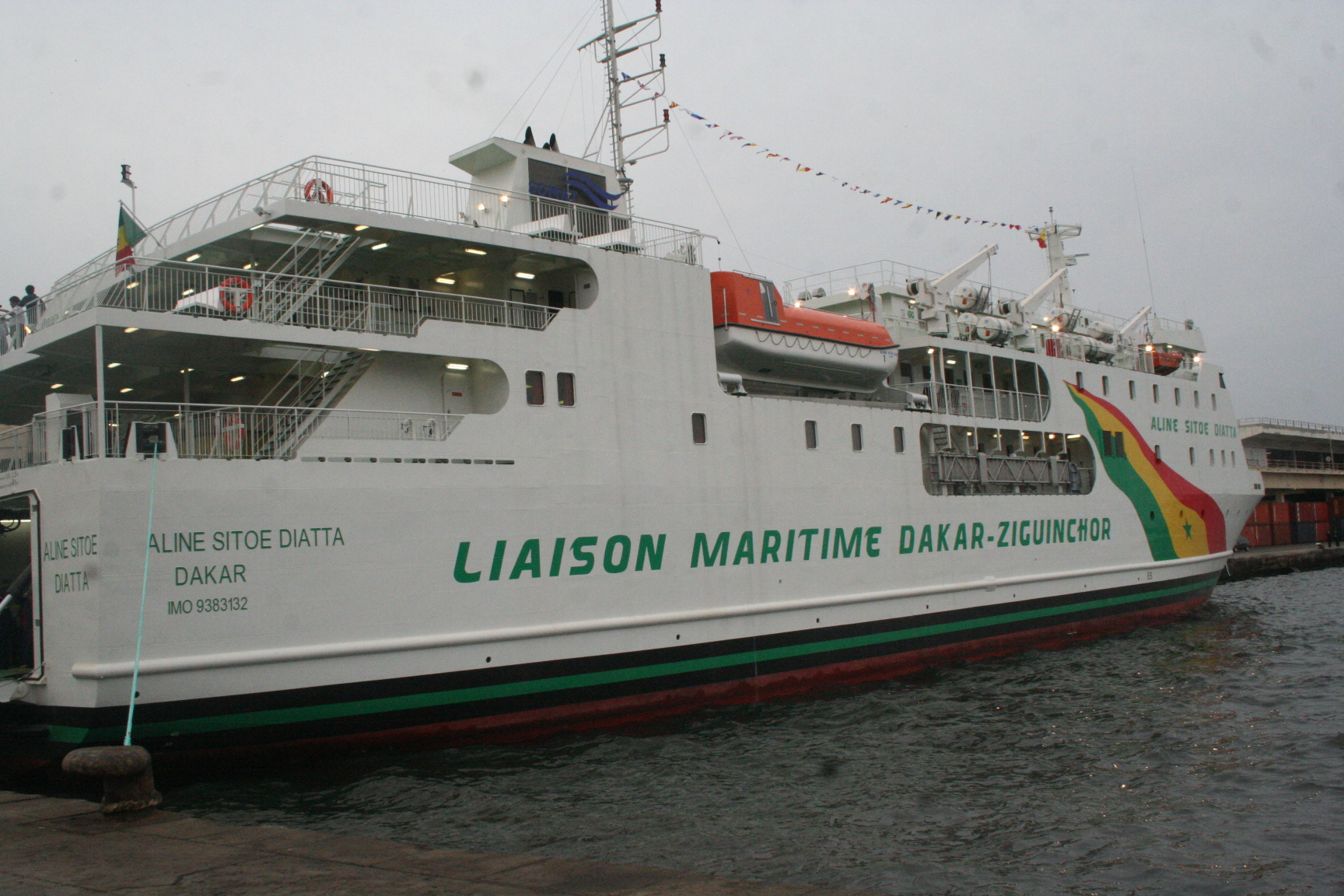
The MV Aline Sitoe Diatta, which connects Dakar and Ziguinchor

Aline Sitoe is a well-known historical, religious, and political figure in Senegal, where she is often considered a heroic figure who resisted French colonial rule. She is frequently compared to French folk heroine Joan of Arc. In Dakar, she is often called "the woman who was more than a man". Interest in Aline Sitoe expanded beyond the Basse Casamance region in the late 1960s, corresponding with the cultural revival that took place in Senegal post-independence. This interest intensified during the 1970s, with Augustin Diamacoune Senghor calling Aline Sitoe the "Diola Joan of Arc" on state radio, discussing her opposition to French agricultural policies, and linking her to the 1943 rebellions. The 1971 film Emitaï, directed by Ousmane Sembène, prominently features Aline Sitoe, portraying her as the rebellions' instigator.

In 1980, Senghor organized a conference in Dakar to discuss Aline Sitoe's life and work and published a pamphlet titled "Aliin Sitooye Jaata: Vie et Oeuvre" (transl. 'Aliin Sitooye Jaata: Life and Work'), in which he portrays Aline Sitoe as an anti-colonial hero struggling for the independence of Casamance from Senegal. The pamphlet was widely distributed in Jola communities. The Stade Aline Sitoe Diatta, a stadium in Ziguinchor, was named after her in 1986. The passenger ferry MV Aline Sitoe Diatta, which connects Dakar to Ziguinchor, is also named for her, as is a dormitory building at Cheikh Anta Diop University in Dakar. A documentary about her life was aired on Senegalese television in 1988.

The character Johanna Simetho of Wissombo from the 1990 historical novel Les Tambours de la Mémoire (transl. 'The Drums of Memory'), written by Senegalese novelist Boubacar Boris Diop, is loosely based on Aline Sitoe. A song dedicated to her, titled "Aline Sitoé Diatta", was released in 1992 by musician Alioune Kassé. Senegalese writer Marouba Fall staged Aliin Sitooye Jatta or The Lady of Kabrus at the Daniel Sorano National Theater in 1993. In 2008, a coin was minted in Senegal featuring Aline Sitoe's face and the inscription "The woman who was more than a man".

=== Historigraphy ===
In 1969, Jean Girard published Genèse du pouvoir charismatique en Basse Casamance (transl. 'Genesis of charismatic power in Bass Casamance'), an anthropological study that discusses Aline Sitoe's activities, particularly her claims that she received revelations from Emitai. He argues that Aline Sitoe helped transform the religious activity in the Jola region from a primarily fetishist framework to a more theistic one. Robert M. Baum also discusses the ways that Aline Sitoe transformed Jola religious traditions. He argues that she emphasized direct connection to Emitai, challenging traditional hierarchies of age, gender, and wealth associated with Jola religious practice and promoting communal solidarity. He also argues that she inspired a lineage of Jola prophets who continue to assert their connections with Emitai, among them Alandisso Bassène and Sibeth Diedhiou.

Some scholars argue that Aline Sitoe was not strongly linked to the 1943 rebellions in Basse Casamance. Toliver-Diallo contends that Aline Sitoe was a scapegoat for French colonial authorities and local leaders, who were frightened of her growing influence, supplying information to the colonial authorities leading to her arrest. Analyzing French colonial archives, researcher Meghan O'Donoghue argues that French colonial administrators fabricated an official narrative that exaggerated Aline Sitoe's individual role in the 1943 rebellions to justify her punishment and obscure the collective nature of resistance against French rule.

Toliver-Diallo argues that artists from outside Casamance, such as Kassé and Fall, have manipulated public memory by imposing nationalist intentions on Aline Sitoe, simplifying Jola beliefs, reinforcing government-approved nationalist narratives, and downplaying her religious significance to the people of Kabrousse. Baum similarly argues that both Senegalese nationalist and Casamance separatist narratives surrounding Aline Sitoe downplay her religious significance and that she is best understood as a prophet who opposed "early forms of the Green Revolution".

== Sources ==
- "Aline Sitoé Diatta: The Story Of Casamance's Young Heroine Queen". The Standard. 8 June 2018.
- Baum, Robert M. (2009). "Prophetess: Aline Sitoé Diatta as a Contested Icon in Contemporary Senegal". In Falola, Toyin; Ngom, Fallou (eds.). Facts, Fiction, and African Creative Imaginations. New York: Routledge. pp. 64–75. doi:10.4324/9780203872659-9. ISBN 978-0-203-87265-9.
- Baum, Robert M. (2016). West Africa's Women of God: Alinesitoué and the Diola Prophetic Tradition. Indiana University Press. ISBN 978-0-253-01767-3. JSTOR j.ctt17t7571.10.
- Konte, Fatou Bintou (2006). "Cité Aline Sitoé Diatta, ex-Claudel: Le défi de la cohabitation". Seneweb.com. Archived from the original on 16 November 2016.
- O'Donoghue, Meghan (2024). "Alinesitoué Diatta: Rebel Leader or Colonial Scapegoat?". French Historical Studies. 47 (3): 481–516. doi:10.1215/00161071-11156288. ISSN 0016-1071.
- Petty, Sheila (2011). "Postcolonial transformations: From Emitaï (Sembène 1971) to Moolaadé (Sembène 2004)". International Journal of Francophone Studies. 14 (3): 323–338. doi:10.1386/ijfs.14.3.323_1. ISSN 1368-2679.
- Rolis, Aline (2017). "Aline Sitoé Diatta". Alternatives Non-Violentes (in French). 185 (4). CAIRN: 34. doi:10.3917/anv.185.0034. ISSN 0223-5498.
- Schwarz-Bart, Simone (2001). In Praise of Black Women: Heroines of the Slavery Era. Madison: University of Wisconsin Press. ISBN 0-299-17250-3.
- Stewart, John (1989). African States and Rulers. Jefferson; London: McFarland. ISBN 0-89950-390-X.
- Toliver, Wilmetta Jesvalynn (1999). Aline Sitoe Diatta: Addressing Historical Silences Through Senegalese Culture (Doctoral thesis). Stanford: Stanford University. ProQuest 304555067.
- Toliver-Diallo, Wilmetta J. (2005). "'The Woman Who Was More Than a Man': Making Aline Sitoe Diatta into a National Heroine in Senegal". Canadian Journal of African Studies / Revue Canadienne des Études Africaines. 39 (2). Taylor & Francis: 340–362. doi:10.1080/00083968.2005.10751320. ISSN 0008-3968.
