= Musée Régional de Thiès =

Museum in Senegal

Coordinates: 14°47′45.8″N 16°55′59.2″W

The Musée Régional de Thiès is a museum located in Senegal.

== See also ==
- List of museums in Senegal
