= Musée des Forces Armées Senegalaise =

Museum in Senegal

The Musée des Forces Armées Senegalaise is a museum located in Senegal.

== See also ==
- List of museums in Senegal
