= Cité Aline Sitoe Diatta =

Neighborhood in west central Dakar, Senegal

Cité Aline Sitoe Diatta is a neighborhood in west central Dakar, Senegal.

== Overview ==
Formerly known as Cité Claudel, after independence the area was named after Aline Sitoe Diatta, an anti-colonial leader from Casamance. Although the name has changed, many still refer to the area as Claudel or Fann. Cité Aline Sitoe Diatta is the home of Cheikh Anta Diop University, and consequently hosts a large, vibrant (and often crowded) student community. Just west of the prosperous Medina neighborhood and bordered by the ocean Corniche road and Point Fann, in the early 20th century, the area was military drill ground, called the "Champ de Fann", which later became a sports ground. Administratively, it is part of Dakar Plateau, the city center. As it lies at the conjunction of the university area and the government and business center of the nation, it is often the scene of student protests.
