= Programme d'eau potable et d'assainissement du Millénaire =

Senegalese water agency

Agency overview
- Jurisdiction: Senegal
- Headquarters: Route des Pères Maristes Hann Cité Fort B, Villa N° 36 BP 47316 Dakar; 14.728419°N 17.438776°W
- Minister responsible: Serigne Mbaye Thiam, Minister of Water and Sanitation

Programme d'eau potable et d'assainissement du Millénaire (PEPAM, English: The Millennium Drinking Water and Sanitation Program) is an agency that works on drinking water and sanitation access in Senegal. The minister who runs it is the Minister of Water and Sanitation who is currently Serigne Mbaye Thiam.

The agency functions in two different capacities. The first of which is providing statistics to the government related to drinking water access and sanitation access. The other function is making drinking water and sanitation access more available to areas of Senegal where it is not currently provided.

In 2015, the agency aligned itself with the United Nations Sustainable Development Goals (SDG), with a focus on goal number 6. Goal 6 of the SDGs is to "Ensure access to water and sanitation for all", with specific targets set by 2030. These include "universal and equitable access to safe and affordable drinking water for all" and "achieve access to adequate and equitable sanitation".
