= Elinkine =

Elinkine Elinlin, Elinkinde
- Town
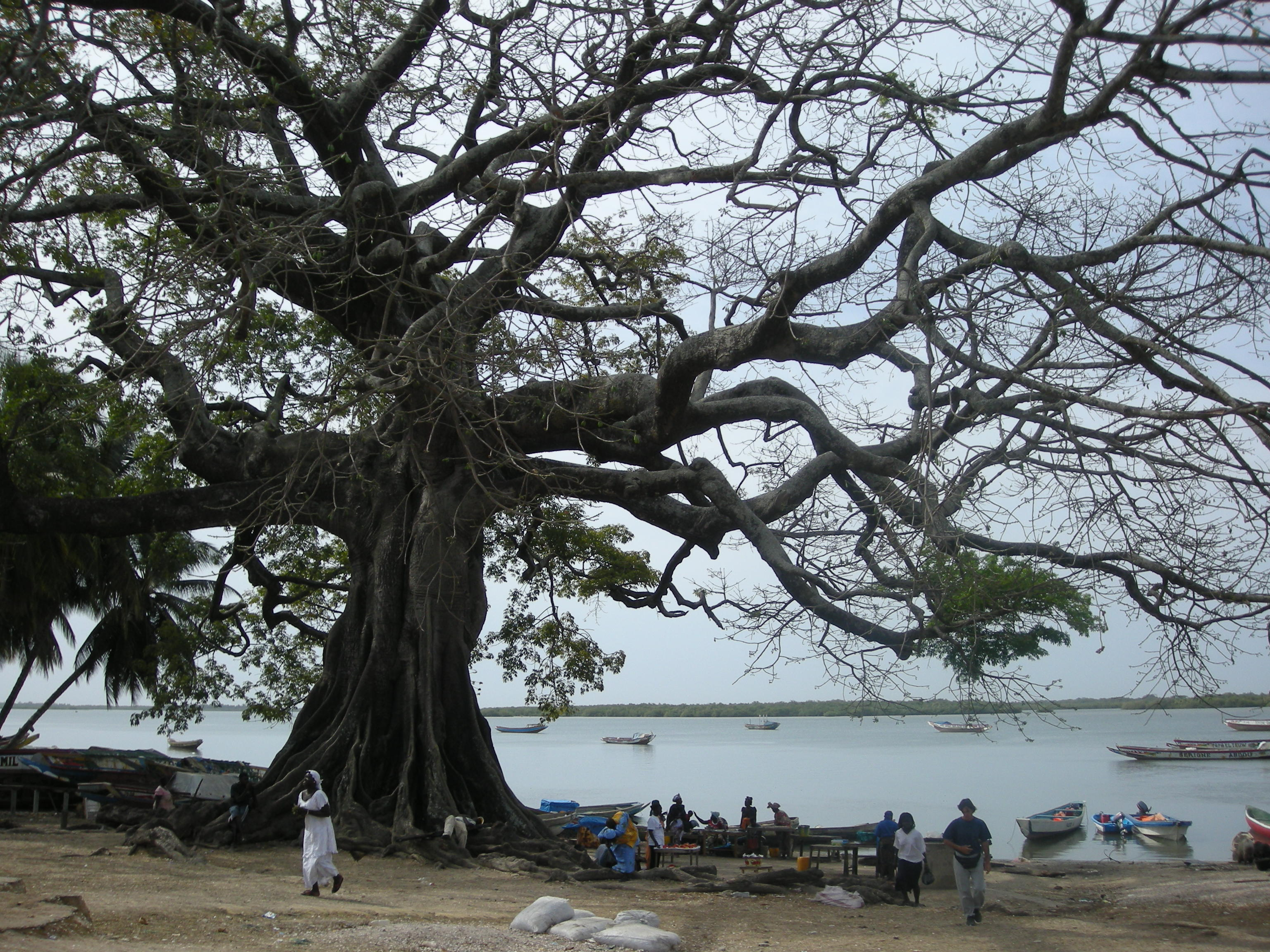
- Near the pier, a large Bombax tree (or other local Malvaceae species —all known as 'kapok')

- Location within Senegal
- Coordinates: 12°30′21″N 16°39′58″W
- Country: Senegal
- Region: Ziguinchor
- Department: Oussouye

Population
  - Total: 339

Elinkine (also called Elinlin or Elinkinde) is a town in Casamance, Senegal, located at the mouth of the Casamance River, 35 kilometres (22 mi) from Oussouye.

== History ==
A treaty between France and the leaders of Kagnout took place in Elinkine on March 25, 1851, resulting in the cession of the island of Carabane to France.

The well of Umar Tall was classified as a historic monument in 2003.

== Administration ==
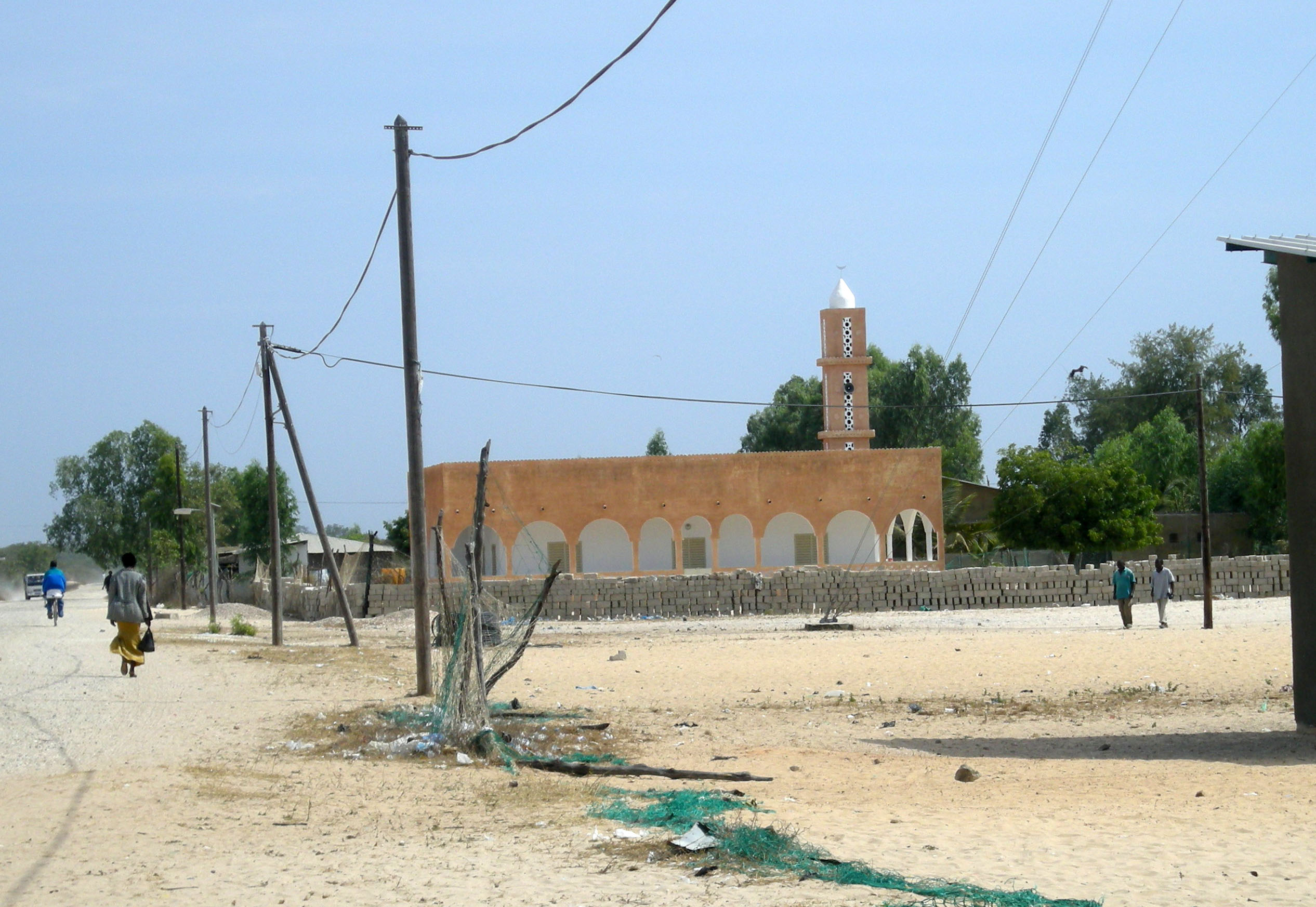
Mosque

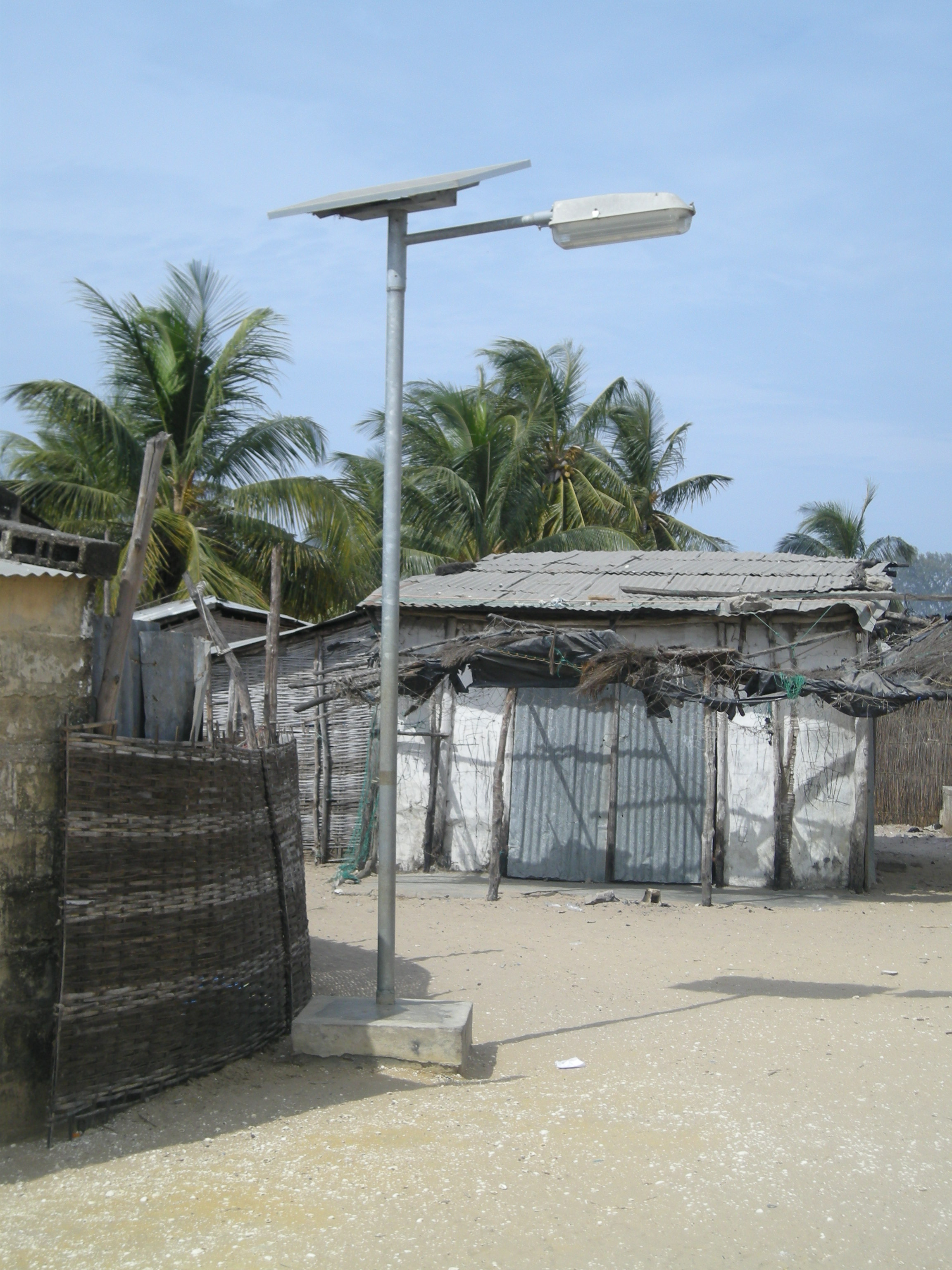
Solar lighting

The village is part of the rural community of Mlomp, Loudia Ouoloff, Oussouye, Ziguinchor.

== Geography ==
The nearest towns are Efrane Elinkine, Sifoka, Carabane, Samatit, Santiaba Ouolof, and Tamani.

=== Population ===
According to PEPAM (Water and Sanitation Program for the Millennium), there are 339 people and 47 households in Elinkine.

=== Economy ===
This small fishing port is a popular tourist location. This is partially because of its beach, but also because it is the embarkation point for the island of Carabane.

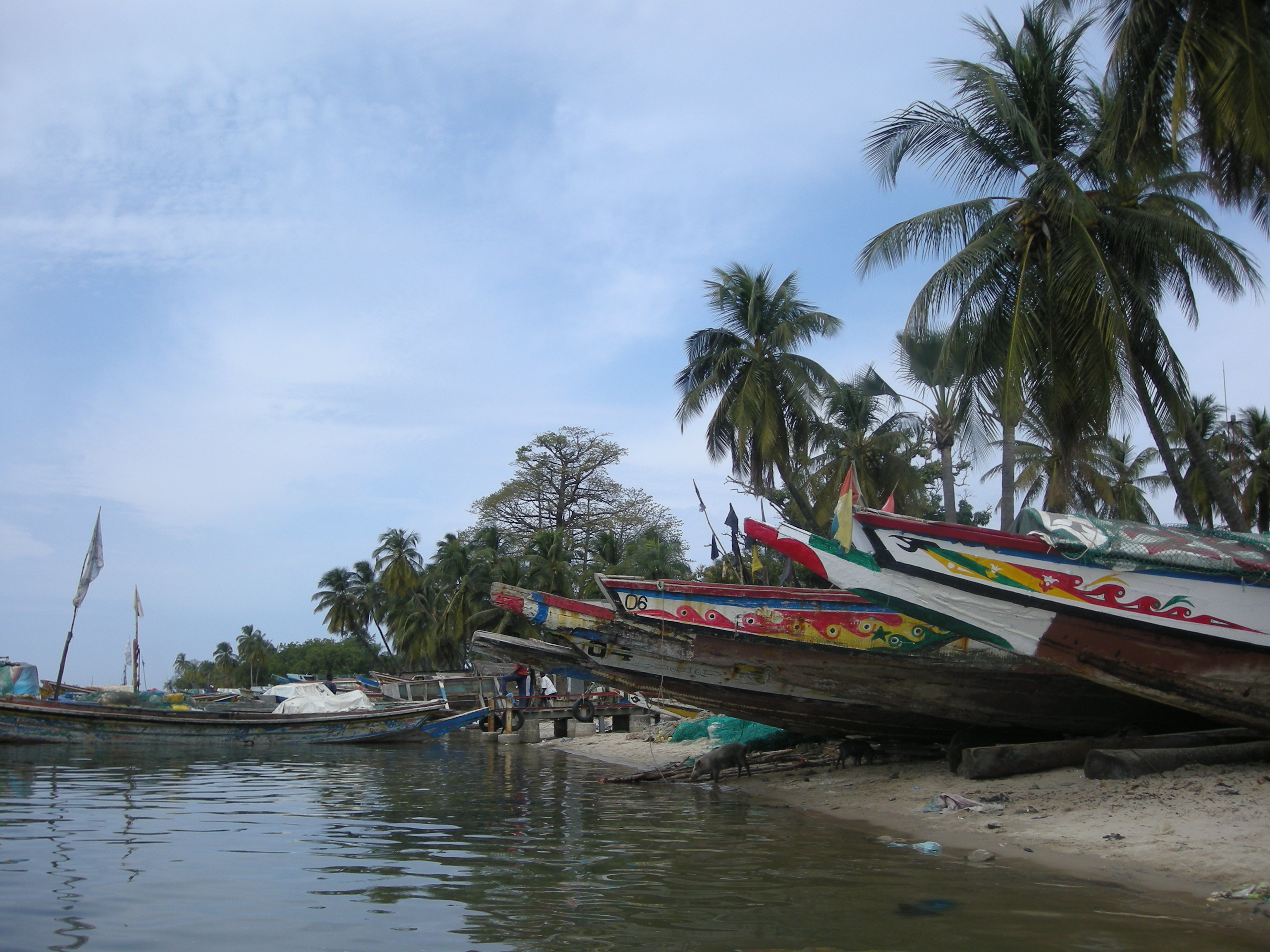
A fishing village

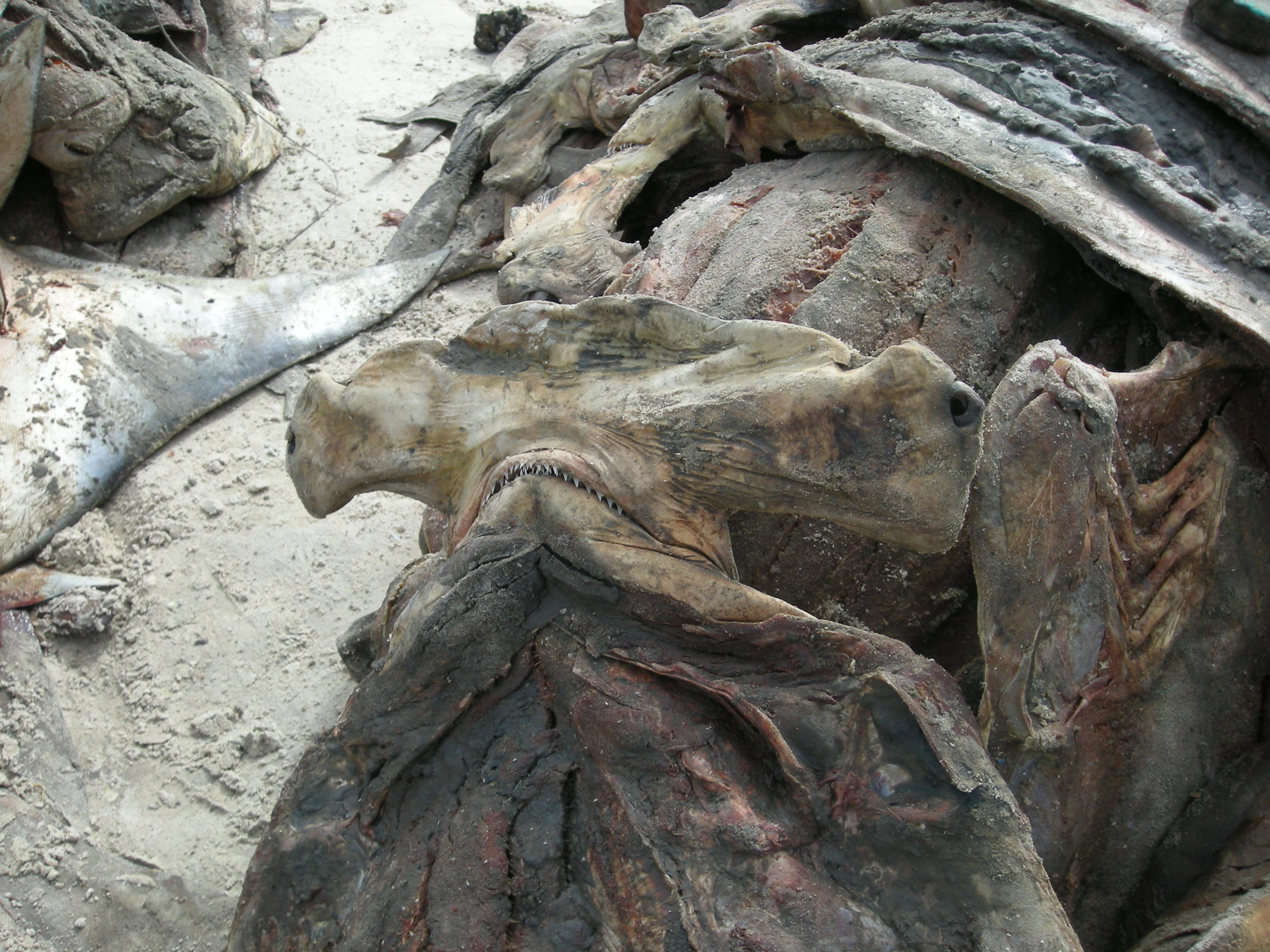
A scalloped hammerhead drying at the port

== Bibliography ==
- Muriel Scibilia (2003). La Casamance ouvre ses cases. Tourisme au Sénégal (in French). L’Harmattan. p. 174. ISBN 2-85802-676-9.
