= Emile Diatta =

Senegalese politician

Emfue Diatta is a Senegalese politician, and member of the Pan-African Parliament.
