= Nikine =

- Village
- Location within Senegal
- Coordinates: 12°32′3″N 16°45′15″W
- Country: Senegal
- Region: Ziguinchor
- Department: Oussouye

Nikine is a village in Kabrousse, Diembéring, Oussouye, Ziguinchor, Casamance, Senegal; most residents are from the Fula people and the population is in decline.
