= Niomoune =

- Village
- Location within Senegal
- Coordinates: 12°38′22″N 16°39′24″W
- Country: Senegal
- Region: Ziguinchor
- Department: Bignona
- Arrondissement: Kataba

Population (2002)
  - Total: 1,663

Niomoune is a village and rural community in Kataba Arrondissement, Bignona Department, Ziguinchor Region, Casamance, Senegal.

In the 2002 census the village had 1,663 inhabitants in 231 households.
