= Kabrousse =

Kabrousse Cabrousse
- Town
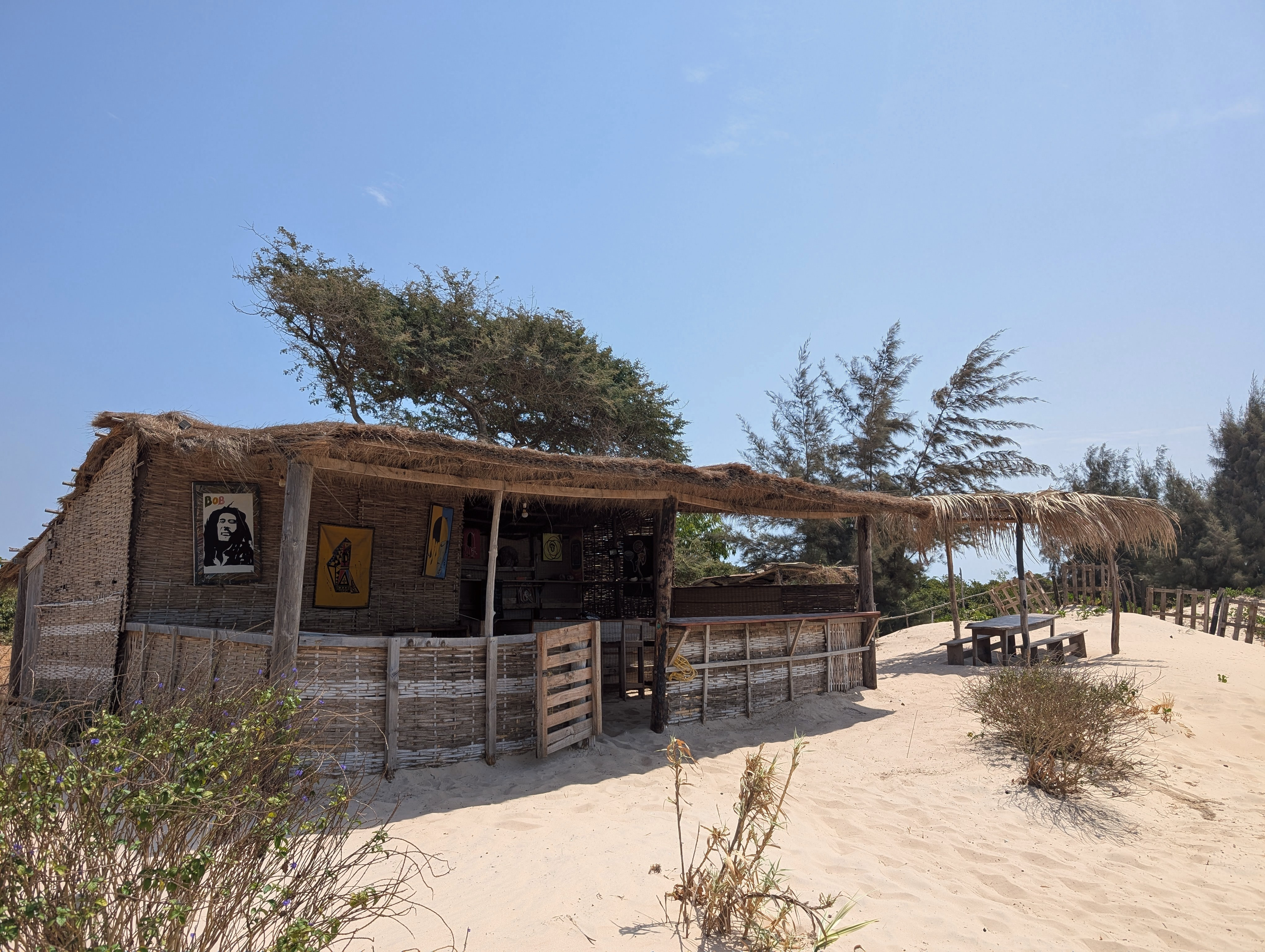
- Restaurant in Kabrousse

- Location within Senegal
- Coordinates: 12°21′20″N 16°43′14″W
- Country: Senegal
- Region: Ziguinchor
- Department: Oussouye
- Elevation: 13 m (43 ft)

Population
  - Total: 1,352

Kabrousse (also spelled Cabrousse) is a village in the rural community of Diembéring, Oussouye, Ziguinchor, Casamance, Senegal. It is a coastal village located a few kilometers south of Cap Skirring. In a straight line, it is the closest place in Africa to South America (2,841 km from Touros, Rio Grande do Norte in northeastern Brazil). About 2 km southeast of Kabrousse is the international border with Guinea-Bissau.

== Notable inhabitants ==
Aline Sitoe Diatta, the leader of a resistance movement against French West Africa, was born in Nialou in 1920.

== Gallery ==
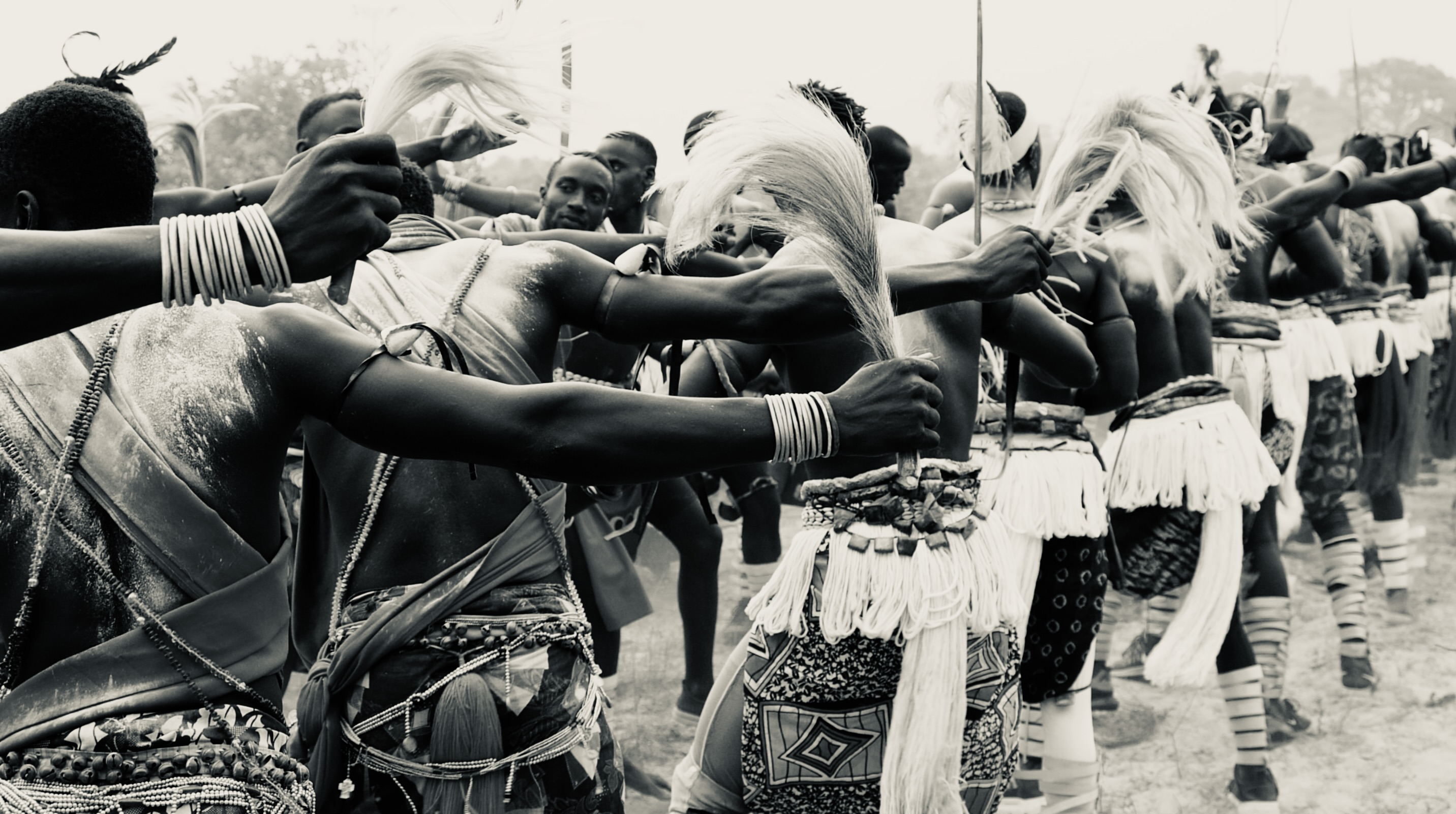
Traditional wrestling in Kabrousse

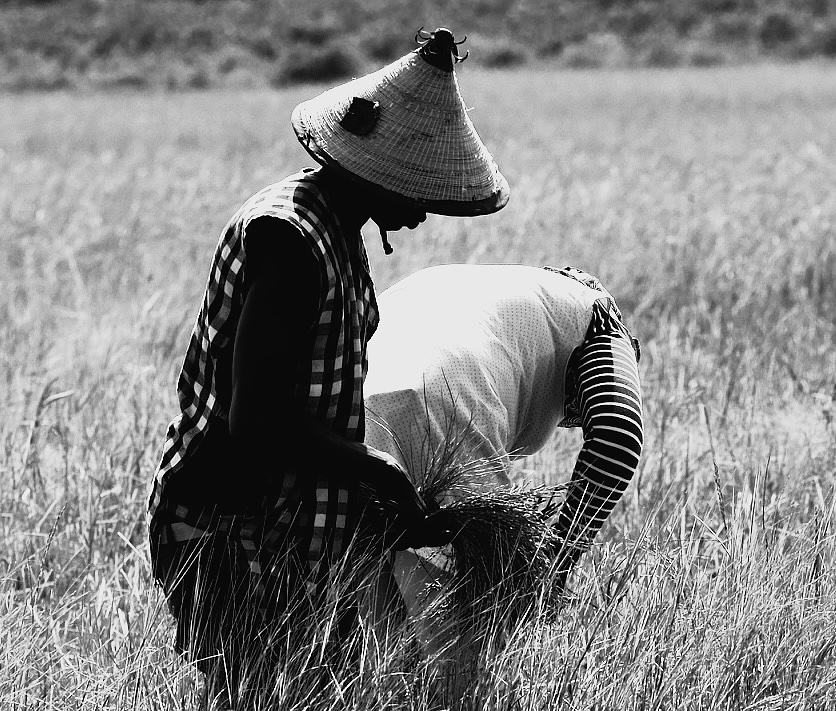
Rice farmers

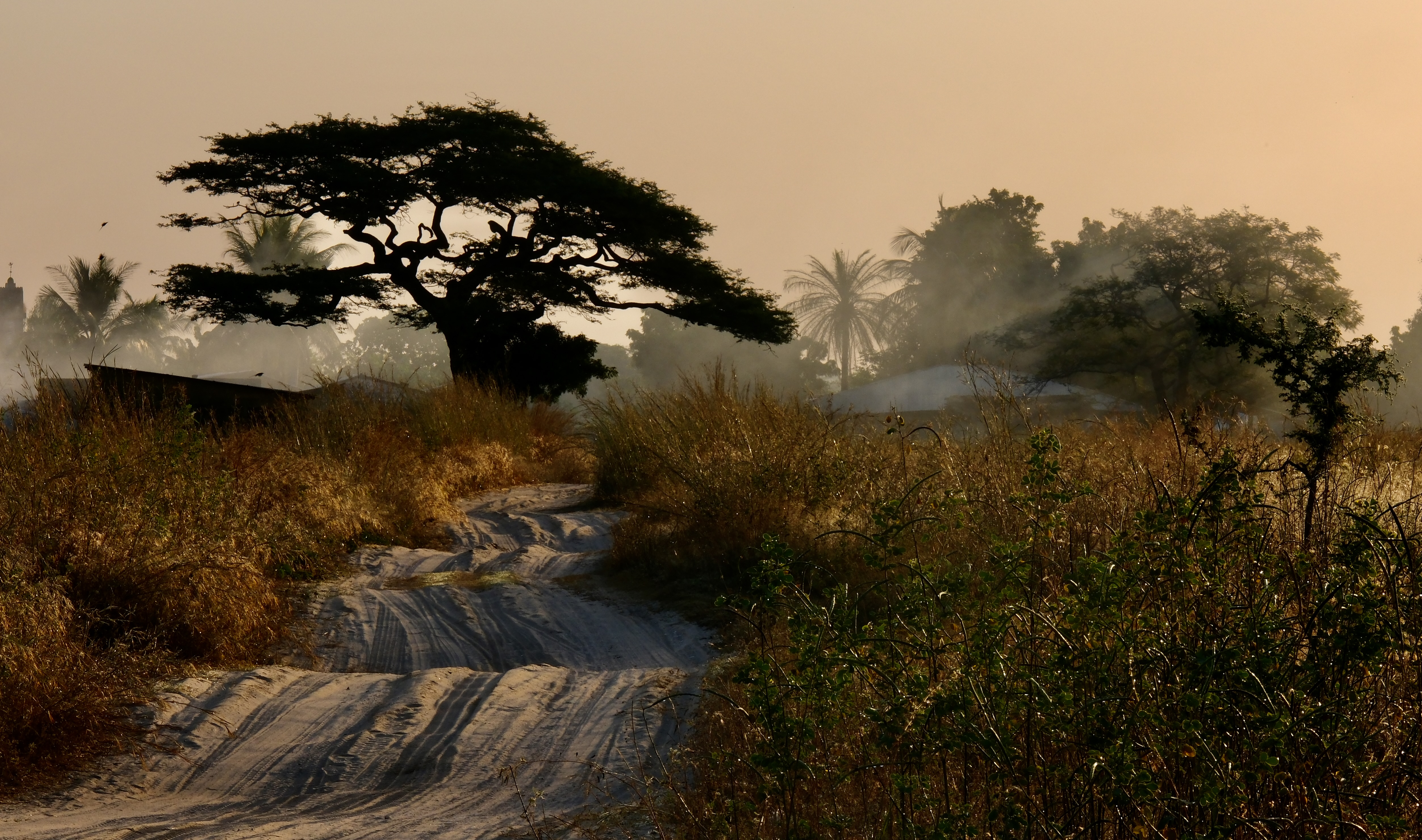
View of the scenery

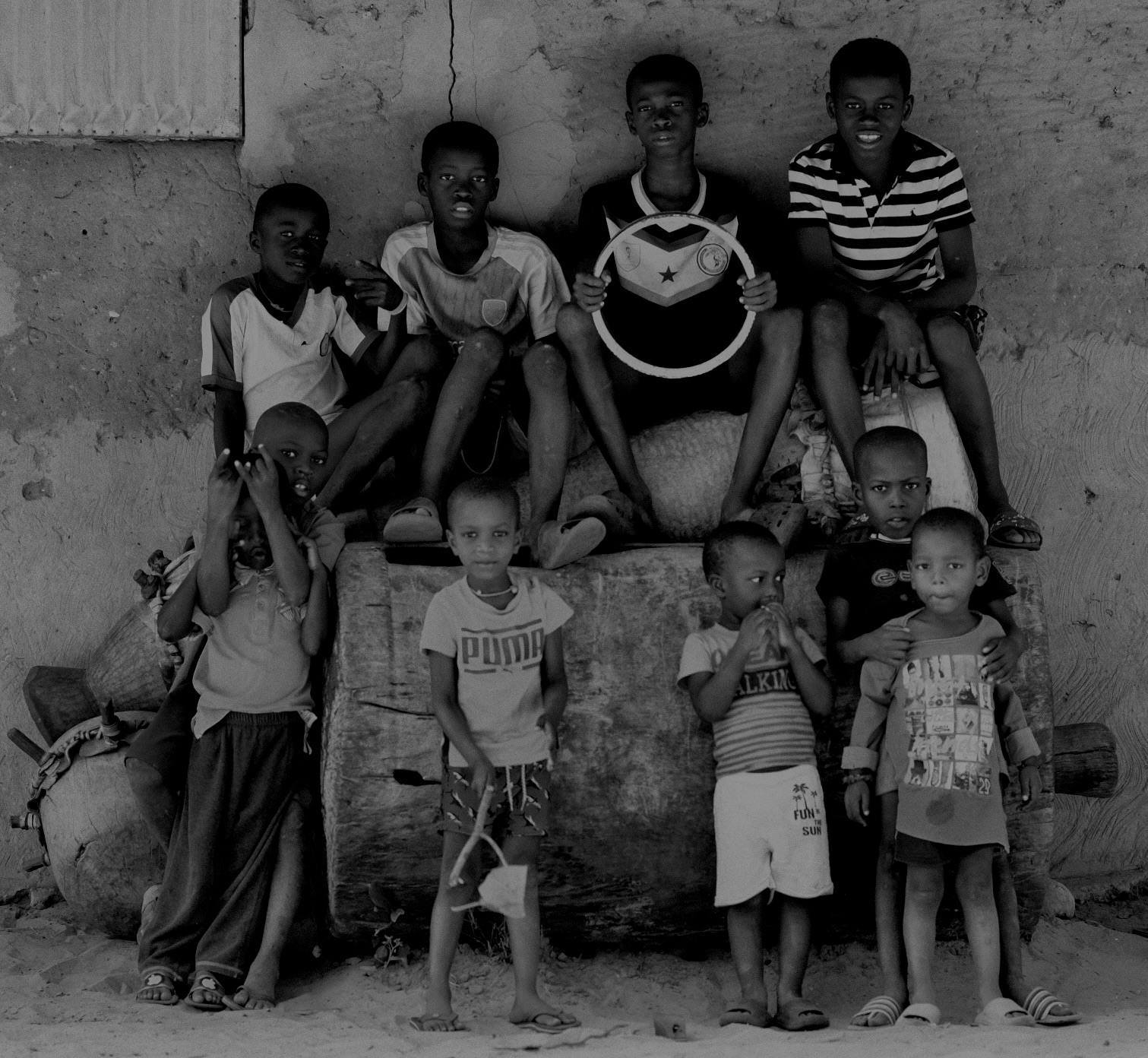
The village children

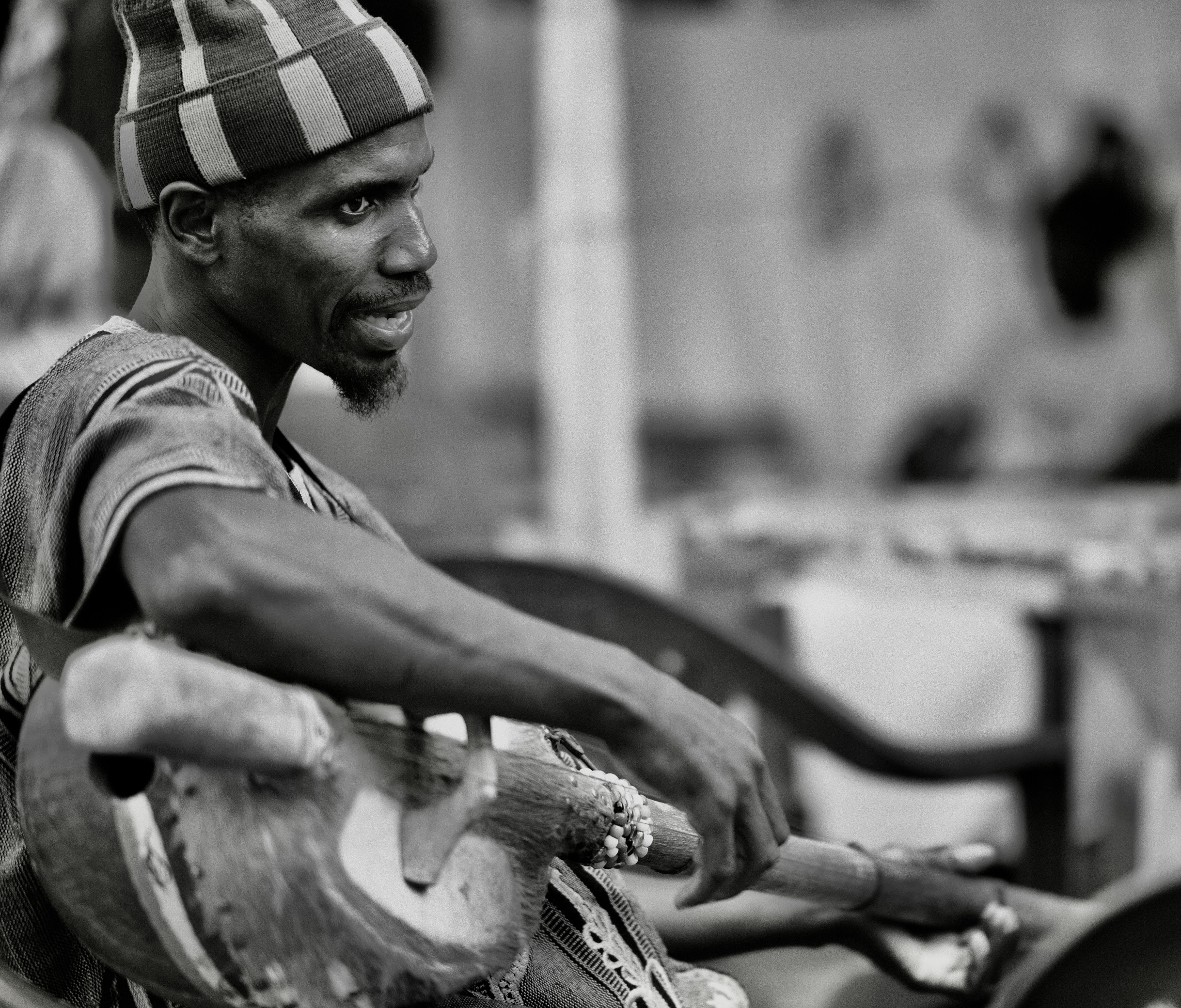
A musician

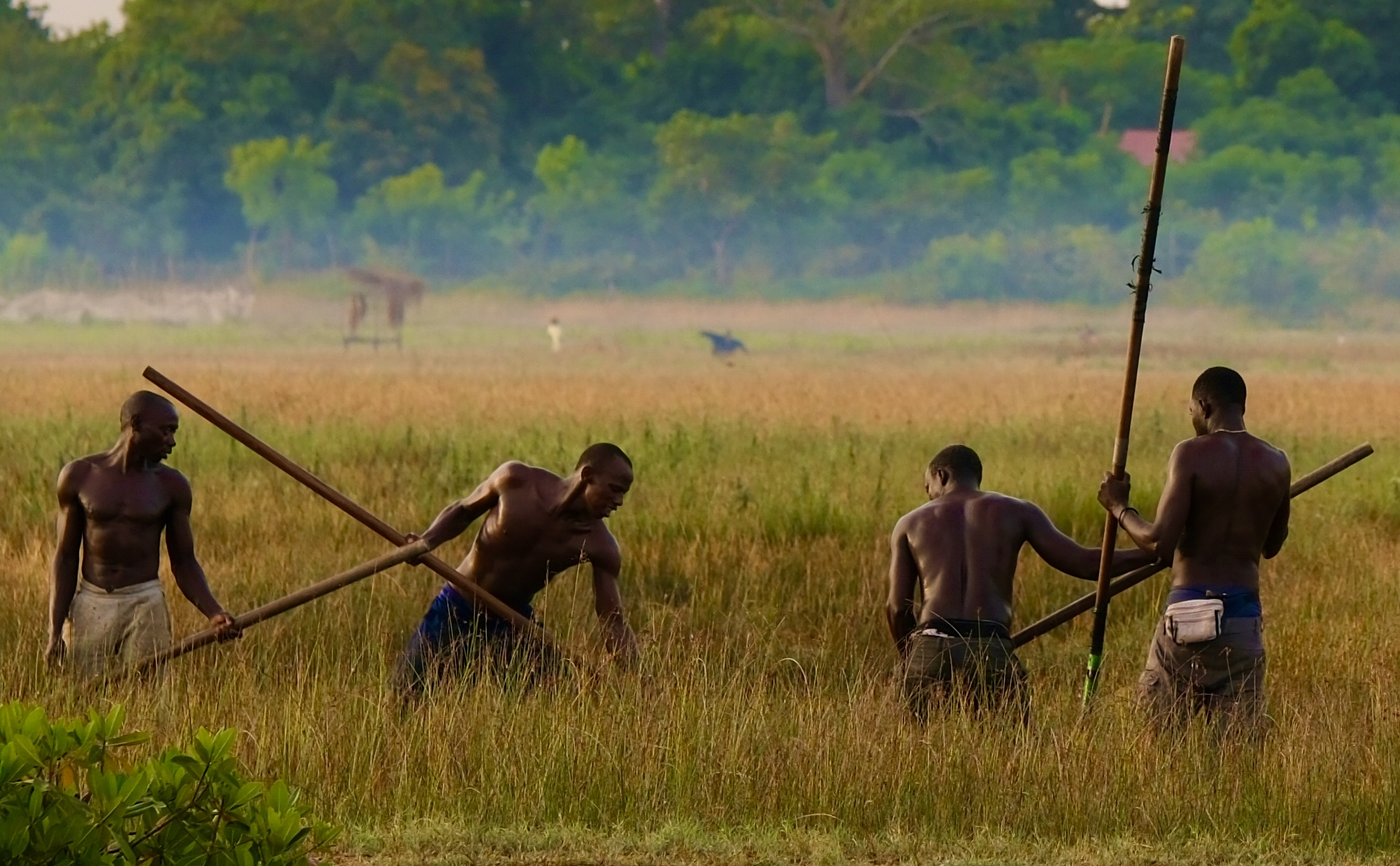
People in the rice fields

== Bibliography ==
- Jean Girard (1969). Genèse du pouvoir charismatique en Basse-Casamance, Sénégal (in French). Dakar: IFAN. p. 364.
- Schwarz-Bart, Simone; Schwarz-Bart, André; Rejouis, Rose-Myriam (2003). In Praise of Black Women: Modern African women. Univ of Wisconsin Press. ISBN 978-0-299-17270-1.
