= Mossor =

Mossor is a surname. Notable people with the surname include:

- Earl Mossor (1925–1988), American baseball player
- Stefan Mossor (1896–1957), Polish general

== See also ==
- Mosser
- Mossoró, city in Brazil
