= Oussouye department =

Coordinates: 12°29′06″N 16°32′49″W

Oussouye
- Department
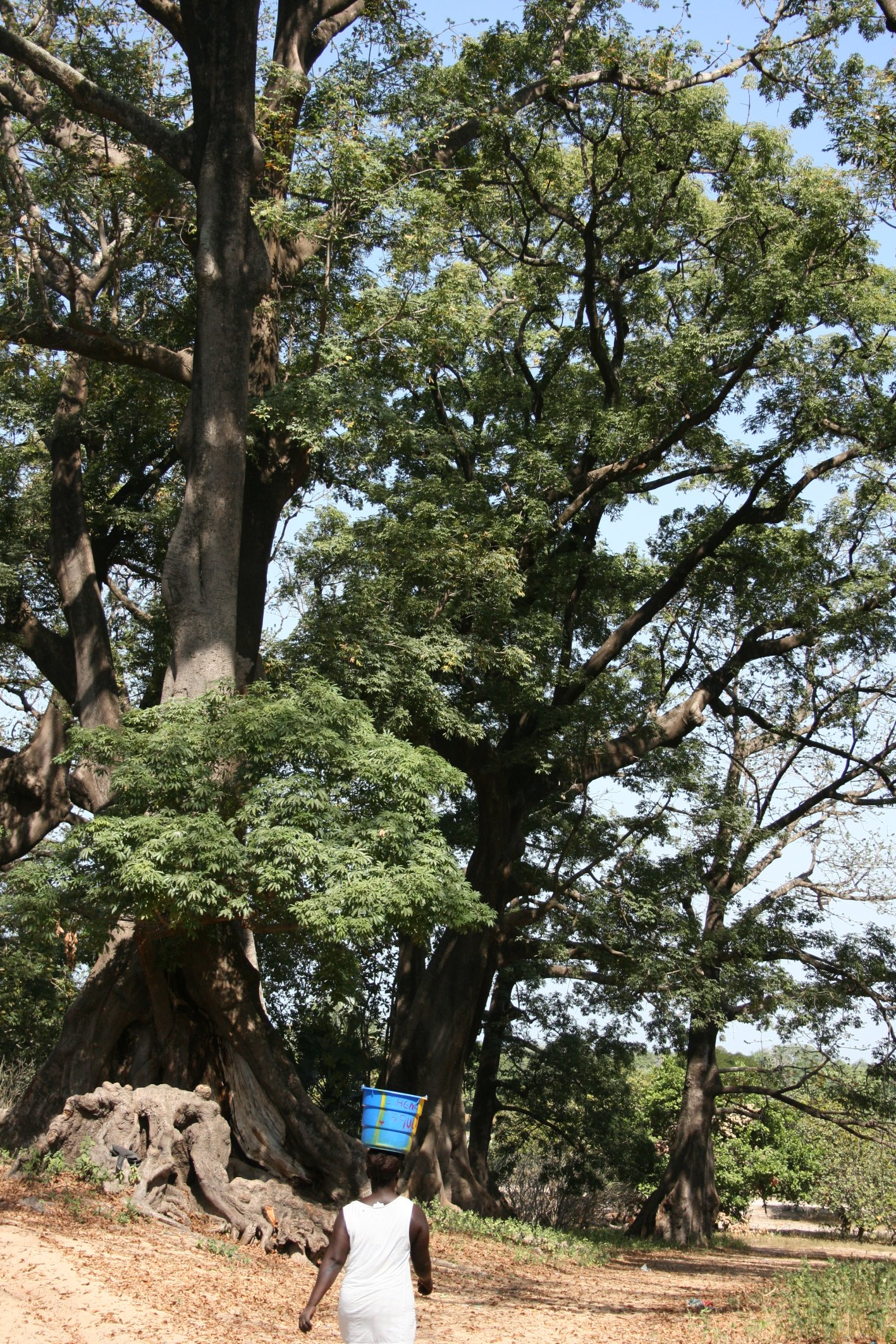
- Fromager (Kapok) trees at Diembéring

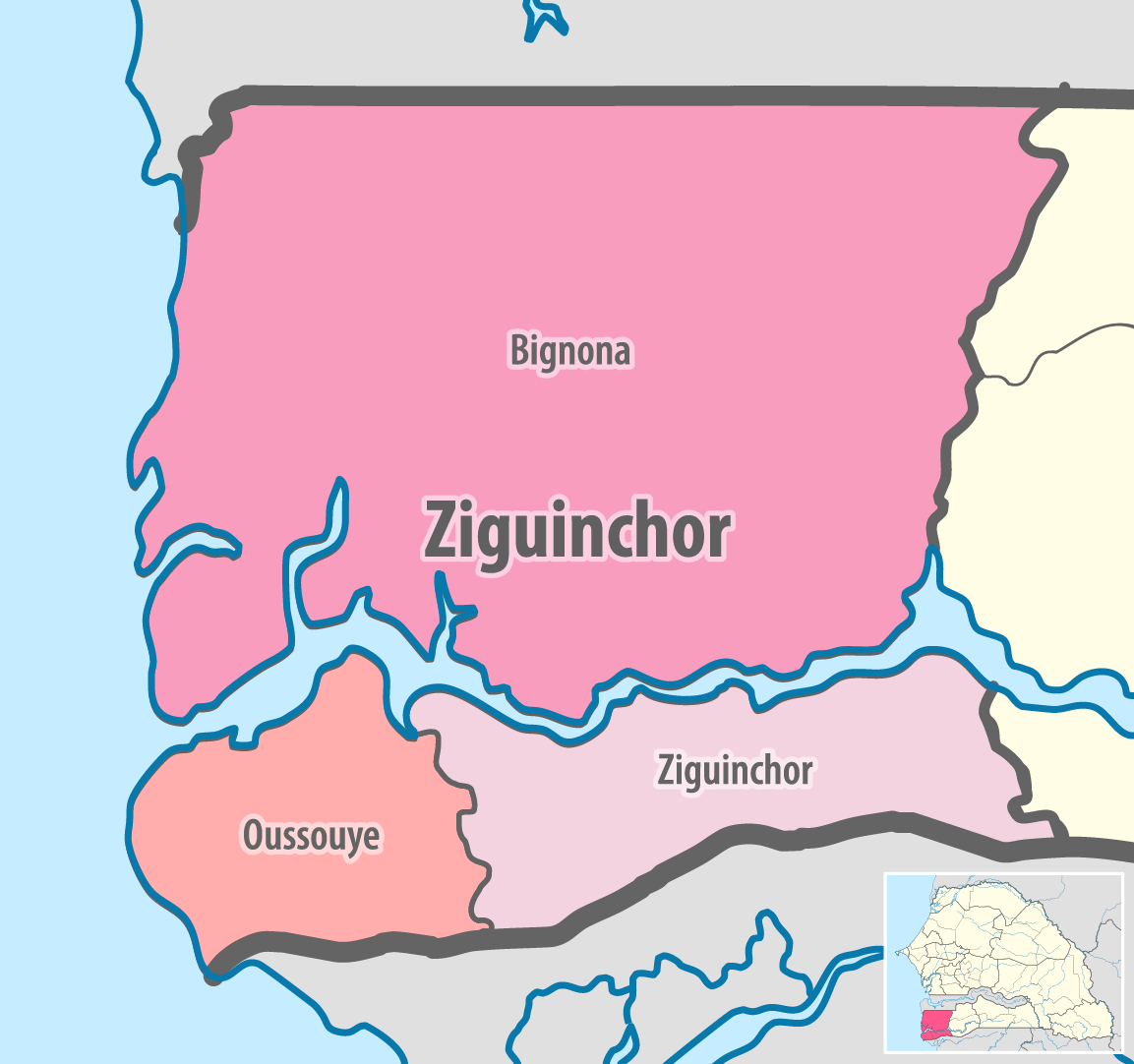
- Location in the Ziguinchor region
- Country: Senegal
- Region: Ziguinchor region
- Capital: Oussouye

Area
  - Total: 891 km^{2} (344 sq mi)

Population (2023 census)
  - Total: 52,883
  - Density: 59.4/km^{2} (154/sq mi)
- Time zone: UTC+0 (GMT)

Oussouye department is one of the departments of Senegal, located in the Ziguinchor region. It is situated in Basse Casamance, on the right bank of the mouth of the Casamance River.

== Administration ==
Oussouye is its main village, which is also the only commune of the department.

It is divided in two arrondissements made up of rural districts (communautés rurales):

- Cabrousse Arrondissement
  - Diembéring
  - Santhiaba Manjacque
- Loudia Ouolof Arrondissement
  - Mlomp
  - Oukout

=== Historic sites ===
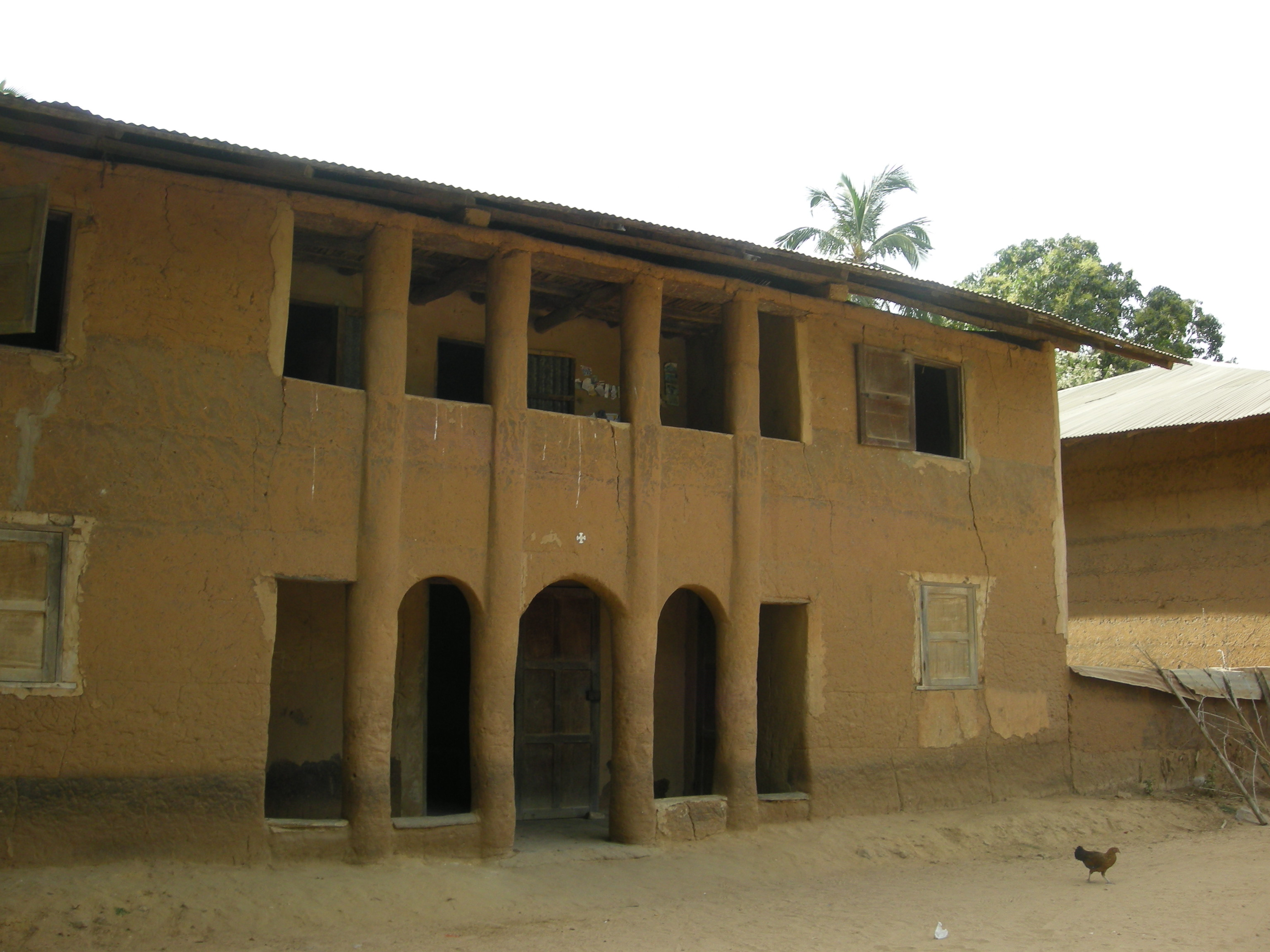
Multistorey houses at Mlomp

- Karabane, historic centre, Loudia Arrondissement
- Residence of the Prefect at Oussouye
- 100-year-old fromager (kapok) trees of Kagnout
- Wells of El Hadj Umar Tall at Elinkine, Loudia Arrondissement. (Water was found where he threw his rosary, according to legend)
- multistorey houses at Mlomp

== Economy ==
The most important economic activities are farming (especially rice farming in the mangrove zone), tourism and fishing. Oussouye is one of the biggest touristic centers in Senegal, with seaside resorts like Cap-skirring and Djimbéring. Fishing is also an important source of revenue thanks to the existence of the mangrove ecosystem.
