= Climate change and food security in Africa =

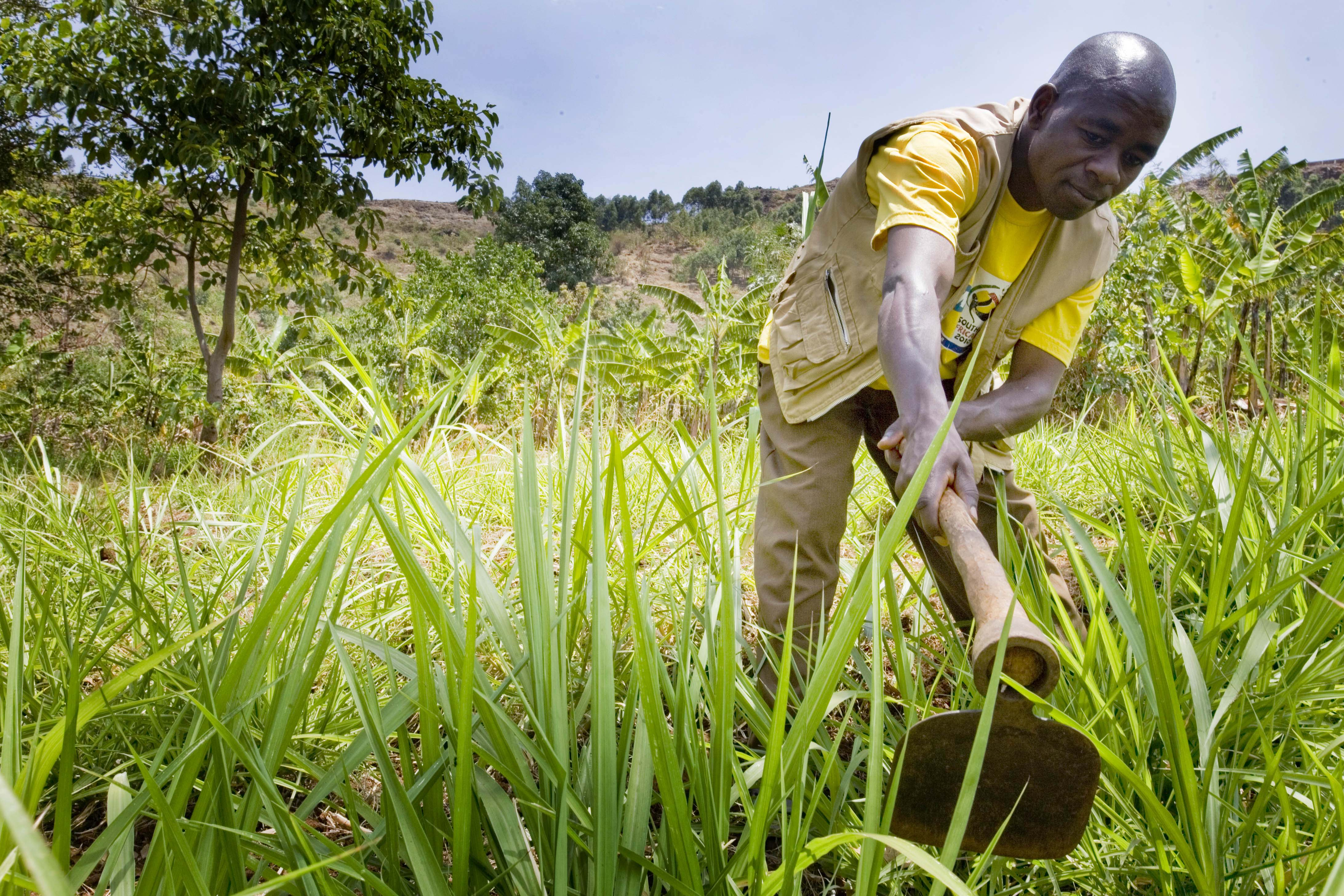
African food security: A Ugandan man tends to his garden in Arokwo Village, Kapchorwa, Uganda in 2009 (Kate Holt/AusAID)

Climate change in Africa is reducing its food security. Climate change at the global, continental, and sub-continental levels has been observed to include an increase in air and ocean temperatures, sea-level rise, a decrease in snow and ice extent, an increase and decrease in precipitation, changes in terrestrial and marine biological systems, and ocean acidification. The agricultural industry is responsible for more than 60% of full-time employment in Africa. Millions of people in Africa depend on the agricultural industry for their economic well-being and means of subsistence. A variety of climate change-related factors such as worsening pests and diseases that damage agriculture and livestock, altered rainfall patterns, rising temperatures, droughts, and floods are having a negative impact on the agricultural industry in Africa. Many African populations access to food is being impacted by these climate change effects on the agricultural industry, which result in a trend of decreasing crop yields, animal losses, and rising food prices.

== Effects of climate change on African food security ==
Scientists and researchers studying the Western Central African region have found evidence that the forest-savannah region was once a mature rainforest around 3,000 years ago. Some studies have suggested that anthropogenic factors contributed to replacing the rainforest with more desert-like land, mainly due to the migration and expansion of native African farmers. Exponential population growth and rapid urbanization threaten the environment, leading to deforestation, habitat destruction, and ecosystem disruption. Changes in naturally occurring ecosystems result in variations in the distribution of different animal species. The variation in distribution patterns across species differs among seasons and specific species' life cycles. It may exhibit random variability in distribution over time.

Since 1961 in Africa, anthropogenic climate change has been attributed to a 34% loss in agricultural total factor productivity, which measures agricultural production as well as livestock. The reduction in crop yields brought on by altered precipitation patterns and increased temperatures is one of the most significant effects because it causes variable periods of drought and flooding.

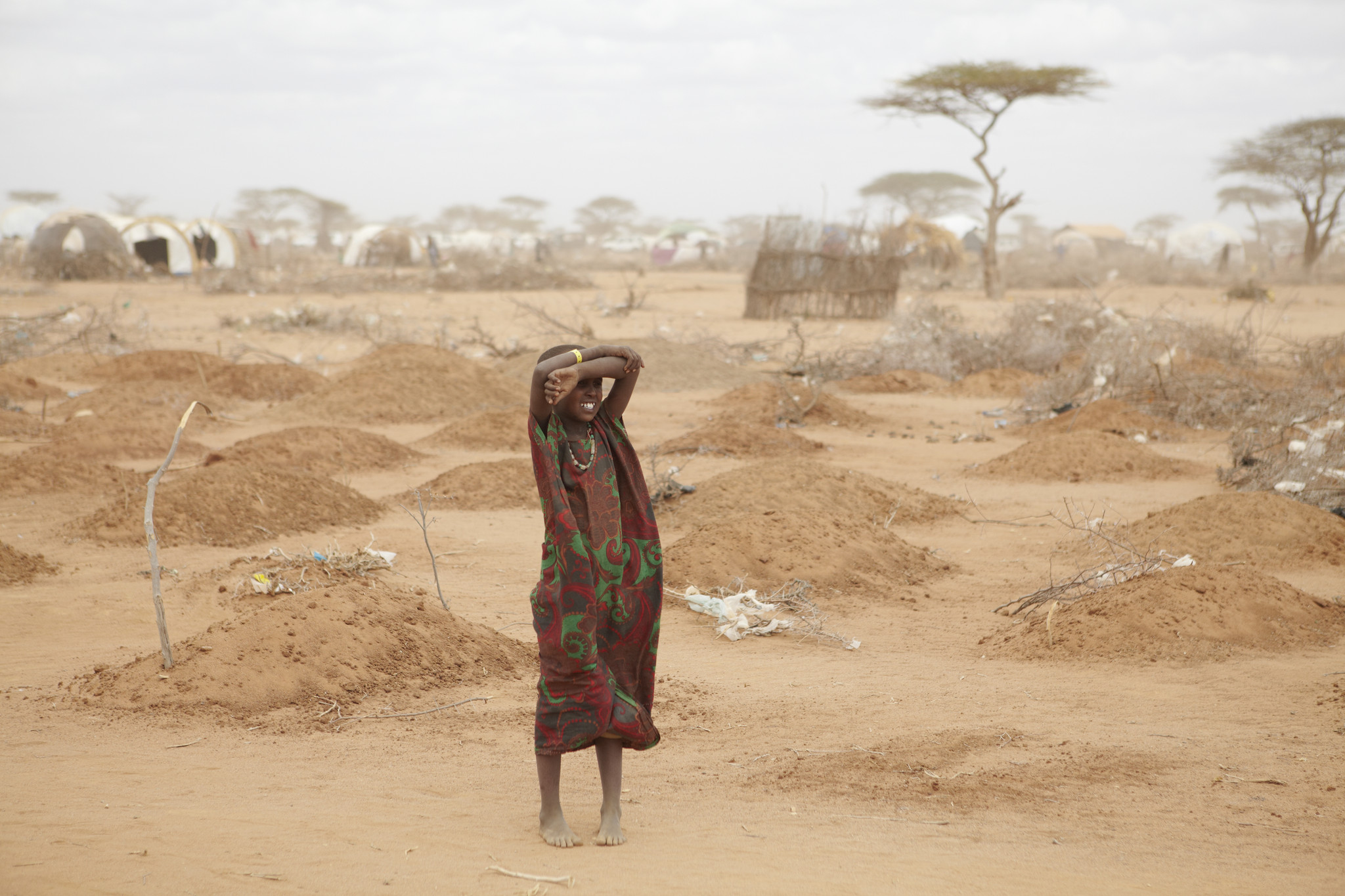
A mass grave for children fleeing drought and famine in Somalia in 2011. They perished from malnutrition on the way to or shortly after arriving to the refugee camp, 'Dadaab', in Kenya.

In 2010–2011, Somalia, a country on the Horn of Africa, experienced the East African Drought, which led to mass livestock fatality, and poor crop harvests. During the famine (October 2010- April 2012), the FAO (Food and Agriculture Organization) estimated that Somalia experienced around 258,000 deaths attributable to the emergency, 52% of which were estimated to be children. Somalia experienced drought again starting in 2020 and continuing through 2023, resulting in millions of livestock deaths, and poor/ failed harvests from 5 consecutive missed rainy seasons. The WHO (World Health Organization) estimated that in 2022, 43,000 people died in Somalia because of the drought.

The El Niño weather effect can severely alter climate in Africa, having the strongest effect on precipitation, it caused by the shifting of warm water in the Pacific Ocean, and was responsible for widespread drought, crop loss, and food insecurity in Southern Africa between 2015 and 2017. In a statement in 2016, the SADC (Southern African Development Community), comprising 16 member states in Southern Africa, estimated that around 40 million people within Southern Africa were experiencing or at risk of experiencing food insecurity because of the El Niño event, they also estimated that 9.3 million tonnes of cereal crops were lost.

As a result of climate change, droughts have become more common, rainfall patterns have become more erratic, and other extreme weather events have occurred. These events have disrupted agricultural cycles and decreased crop yields. According to recent research, agricultural productivity in Sub-Saharan Africa is strongly impacted by climate change. The results of a study conducted in 2022 and looking at thirty countries in the region revealed that increasing malnutrition rates correlate with increased levels of greenhouse gas emissions, which indicates a loss in food security. The research underscores the necessity of formulating adaptive strategies to mitigate the adverse effects of these elements.

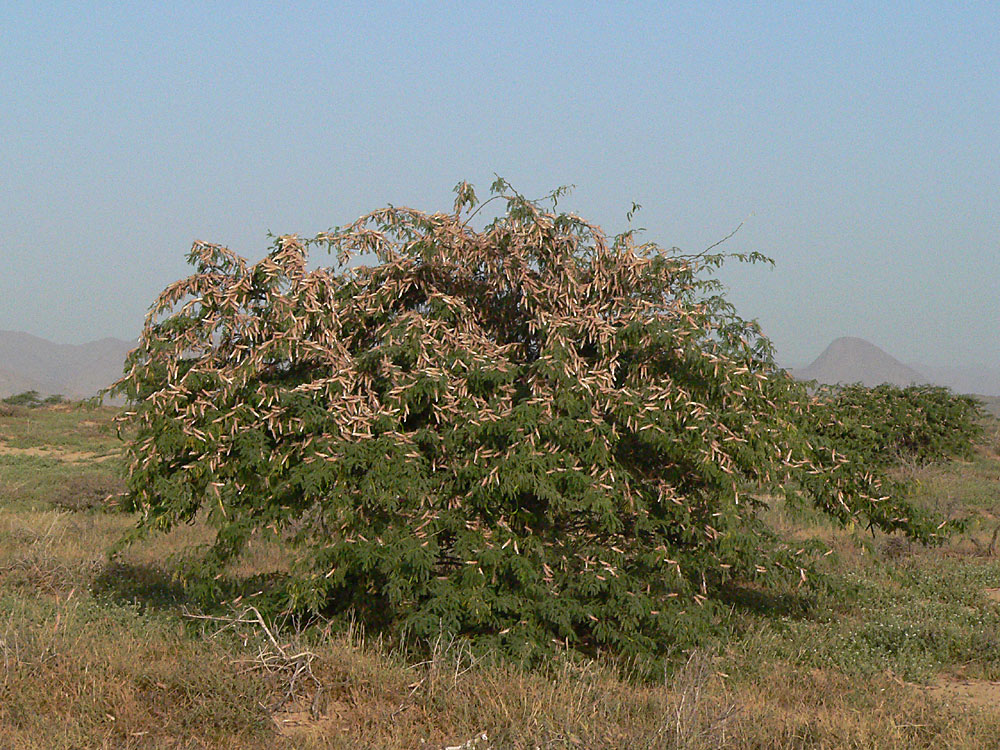
A Desert Locust (Schistocerca Gregaria) swarm photographed in Sudan. A relatively small swarm of Desert Locust, around the size of a square kilometer, can eat as much vegetation as 35,000 people.

Climate change has also boosted the prevalence of pests and illnesses, endangering agricultural output and livestock production. In 2020 and 2021 East Africa experienced a Desert Locust crisis, the worst of which Kenya and Uganda had seen for 70 years, that was caused by extreme weather events in the form of two tropical cyclones and increased precipitation in the region that provided circumstances apt for breeding. Desert Locust swarms consume crop land at an alarming rate, a study conducted by the FAO in 2020 surveyed 7800 households in Uganda, and found that 15% of all households reported over 75% of their crop had been damaged due to the swarms. Between 2003 and 2005 the Sahel region of Africa experienced a Desert Locust upsurge, which the FAO estimated to be responsible for an 80-100% loss in cereal crops, and an 85-90% loss in leguminous crops, in the countries Mauritania, Burkina Faso, and Mali. The FAO estimated that 8,380,000 people from the countries Burkina Faso, Mali, Mauritania, Niger, Senegal, and Chad were affected in some capacity from the upsurge.

Similar to agriculture, for many people in Africa, livestock is a vital source of food, income, and labor, which increases these communities vulnerability too, and exacerbates the food security situation. In Nigeria and Kenya, drought and desertification are destroying grazing land at an increasing rate, leading to competition and violent conflict between livestock owners over grazeland. Many Africans now find it difficult to afford food due to rising food prices brought on by these losses, as of 2020, 77% of the population of Sub-Saharan Africa cannot afford to eat a healthy diet. Additionally, because of the nutrition needs of adolescent women compared to men, more expensive foods are required to meet the nutrition baseline. Because of the increasing lack of these foods, in some places in Africa like Ghana, the cost for a nutrition adequate diet for women is three times that of a similar aged man. Climate change poses a serious challenge to food security in Africa, where agricultural yields have been gradually dropping, and where population growth and increased demand for food, water, and forage increase the possibility of hunger and under-nutrition.

== Impact of climate change on animal health ==
Climate change primarily affects agriculture in Africa, and in many African countries, small-scale farmers dominate the field. For example, about 90% of farm holdings and their farms are typically less than 2 hectares in size. In terms of livestock, most of these farmers in northern Ghana care for small animals like sheep and goats.

Climate change will likely decrease biodiversity and challenge food security. Climate change and global warming directly and indirectly affect the health of livestock. Indirectly, climate change increases the severity and duration of droughts in Africa, which lead to crop failures and increased water scarcity, both of which affect animal productivity and reproduction rates. Regarding animal health, studies have shown that temperature changes affect the occurrence of infectious diseases within livestock by shifting food webs, changes in lifecycle timing, and changes in weather patterns that will shape the transmission pathways and frequency of communicable diseases. For example, some studies have shown a positive correlation between rising temperatures in Africa and the spread of arthropod vectors like Culicoides imicola (a midge species) that transmits blue-tongue virus to ruminant animals (e.g., sheep, cattle, and goat).

Additionally, there is a positive association between extreme weather events like droughts and El Niño/southern oscillation (ENSO) patterns and the incidence of infectious diseases in animals has been observed, like Rift Valley fever in East Africa. While vector-borne and waterborne diseases are of great concern, the frequency of gastrointestinal infections will likely rise. Climate change also increases the risk of avian influenza virus outbreaks as wild migratory waterfowl (the natural reservoirs for most AIVs) travel long distances along different pathways for migration. Environmental factors influence the behavior and migration of the waterfowl, resulting in shifts in the timing and path of movement, shifts in expansion, shifts in distribution, and increasing the length of the breeding season. The change in the behaviors and migration patterns of waterfowls provides more opportunities for disease transmission between species and viral rearrangement, leading to antigenic variation and the emergence of new strains.

In addition to an increase in infectious diseases, the health of animals is affected by climate change through other mechanisms, such as increased heat stress, exposure to contaminants and extreme weather conditions, limited natural resources affecting daily living, and changes in how animals interact with the environment.

Heat stress experienced by animals is associated with premature death and reduced reproduction and productivity. Additionally, heat stress causes metabolic derangements in the body, oxidative stress, and suppresses the endocrine and immune systems, leading to increased susceptibility to diseases. Animals' exposure to toxic environmental contaminants can also affect these systems. Changes in food webs, melting snow and icecaps, and organic carbon cycling all influence the pollutants in water, soil, air, and plants. Specifically, flooding mobilizes contaminants and disperses them onto grazing lands, exposing animals to harmful toxicants.

Additionally, alterations in the distribution and amount of pests influence how frequently pesticides are used and, thus, how often they contaminate the environment. Furthermore, higher temperatures may affect the biotransformation of contaminants, producing more bioactive metabolites. Some studies suggest contaminants can interact with parasitic or infectious diseases, creating a dangerous synergistic effect.

== Africa's vulnerability to climate change related food insecurity ==
The main sources of Africa's 3.6% share of the world's Carbon dioxide emissions are gas flaring in the Niger Delta and coal-fired power plants in South Africa. But, the continent's forests are rapidly disappearing because of desertification and deforestation, which has negative consequences for both Africa and the climate at large. Despite having very low carbon dioxide emissions in comparison to other places, Africa is more vulnerable than other continents to the damaging effects of climate change because of its unique vulnerabilities and reliance on climate sensitive resources.

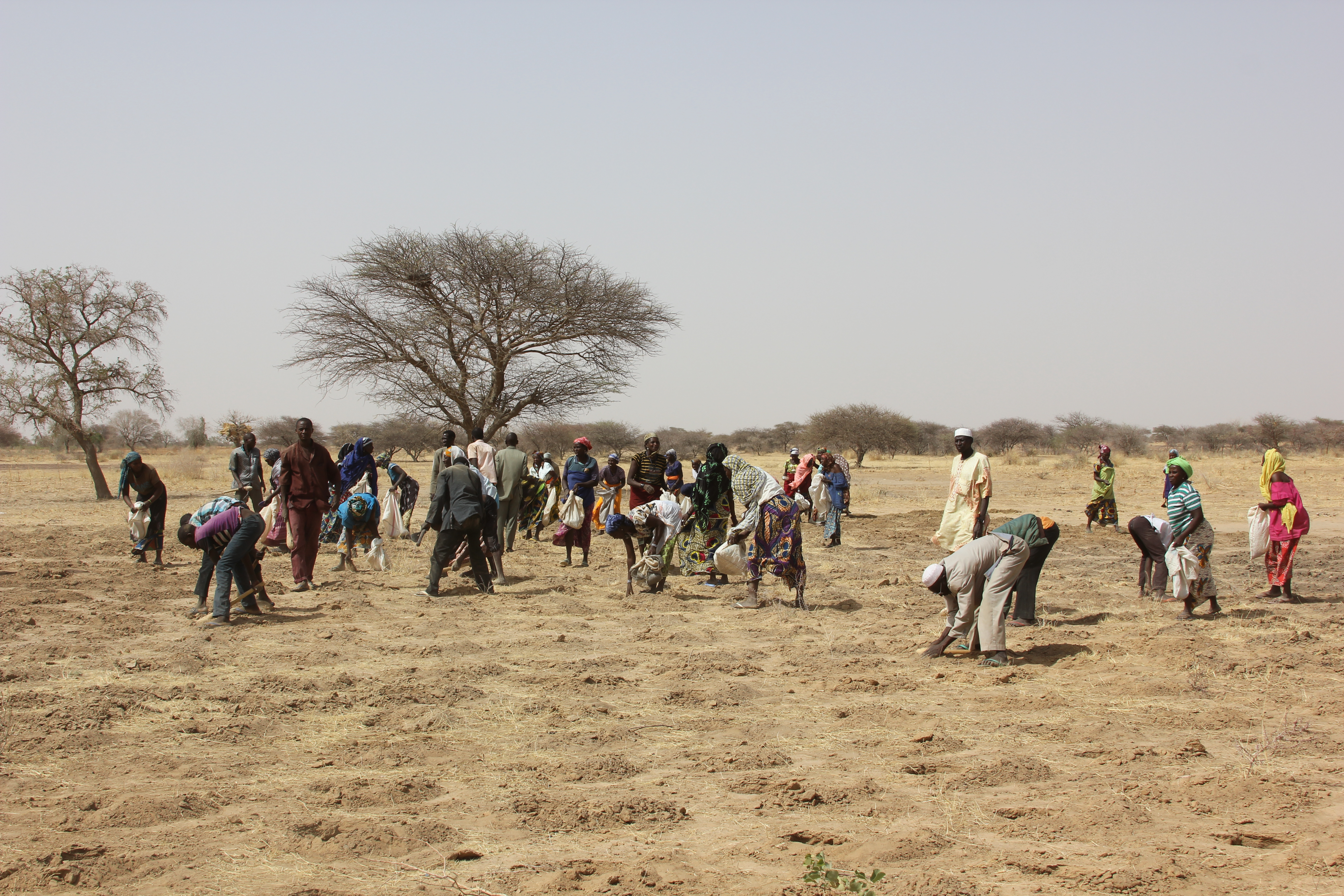
Rain-fed agriculture in the Sahelian country of Niger. Captured near the cities of Maradi and Zinder, in southern Niger.

In West Africa's arid and semi-arid regions, dry terrain or desert makes up three-quarters of the continent's surface. The Sahel is a region that stretches from East Africa to West Africa, and is a transition zone between the dry Sahara Desert in North Africa to wetter areas in the south. Economic activity in the Sahel is largely dependent on climate-sensitive industries, such as rain-fed agriculture and Forestry, which are responsible for over 60% of employment as well as 40% of the regions GDP. A study in 2014 on local communities near the Kahuzi-Biega National Park near Bukavu in the Democratic Republic of the Congo, found that 94% percent of respondents relied on rain-fed agriculture for income. Agriculture contributes around 70% of employment, 30% of GDP, and 50% of exports in a rain-fed economy.

All countries combined, Africa relies on imports to meet around 85% of the food requirements of its countries citizens. Therefore, Africa is highly vulnerable to food price shocks, and especially crop price seasonality, which climate change is expected to further worsen. A study measured the percentage of seasonal gap in food prices in 13 different foods, in 7 African countries (Burkina Faso, Ethiopia, Ghana, Malawi, Niger, Tanzania, and Uganda) between 2000 and 2012. The study found that maize experienced a 33.1% seasonal price gap and sorghum and millet to have 22% and 20.1% seasonal gaps, however, the largest seasonal price gaps could be found in fruit and vegetables, such as tomatoes (60.8%). The agriculture industry serves as a safety net for rural poor people. People are increasingly susceptible since drought and flooding are more frequent and intense in many areas, including the nations surrounding the Rift Valley, the plains of Mozambique, Senegal, and The Gambia.

== African food security and climate change adaptation strategies ==
Numerous adaptation measures are being implemented in Africa to mitigate the impact of climate change on food security. To adapt to the variability of environmental conditions due to climate change, farmers in northern Ghana have adopted traditional or Indigenous strategies like crop mixing, crop rotation, livestock production, growing short-duration crops, and monoculture. To maintain healthy soil for crops, farmers have adopted practices like making mounds, regular weeding, land rotation, and separating plant matter. One specific traditional adaptation strategy is predicting the onset of the rainy seasons and early or late sowing of crops. Many farmers have also adopted introduced adaptation strategies, including technologies created to improve soil conditions or protect crops, such as using inorganic fertilizers, compost, herbicides, and insecticides. Recommended agricultural adaptation strategies that farmers use are harrowing, conservation agriculture, sowing in rows, and farming during recommended periods.

Most countries prioritize strategies to mitigate the impact of climate change on agriculture focus on human and environmental health while neglecting the impact that extreme weather events have on animal health. Among the most crucial strategies is the development and adoption of climate-resilient agricultural techniques. This involves utilizing crops that are resistant to drought, enhancing soil and water conservation, and utilizing integrated pest management. Additionally, diversifying sources of income is another adaptive technique that can be employed. Many African communities rely heavily on a single food or livestock source, making them particularly vulnerable to climate change impacts. By diversifying income sources, such as through off-farm revenue-generating activities, a buffer against climate shocks can be created. Furthermore, enhancing food distribution and storage methods may contribute to reduced food waste and increased food availability. Farmers may invest in climate-resilient practices and technologies by having better access to credit and financial services.

A 2022 study analyzing panel data from the Horn of Africa found that a 1% increase in mean temperature leads to a 0.357% rise in food insecurity, while a 1% increase in precipitation results in a 0.023% decrease in food insecurity. The authors concluded that climate change adversely affects food security in the region and recommended adopting high-temperature and drought-resistant crop varieties to mitigate these effects.

== Regional Case Study: Horn of Africa ==
The study found that Ethiopia and Somalia experience disproportionately higher food insecurity levels due to recurring droughts and conflict-related displacement. Climate extremes in 2022 pushed 56.8 million people in 12 countries into acute food insecurity, highlighting the significant impact of climate related events on food insecurity. Food insecurity catastrophes will continue to occur, and the change to realize zero hunger by 2030 will be lost.

The following adaptation strategies are being developed by individuals, groups, and institutions to mitigate climate change risks:

- Climate-smart agriculture production
- Diversification of sources of income and alternative livelihoods
- Decentralization of local resource control
- Alternative eco-friendly energy sources
- Infrastructure development
- Information on the climate
- Early warning systems
- Insurance program
