= Climate change in Africa =

Emissions, impacts and responses of the African continent related to climate change

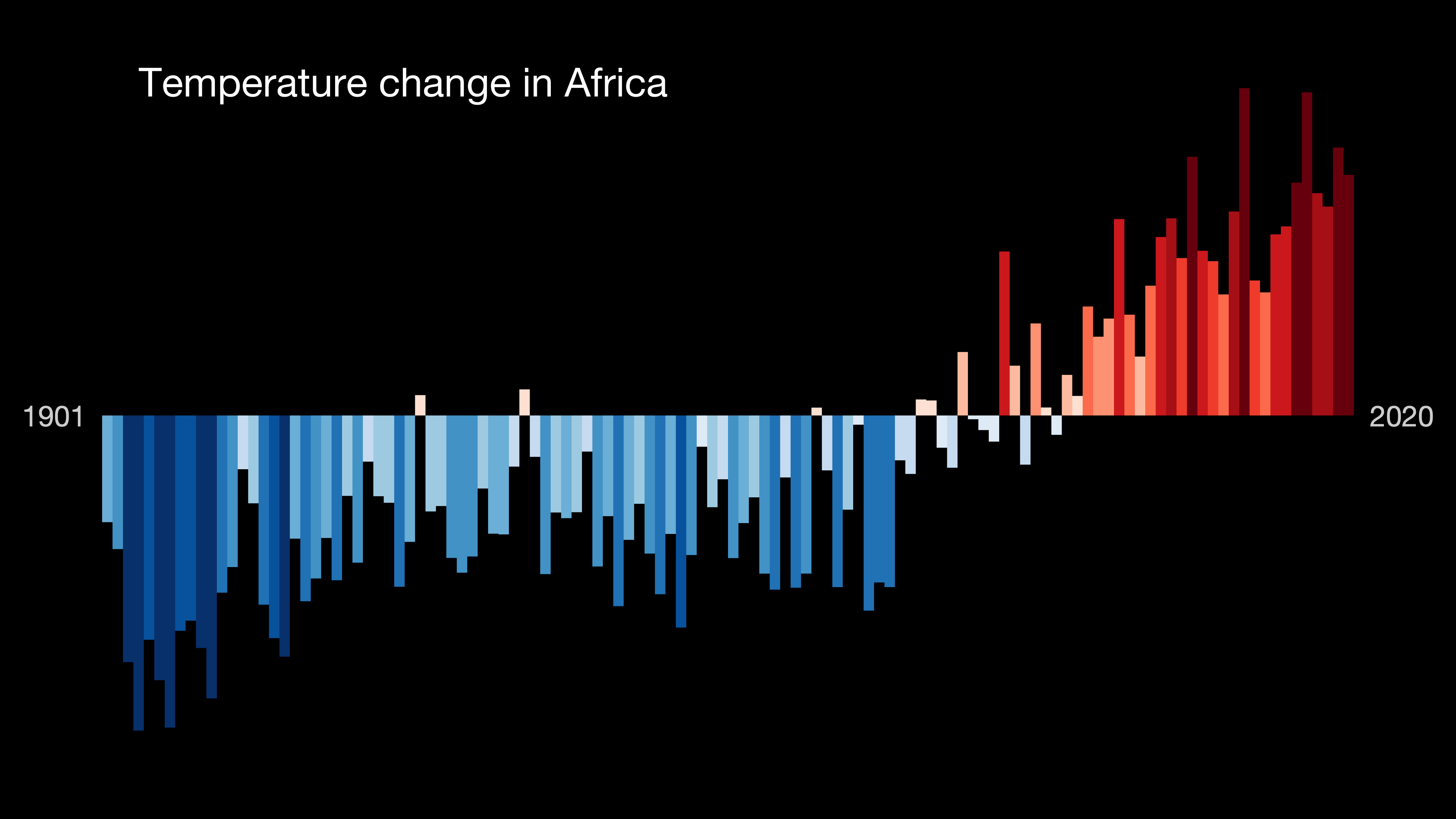
Graph showing temperature change in Africa between 1901 and 2021, with red colour being warmer and blue being colder than average (The average temperature during 1971–2000 is taken as the reference point for these changes.)

Climate change in Africa is a serious threat because the continent is one of the most vulnerable regions to the effects of climate change, despite being responsible for less than 4% of global greenhouse gas emissions. Climate change is causing increasingly erratic rainfall patterns, more frequent extreme weather events such as droughts and floods, and rising sea-surface temperatures across the continent. These changes threaten food and water security, biodiversity, public health, and economic development. Africa is currently warming faster than the rest of the world on average.

Climate change intensifies existing socioeconomic vulnerabilities. Large segments of the African population depend on climate-sensitive livelihoods such as agriculture (55 - 62% of the workforce in sub-Saharan Africa) and already live in poverty, heightening their exposure to shocks. Health outcomes worsen as heat stress, vector-borne diseases (such as malaria and dengue), and malnutrition become more prevalent. Over half (56%) of the over 2,000 recorded public health incidents in Africa between 2001 and 2021 were connected to climate change. Resource scarcity contributes to displacement and conflict, particularly in fragile regions. Urban areas, often characterized by informal settlements, face heightened risks from flooding and extreme heat.

Agriculture is one of the most vulnerable sectors, as most African farmers rely on rainfed crops. Reduced and unpredictable rainfall, combined with higher temperatures, drives soil moisture loss, desertification (especially in the Sahara) and shifts suitable growing areas. These changes lower yields of staple crops, undermining food security and worsening hunger. Livestock health is increasingly compromised by heat stress and shifting disease patterns. Coastal and marine ecosystems face warming seas and rising levels, which threaten fisheries and densely populated coastal settlements.

The economic toll of climate change is severe. On average African countries face climate-related losses amounting to 2-5% of GDP annually, while adaptation costs in sub-Sahran Africa are projected at USD 30-50 billion per year over the next decade. This threatens development gains and places pressure on governments and international institutions to mobilise climate finance.

Africa's climate change adaptation strategies focus on building resilience through climate-smart agriculture, sustainable water management, ecosystem conservation, and strengthening health and infrastructure systems. These approaches prioritise enhancing governance, mobilising climate finance and investment, and fostering community participation to address vulnerability holistically. Continental and national frameworks emphasise multi-sectoral coordination, technology adoption, and capacity building to support sustainable development and reduce climate risks.

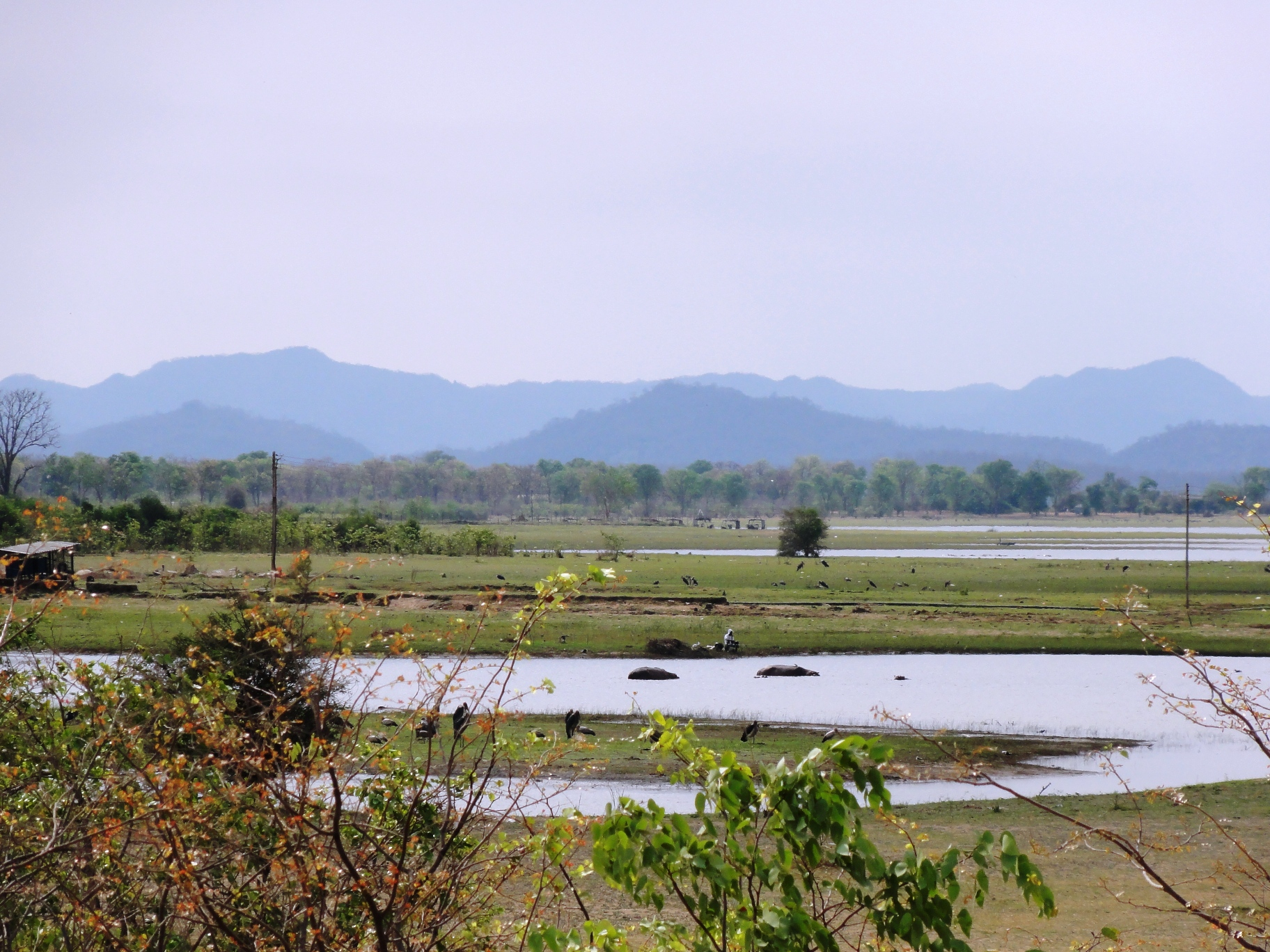
Lake kariba

== Greenhouse gas emissions ==
Africa's per person greenhouse gas emissions are low compared to other continents. Emissions from land use change are uncertain, especially in Central Africa. The main source of uncertainty comes from carbon dioxide fluxes in the LULUCF sector (this acronym stands for land use, land-use change, and forestry).

== Impacts ==
=== Temperature and weather changes ===
Köppen climate classification map for Africa for 1991–2020

2071–2100 map under the most intense climate change scenario. Mid-range scenarios are currently considered more likely.

Observed surface temperatures have generally increased over Africa since the late 19th century to the early 21st century by about 1 °C, but locally as much as 3 °C for minimum temperature in the Sahel at the end of the dry season. The warming of Africa has increased by +0.3 C from 1991 to 2021 versus +0.2 during 1961 to 1910. It is estimated that by 2030, the people of Africa will be exposed to a rise in sea level due to an increase in temperature. This will then cause agricultural productivity to decrease. Observed precipitation trends indicate spatial and temporal discrepancies as expected. The observed changes in temperature and precipitation vary regionally.

Current climate models (as summarised in the IPCC Sixth Assessment Report) predict increases in frequency and intensity of drought and heavy rainfall events. They also predict decreases in mean precipitation almost everywhere in Africa, with medium to high confidence. However, local rainfall trends and socio-climatic interactions are likely to manifest in mixed patterns. Therefore, the converging impacts of climate change will vary across the continent. In rural areas, rainfall patterns influence water usage.

A study in 2019 predicted increased dry spell length during wet seasons and increased extreme rainfall rates in Africa. In other words: "both ends of Africa's weather extremes will get more severe". The research found that most climate models will not be able to capture the extent of these changes because they are not convection-permitting at their coarse grid scales.

=== Sea level rise ===
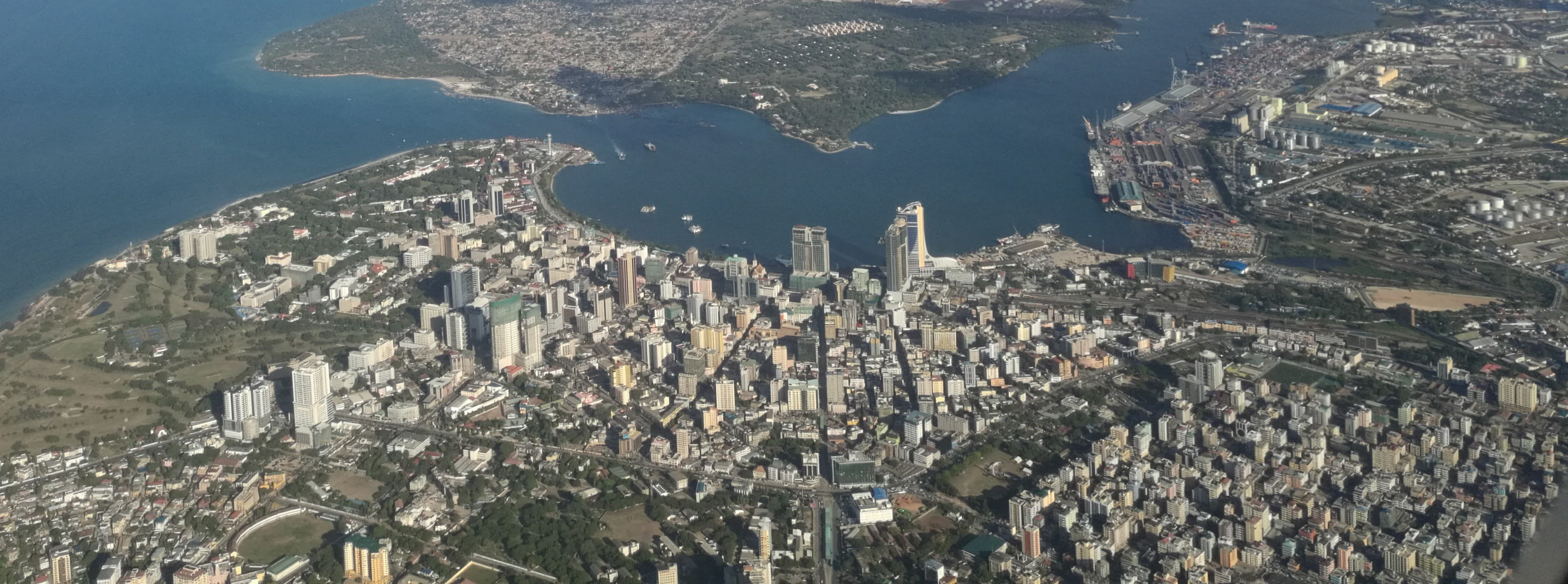
Aerial view of the Tanzanian capital Dar es Salaam

In Africa, future population growth amplifies risks from sea level rise. Some 54.2 million people lived in the highly exposed low elevation coastal zones (LECZ) around 2000. This number will effectively double to around 110 million people by 2030. By 2060 it will be around 185 to 230 million people, depending on the extent of population growth. The average regional sea level rise will be around 21 cm by 2060. At that point climate change scenarios will make little difference. But local geography and population trends interact to increase the exposure to hazards like 100-year floods in a complex way.

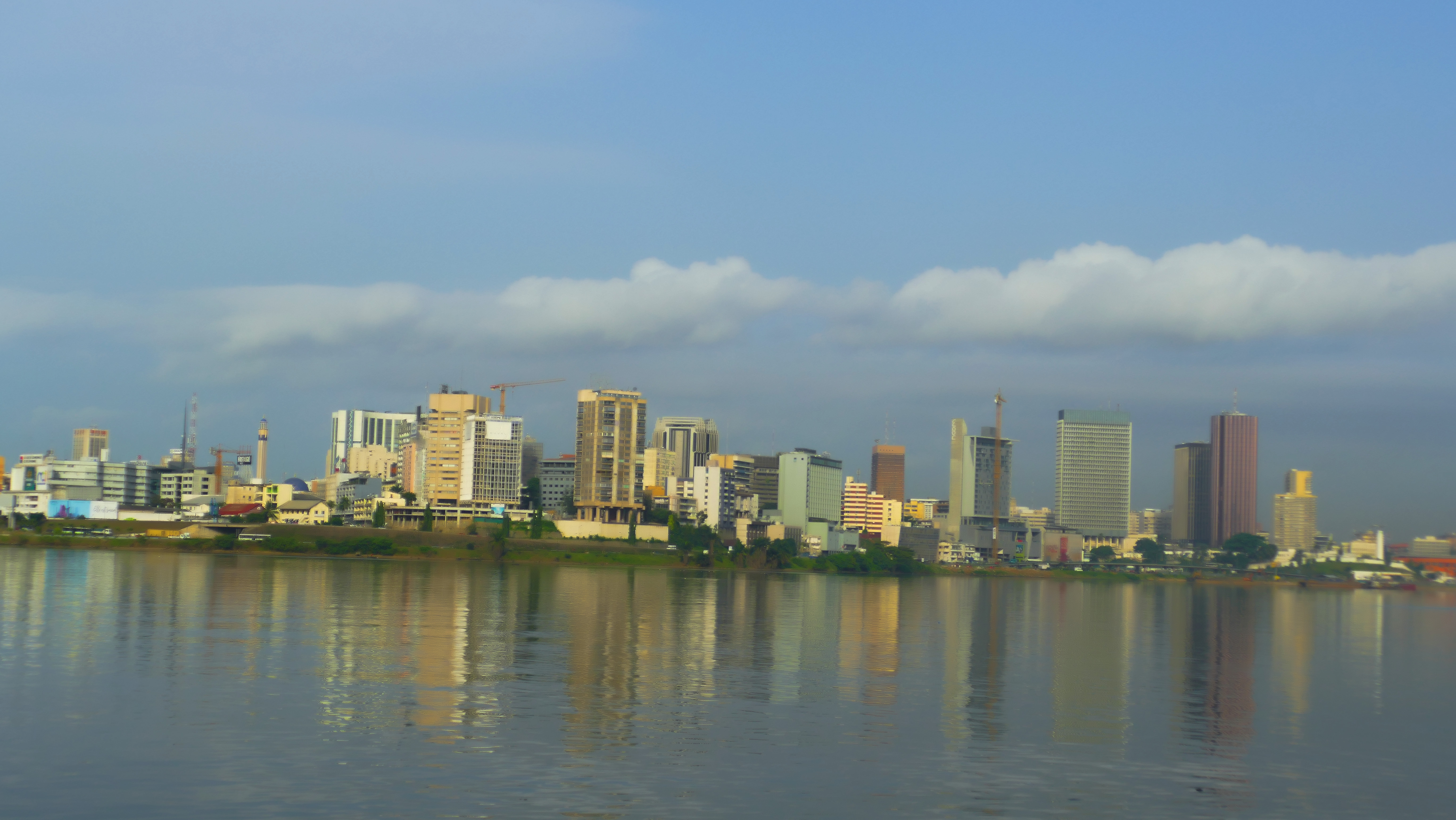
Abidjan, the economic powerhouse of Ivory Coast

Populations within 100-year floodplains. (Note: In millions of people. The second and third columns include both the effects of population growth and the increased extent of floodplains by that point.)
Country	2000	2030	2060	Growth 2000–2060 (Note: The increase in area's population and the highest plausible scenario of population growth.)
Egypt	7.4	13.8	20.7	0.28
Nigeria	0.1	0.3	0.9	0.84
Senegal	0.4	1.1	2.7	0.76
Benin	0.1	0.6	1.6	1.12
Tanzania	0.2	0.9	4.3	2.3
Somalia	0.2	0.6	2.7	1.7
Côte d'Ivoire	0.1	0.3	0.7	0.65
Mozambique	0.7	1.4	2.5	0.36

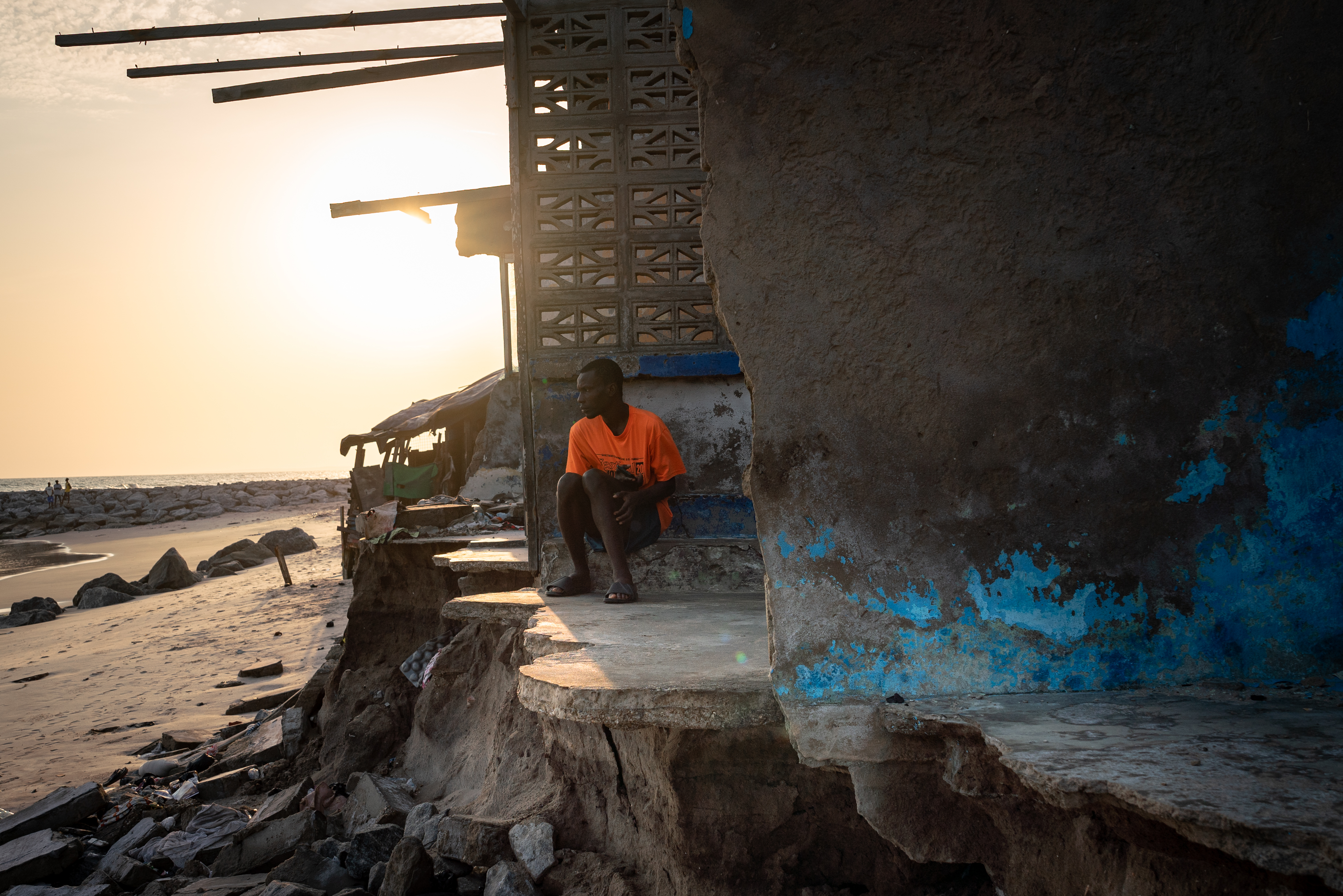
A man looking out over the beach from a building destroyed by high tides in Chorkor, a suburb of Accra. Sunny day flooding caused by sea level rise, increases coastal erosion that destroys housing, infrastructure and natural ecosystems. A number of communities in Coastal Ghana are already experiencing the changing tides.

In the near term, some of the largest displacement is projected to occur in the East Africa region. At least 750,000 people there are likely to be displaced from the coasts between 2020 and 2050. Scientific studies estimate that 12 major African cities would collectively sustain cumulative damages of US$65 billion for the "moderate" climate change scenario RCP4.5 by 2050. These cities are Abidjan, Alexandria, Algiers, Cape Town, Casablanca, Dakar, Dar es Salaam, Durban, Lagos, Lomé, Luanda and Maputo. Under the high-emission scenario RCP8.5 the damage would amount to US$86.5 billion. The version of the high-emission scenario with additional impacts from high ice sheet instability would involve up to US$137.5 billion in damages. The damage from these three scenarios accounting additionally for "low-probability, high-damage events" would rise to US$187 billion, US$206 billion and US$397 billion respectively. In these estimates, the Egyptian city of Alexandria alone accounts for around half of this figure. Hundreds of thousands of people in its low-lying areas may already need relocation in the coming decade. Across sub-Saharan Africa as a whole, damage from sea level rise could reach 2–4% of GDP by 2050. However this figure depends on the extent of future economic growth and adaptation.

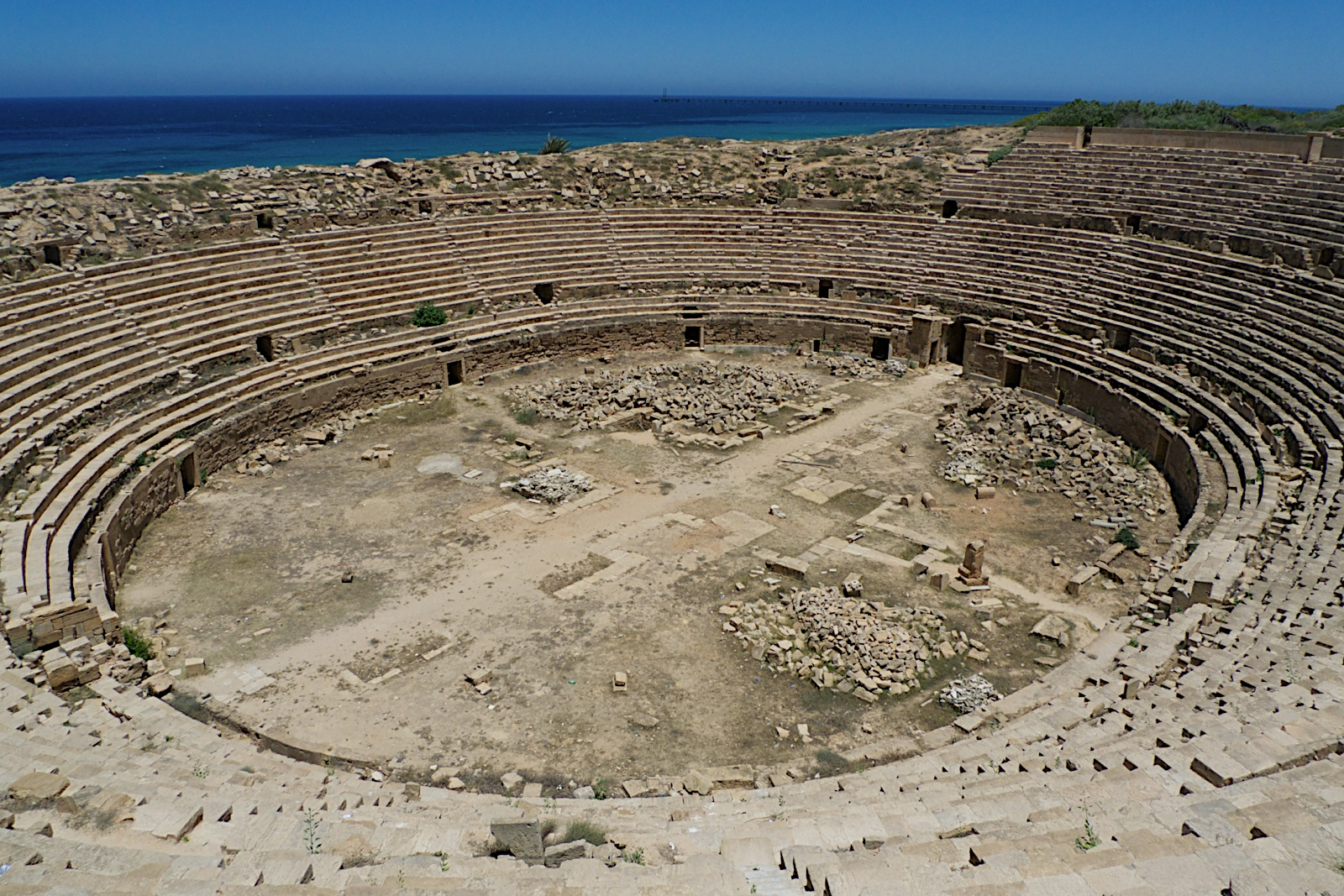
The remains of Leptis Magna amphitheater, with the sea visible in the background

In the longer term, Egypt, Mozambique and Tanzania are likely to have the largest number of people affected by annual flooding amongst all African countries. This projection assumes global warming will reach 4 °C by the end of the century. That rise is associated with the RCP8.5 scenario. Under RCP8.5, 10 important cultural sites would be at risk of flooding and erosion by the end of the century. These are the Casbah of Algiers, Carthage Archaeological site, Kerkouane, Leptis Magna Archaeological site, Medina of Sousse, Medina of Tunis, Sabratha Archaeological site, Robben Island, Island of Saint-Louis and Tipasa. A total of 15 Ramsar sites and other natural heritage sites would face similar risks. These are Bao Bolong Wetland Reserve, Delta du Saloum National Park, Diawling National Park, Golfe de Boughrara, Kalissaye, Lagune de Ghar el Melh et Delta de la Mejerda, Marromeu Game Reserve, Parc Naturel des Mangroves du Fleuve Cacheu, Seal Ledges Provincial Nature Reserve, Sebkhet Halk Elmanzel et Oued Essed, Sebkhet Soliman, Réserve Naturelle d'Intérêt Communautaire de la Somone, Songor Biosphere Reserve, Tanbi Wetland Complex and Watamu Marine National Park.

== Socioeconomic impacts ==
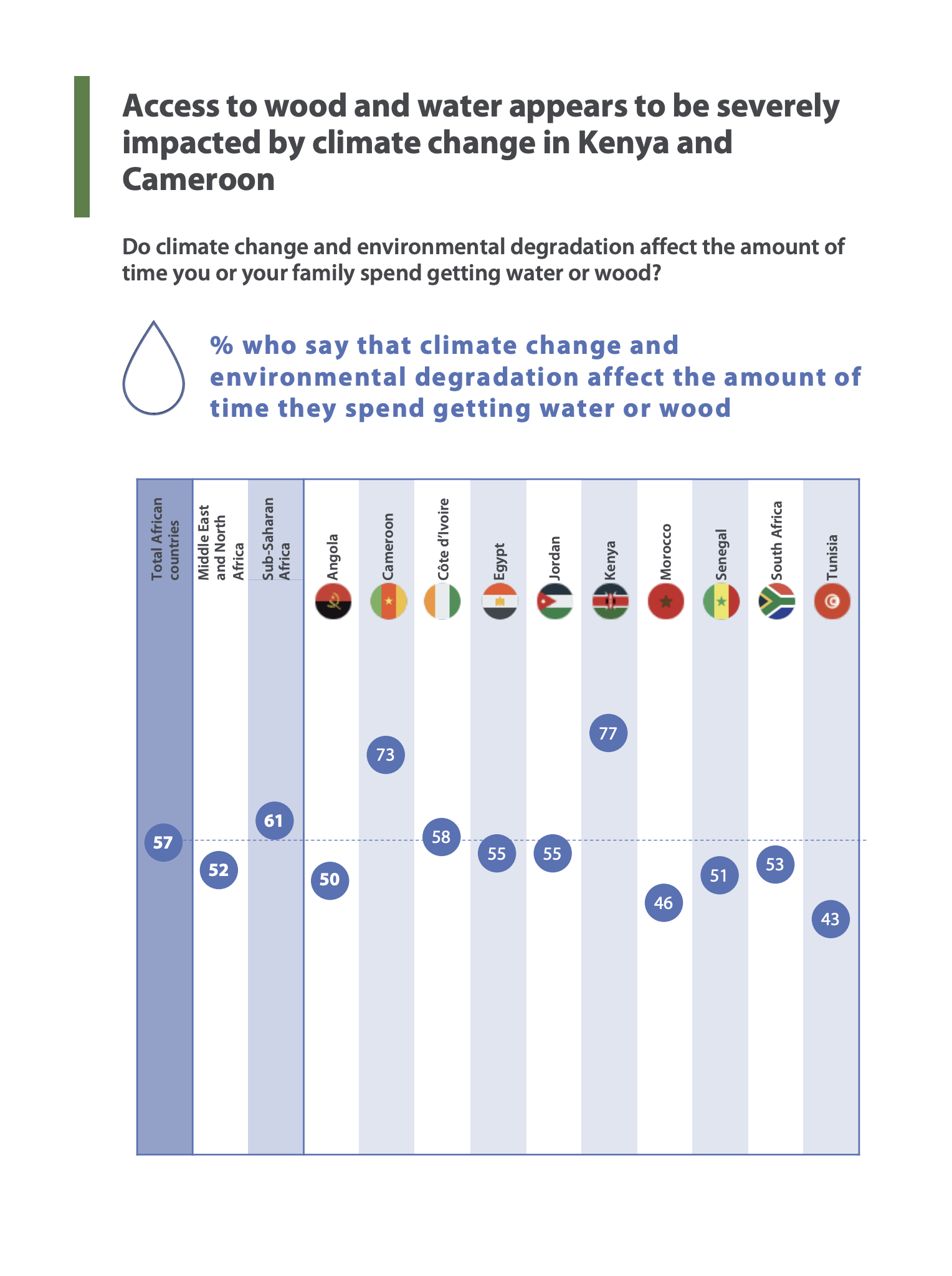
Survey results from 2022 show that access to wood and water appears to be severely impacted by climate change in Kenya and Cameroon.

Climate change will increasingly impact Africa due to many factors. These impacts are already being felt and will increase in magnitude if action is not taken to reduce global carbon emissions. The impacts include higher temperatures, droughts, changing rainfall patterns, and increased climate variability. These conditions have a bearing on energy production and consumption. The recent drought in many African countries, which has been linked to climate change, adversely affected both energy security and economic growth across the continent.

Africa will be one of the regions most impacted by the adverse effects of climate change. Reasons for Africa's vulnerability are diverse and include low levels of adaptive capacity, poor diffusion of technologies, and information relevant to supporting adaptation, and high dependence on agro-ecosystems for livelihoods. Many countries across Africa are classified as Least-Developed Countries (LDCs) with poor socio-economic conditions, and by implication are faced with particular challenges in responding to the impacts of climate change.

Pronounced risks identified for Africa in the IPCC's Fifth Assessment Report relate to ecosystems, water availability, and agricultural systems, with implications for food security.

In 2022, over 6,000 respondents from ten African nations took part in a climate survey conducted by the European Investment Bank. The survey found that 88% of respondents claimed climate change was hurting their lives, while 61% of respondents claimed that environmental destruction has impacted their income or source of livelihood. These losses are usually the result of severe drought, increasing sea levels or coastal erosion, or extreme weather events like floods or storms.

More than half of African respondents (57%) said that they or people they know have already made steps to adapt to the effects of climate change. Among these measures are investments in water-saving devices to mitigate the effects of drought and drain clearance ahead of flooding. 34% of all African respondents said climate change is one of the most pressing issues confronting their country, among other key issues such as inflation and access to health care.

=== Economic impacts ===
Africa is warming faster than the rest of the world on average. Large portions of the continent may become uninhabitable as a result and Africa's gross domestic product (GDP) may decline by 2% as a result of a 1 °C rise in average world temperature, and by 12% as a result of a 4 °C rise in temperature. Crop yields are anticipated to drastically decrease as a result of rising temperatures and it is anticipated that heavy rains would fall more frequently and intensely throughout Africa, increasing the risk of floods.

Additionally, Africa loses between $7 billion and $15 billion a year due to climate change, projected to reach up to $50 billion by 2030.

==== Agriculture ====
Agriculture is a particularly important sector in Africa, contributing towards livelihoods and economies across the continent. Many people rely on the agriculture as a way to build themselves economically and a source of food. Many rely on climate sensitive resources. It is projected that crop activity will decrease across Sub-Saharan Africa. On average, agriculture in Sub-Saharan Africa contributes 15% of the total GDP. Africa's geography makes it particularly vulnerable to climate change, and 70% of the population rely on rain-fed agriculture for their livelihoods. Smallholder farms account for 80% of cultivated lands in Sub-Saharan Africa. The IPCC in 2007 projected that climate variability and change would severely compromise agricultural productivity and access to food. This projection was assigned "high confidence". Cropping systems, livestock and fisheries will be at greater risk of pest and diseases as a result of future climate change. Crop pests already account for approximately 1/6th of farm productivity losses. Climate change will accelerate the prevalence of pests and diseases and increase the occurrence of highly impactful events. The impacts of climate change on agricultural production in Africa will have serious implications for food security and livelihoods. The lack of diverse nutrition caused a failure to ingest certain essential nutrition. The lack of these nutrition can cause deficiency in vitamin A and iron. This was very common to see during the times of droughts and lack of foods because options were few. Between 2014 and 2018, Africa had the highest levels of food insecurity in the world.

In relation to agricultural systems, heavy reliance on rain-fed subsistence farming and low adoption of climate smart agricultural practices contribute to the sector's high levels of vulnerability. The situation is compounded by poor reliability of, and access to, climate data and information to support adaptation actions. Observed and projected disruptions in precipitation patterns due to climate change are likely to shorten growing seasons and affect crop yield in many parts of Africa. Furthermore, the agriculture sector in Africa is dominated by smallholder farmers with limited access to technology and the resources to adapt.

Climate variability and change have been and continue to be the principal source of fluctuations in global food production across developing countries where production is highly rain-dependent. The agriculture sector is sensitive to climate variability, especially the inter-annual variability of precipitation, temperature patterns, and extreme weather events (droughts and floods). These climatic events are predicted to increase in the future and are expected to have significant consequences to the agriculture sector. This would have a negative influence on food prices, food security, and land-use decisions. Yields from rainfed agriculture in some African countries could be reduced by up to 50% by 2020. To prevent the future destructive impact of climate variability on food production, it is crucial to adjust or suggest possible policies to cope with increased climate variability. African countries need to build a national legal framework to manage food resources in accordance with the anticipated climate variability. However, before devising a policy to cope with the impacts of climate variability, especially to the agriculture sector, it is critical to have a clear understanding of how climate variability affects different food crops. This is particularly relevant in 2020 due to the severe invasion of Locusts adversely affecting agriculture in eastern Africa. The invasion was partially attributed to climate change – the warmer temperature and heavier rainfall which caused an abnormal increase in the number of locusts.

In East Africa, climate change is anticipated to intensify the frequency and intensity of drought and flooding, which can have an adverse impact on the agricultural sector. Climate change will have varying effects on agricultural production in East Africa. Research from the International Food Policy Research Institute (IFPRI) suggest an increase in maize yields for most East Africa, but yield losses in parts of Ethiopia, Democratic Republic of Congo (DRC), Tanzania and northern Uganda. Projections of climate change are also anticipated to reduce the potential of the cultivated land to produce crops of high quantity and quality.

Climate change in Kenya is expected to have large impacts on the agricultural sector, which is predominantly rain-fed and thus highly vulnerable to changes in temperature and rainfall patterns, and extreme weather events. Impacts are likely to be particularly pronounced in the arid and semi-arid lands (ASALs) where livestock production is the key economic and livelihood activity. In the ASALs, over 70% of livestock mortality is a result of drought. Over the next 10 years, 52% of the ASAL cattle population are at risk of loss because of extreme temperature stress.

Climate change will exacerbate the vulnerability of the agricultural sector in most Southern African countries which are already limited by poor infrastructure and a lag in technological inputs and innovation. Maize accounts for nearly half of the cultivated land in Southern Africa, and under future climate change, yields could decrease by 30%. Temperatures increases also encourage a wide spread of weeds and pests.

Climate change will significantly affect agriculture in West Africa by increasing the variability in food production, access and availability.

Higher rainfall intensity, prolonged dry spells and high temperatures are expected to negatively impact cassava, maize and bean production in Central Africa. Floods and erosion occurrence are expected to damage the already limited transportation infrastructure in the region leading to post harvest losses. Exportation of economic crops like coffee and cocoa are on the rise within the region but these crops are highly vulnerable to climate change. Conflicts and political instability have had an impact on agriculture contribution to the regional GDP and this impact will be exacerbated by climatic risks.

Africa's gross domestic product (GDP) may decline by 2% as a result of a 1 °C rise in average world temperature, and by 12% as a result of a 4 °C rise in temperature. Crop yields are anticipated to drastically decrease as a result of rising temperatures and an increase in the likelihood of drought throughout the continent. Additionally, it is anticipated that heavy rains would fall more frequently and intensely throughout Africa, increasing the risk of floods.

==== Energy ====
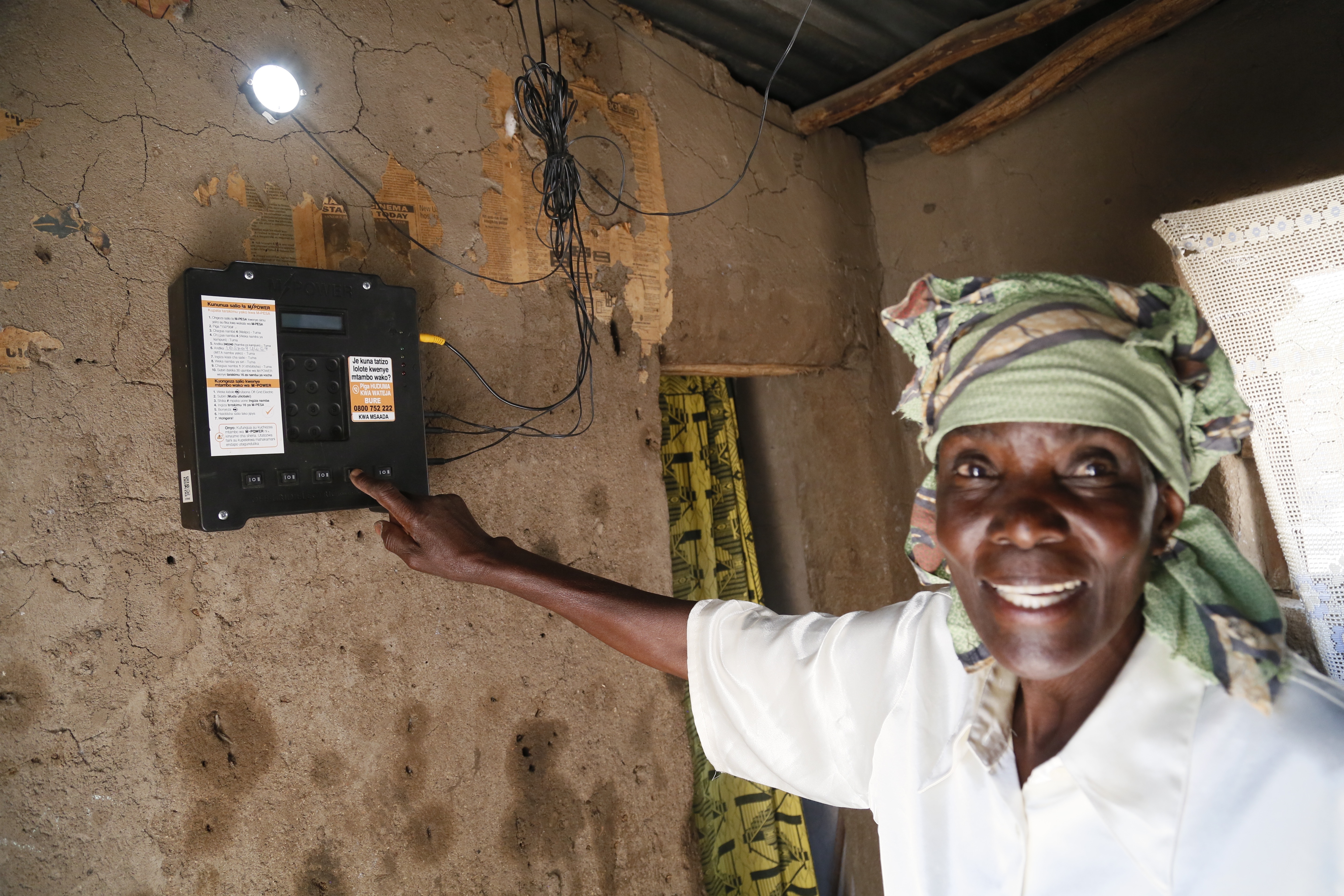
Solar lighting and electricity installed in the home of a Tanzanian woman.

With increasing population and corresponding energy demand, energy security must be addressed because energy is crucial for sustainable development. Climate change has affected energy sectors in Africa as many countries depend on hydropower generation. Decreasing rainfall levels and droughts have resulted in lower water levels in dams with adverse impacts on hydropower generation. This has resulted in low electrical energy production, high cost of electricity and power outages or load-shedding in some African countries that depend on hydroelectric power generation. Disruptions in hydropower generation have negatively affected various sectors in countries such as Ghana, Uganda, Kenya, and Tanzania.

== Water scarcity ==
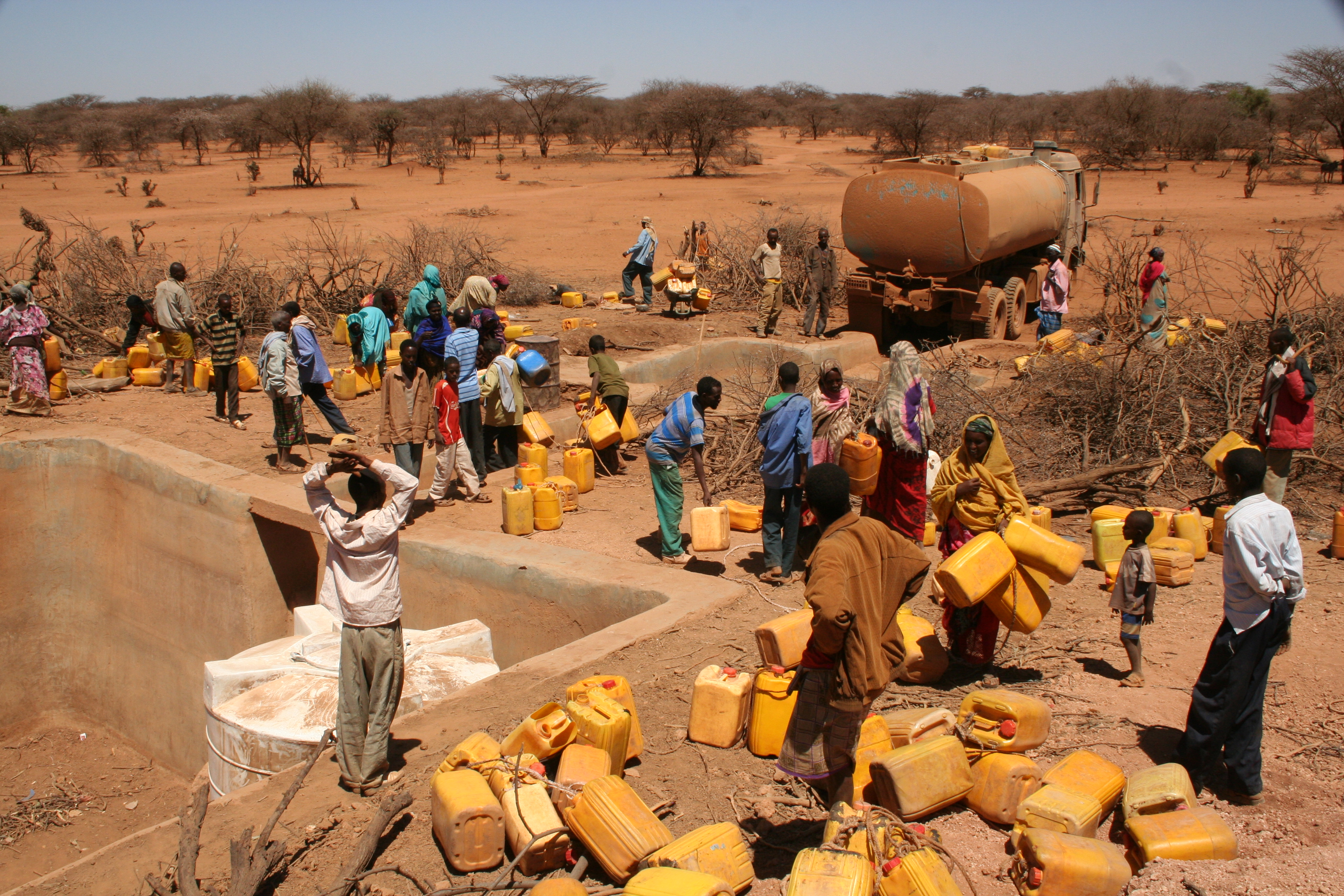
Water shortage in Ethiopia.

Water quality and availability have deteriorated in most areas of Africa, particularly due to climate change. Water resources are vulnerable and have the possibility of being strongly impacted by climate change with vast ramifications on human societies. The IPCC predicts millions of people in Africa will persistently face increased water stress due to climate variability and change (IPCC 2013). Changes in precipitation patterns directly affect surface runoff and water availability.

Climate change is likely to further exacerbate water-stressed catchments across Africa – for example the Rufiji basin in Tanzania – owing to diversity of land uses, and complex sociopolitical challenges.

=== Health impacts ===
African countries have the least efficient public health systems in the world. Infectious disease burdens such as malaria, schistosomiasis, dengue fever, meningitis, which are sensitive to climate impacts, are highest in the sub-Saharan African region. For instance, over 90 percent of annual global malaria cases are in Africa. Changes in climate will affect the spread of infectious agents as well as alter people's disposition to these infections.

According to the IPCC's Sixth Assessment Report, climate change poses a significant threat to the health of tens of millions of Africans, as it exposes them to non-optimal temperatures, extreme weather, and an increased range and transmission rate of infectious diseases.

Climate change, and resulting in increased temperatures, storms, droughts, and rising sea levels, will affect the incidence and distribution of infectious disease across the globe.

In July 2021, the World Food Programme (WFP) blamed the ongoing southern Madagascar food crisis as being caused solely by climate change and not by war or conflict. It was declared to be first famine caused by climate change.

==== Malaria ====
In Africa malaria continues to have dramatic effects on the population. As climate change continues, the specific areas likely to experience the year-round, high-risk transmission of malaria will shift from coastal West Africa to an area between the Democratic Republic of the Congo and Uganda, known as the African Highlands.

Scientific limitations when examining shifting malaria transmission rates in the African Highlands are similar to those related to broader understandings of climate change and malaria. While modeling with temperature changes shows that there is a relationship between an increase in temperature and an increase in malaria transmission, limitations still exist. Future population shifts that affect population density, as well as changes in the behavior of mosquitos, can affect transmission rates and are limiting factors in determining the future risk of malaria outbreaks, which also affect planning for correct outbreak response preparation.

With regards to malaria transmission rates in the African Highlands, factors and exposures resulting from drastic environmental changes like warmer climates, shifts in weather patterns, and increases in human impact such as deforestation, provide appropriate conditions for malaria transmission between carrier and host. Specifically, malaria is caused by the Plasmodium falciparum and Plasmodium vivax parasites which are carried by the vector Anopheles mosquito. Even though the Plasmodium vivax parasite can survive in lower temperatures, the Plasmodium falciparum parasite will only survive and replicate in the mosquito when climate temperatures are above 20 °C. Increases in humidity and rain also contribute to the replication and survival of this infectious agent. Exposure to malaria will become a greater risk to humans as the number of female Anopheles mosquitos infected with either the Plasmodium falciparum or Plasmodium vivax parasite increases.

Studies show an overall increase in climate suitability for malaria transmission resulting in an increase in the population at risk of contracting the disease. Of significant importance is the increase of epidemic potential at higher altitudes (like the African Highlands). Rising temperatures in these areas have the potential to change normally non-malarial areas to areas with seasonal epidemics. Consequently, new populations will be exposed to the disease resulting in healthy years lost. In addition, the disease burden may be more detrimental to areas that lack the ability and resources to effectively respond to such challenges and stresses.

As climate change shifts geographic areas of transmission to the African Highlands, the challenge will be to find and control the vector in areas that have not seen it before.

=== Impacts on conflicts and migration ===
The United Nations Environment Programme produced a post-conflict environmental assessment of Sudan in 2007. According to this report, environmental stresses in Sudan are interlinked with other social, economic and political issues, such as population displacement and competition over natural resources. Regional climate change, through decreased precipitation, was thought to have been one of the factors which contributed to the conflict in Darfur. Along with other environmental issues, climate change could negatively affect future development in Sudan. One of the recommendations made by UNEP was for the international community to assist Sudan in adapting to climate change.

== Impacts by region ==
=== Central Africa ===
Central Africa, for the most part, is landlocked and is geographically threatened by climate change. Due to its high climate variability and rainfed agriculture, Central Africa is expected to experience longer and more frequent heatwaves as well as an increase in wet extremes. The global mean temperature in this region is to increase by 1.5 °C to 2 °C.

The carbon dioxide-absorbing capacity of forests in the Congo Basin have decreased. This decrease has occurred due to increasing heat and drought causing decreased tree growth. This suggests that even unlogged forests are being affected by climate change. A Nature study indicates that by 2030, the African jungle will absorb 14 percent less carbon dioxide than it did from around 2005–2010, and will absorb none at all by 2035.

=== Eastern Africa ===
Situated almost entirely in the tropics, rainfall in Eastern Africa is dominated by the seasonal migration of the tropical-rain band. Eastern Africa is characterized by high spatio-temporal rainfall variability as it spans over 30 degrees of latitude (across the equator). It has influences from both the Indian and Atlantic Oceans, and has major geographic features (highlands) as well as inland water bodies such as Lake Victoria. Therefore, the rainfall seasonality varies from a single wet season per year in July–August in parts of the northwest (including Ethiopia and South Sudan, which are meteorologically more connected to West Africa, with the West African monsoon bringing the rains) to a single wet season per year in December – February in the south (over Tanzania), with many areas close to the equator having two rainy seasons per year, approximately in March–May (the "Long Rains") and October to December (the "Short Rains"). Fine-scale variability in rainfall seasonality is often linked to orography and lakes. Inter-annual variability can be large and known controls include variations in Sea surface temperatures (SSTs) of different ocean basins, large-scale atmospheric modes of variability such as the Madden–Julian Osciliation (MJO) and tropical cyclones. The Long Rains are the main crop-growing season in the region. Interannual predictability of this season is low compared to the Short Rains, and recent drying contrasts with climate projections of a wetter future (the "East African climate paradox".).

Eastern Africa has witnessed frequent and severe droughts in recent decades, as well as devastating floods. Trends in rainfall since the 1980s show a general decrease in March – May (MAM) seasonal rains with a slight increase during June – September (JJAS) and October – December (OND) rains, although there appears to have been a recent recovery in the MAM rains. In the future, both rainfall and temperature are projected to change over Eastern Africa. Recent studies on climate projections suggest that average temperature might increase by about 2–3 °C by the middle of the century and 2–5 °C at the end of the century. This will depend on emission scenarios as well as on how the real climate responds compared with the range of possible outcomes shown by models. Climate model projections tend to show an increase in rainfall, particularly during OND season, which is also projected to occur later. This delay in the short rain season, has been linked to the deepening of the Saharan Heat Low under climate change. However, some models predict decreasing rainfall, and for some regions and seasons the very largest rainfall increases predicted have been shown to involve implausible mechanisms due to systematic model errors. In addition, changes of aerosols provide a forcing of rainfall change that is not captured in many assessments of climate projections.

The contrast of the drying trend of MAM (long rains) rainfall in equatorial Eastern Africa, with most models predicting a wetting in the future has been labelled the "East African climate change paradox", although there has been some recent recovery in the rainfall. Studies have shown that the drying trend is unlikely to be purely natural, but may be driven by factors such as aerosols rather than greenhouse gases, further research is needed. The drying has been shown to have been caused by a shorter rainy season, and linked to deepening of the Arabian Heat Low.

Consistent with the uncertainty in rainfall projections, changes in rainy seasons onset are uncertain in equatorial Eastern Africa, although many models predict a later and wetter short rains. The Indian Ocean Dipole (IOD) is known to provide a strong control on inter-annual variability in the short rains, and studies show that extreme IODs may increase under climate change.

Globally, climate change is expected to lead to intensification of rainfall, as extreme rainfall increases at a faster rate with warming than total rainfall does. Recent work shows that across Africa global models are expected to under-estimate the rate of change of this rainfall intensification, and changes in rainfall extremes may be much more widespread than those predicted by global models.

Southern parts of Eastern Africa receive most of their rainfall in a single rainy season during the southern hemisphere's winter: over Tanzania seasonal rainfall is projected to increase under future climate change, although there is uncertainty. Further south, over Mozambique, a shorter season due to a later onset is projected under future climate change, again with some uncertainty.

As an example, Kenya has a high vulnerability to the impacts of climate change. The main climate hazards include droughts and floods as rainfall will likely become more intense and less predictable. Climate models predict that temperatures will rise by 0.5 to 2 °C. In the informal urban settlements of Nairobi the urban heat island effect adds to the problem as it creates even warmer ambient temperatures. This is due to home construction materials, lack of ventilation, sparse green space, and poor access to electrical power and other services.

=== North Africa ===
Climate classification maps for the Middle East at present (top) and predicted for North Africa for 2071–2100 under the most intense climate change scenario (bottom). Mid-range scenarios are currently considered more likely.

In 2018, the MENA region emitted 3.2 billion tonnes of carbon dioxide and produced 8.7% of global greenhouse gas emissions (GHG). These emissions are mostly from the energy sector, an integral component of many Middle Eastern and North African economies due to the extensive oil and natural gas reserves that are found within the region. The Middle East region is one of the most vulnerable to climate change. The impacts include an increase in drought conditions, aridity, heatwaves and sea level rise.

Sharp global temperature and sea level changes, shifting precipitation patterns and increased frequency of extreme weather events are some of the main impacts of climate change as identified by the Intergovernmental Panel on Climate Change (IPCC). The MENA region is especially vulnerable to such impacts due to its arid and semi-arid environment, facing climatic challenges such as low rainfall, high temperatures and dry soil. The climatic conditions that foster such challenges for MENA are projected by the IPCC to worsen throughout the 21st century. If greenhouse gas emissions are not significantly reduced, part of the MENA region risks becoming uninhabitable before the year 2100.

=== West Africa and the Sahel ===
The West African region can be divided into four climatic sub-regions namely the Guinea Coast, Soudano-Sahel, Sahel (extending eastward to the Ethiopian border) and the Sahara, each with different climatic conditions. The seasonal cycle of rainfall is mainly driven by the south–north movement of the Inter-Tropical Convergence Zone (ITCZ) which is characterised by the confluence between moist southwesterly monsoon winds and the dry northeasterly Harmattan.

Based on the inter-annual rainfall variability, three main climatic periods have been observed over the Sahel: the wet period from 1950 to the early 1960s followed by a dry period from 1972 to 1990 and then the period from 1991 onwards which has seen a partial rainfall recovery. During the dry period, the Sahel experienced a number of particularly severe drought events, with devastating effects. The recent decades, have also witnessed a moderate increment in annual rainfall since the beginning of 1990s. However, total annual rainfall remains significantly below that observed during the 1950s.

Some have identified the two recent decades as a recovery period. Others refer to this as a period of "hydrological intensification" with much of the annual rainfall increase coming from more severe rain events and sometimes flooding rather than more frequent rainfall, or similarly other works underline the continuity of the drought even though the rainfall has increased. Since 1985, 54 percent of the population has been affected by five or more floods in the 17 Sahel region countries. In 2012, severe drought conditions in the Sahel were reported. Governments in the region responded quickly, launching strategies to address the issue.

The region is projected to experience changes in rainfall regime, with climate models suggesting that decreases in wet season rainfall are more likely in the western Sahel, and increases more likely in the central to east Sahel, although opposite trends cannot yet be ruled out. These trends will affect the frequency and severity of floods, droughts, desertification, sand and dust storms, desert locust plagues and water shortages.

However, irrespective of the changes in seasonal mean rain, the most intense storms are expected to become more intense, amplifying flood frequency. Enhanced carbon emissions and global warming may also lead to an increase in dry spells especially across the Guinea Coast associated with a reduction of the wet spells under both 1.5 °C and 2 °C global warming level.

Fifteen percent of the population of the Sahel region has also experienced a temperature increase of more than 1 °C from 1970 to 2010. The Sahel region, in particular, will experience higher average temperatures over the course of the 21st century and changes in rainfall patterns, according to the Intergovernmental Panel on Climate Change (IPCC).

== Adaptation ==
To reduce the impacts of climate change on African countries, adaptation measures are required at multiple scales – ranging from local to national and regional levels. The first generation of adaptation projects in Africa can be largely characterized as small-scale in nature, focused on targeted investments in agriculture and diffusion of technologies to support adaptive decision-making. More recently, programming efforts have re-oriented towards larger and more coordinated efforts, tackling issues that spanning multiple sectors. According to a 2023 study, 59% of African banks have a climate change policy in place, with another 22% planning to implement one. 65% of banks presently consider climate risk when evaluating new clients or projects, with another 23% expecting to do so in the future.

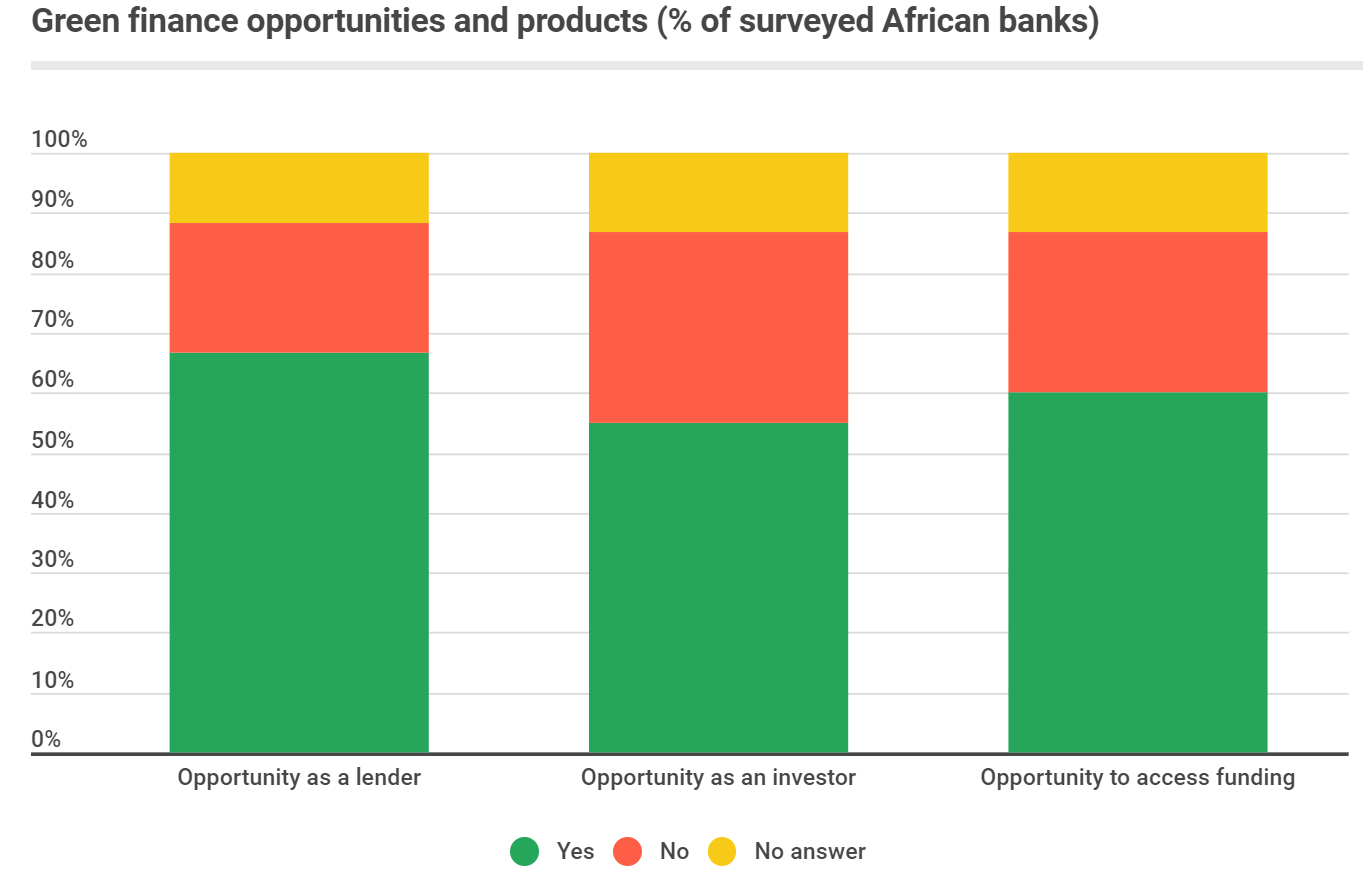
Green finance opportunities and products from surveyed banks in the European Investment Bank's Banking in Africa survey

Improved weather forecasting technology in sub-Saharan Africa is important to inform the response to climate change, to aid decision-making associated with adaptation to climate change for example.

During the 21st Conference of the Parties (COP) in 2015, African heads of state launched the Africa Adaptation Initiative (AAI). The AAI's steering committee is composed of the African Ministerial Conference on Environment (AMCEN) Bureau and the chair of the African Group of Negotiators (AGN).

The Africa Adaptation Initiative is also supported by the European Union. The European Union has partnered with the African Union on the promotion of sustainable resources management, environmental resilience, and climate change mitigation

At the regional level, policies and actions in support of adaptation across Africa are still in their infancy. The IPCC's Fifth Assessment Report (AR5) highlights examples of various regional climate change action plans, including those developed by the Southern African Development Community (SADC) and Lake Victoria Basin Committee. At the national level, many early adaptation initiatives were coordinated through National Adaptation Programmes of Action (NAPAs) or National Climate Change Response Strategies (NCCRS). Implementation has been slow however, with mixed success in delivery. Integration of climate change with wider economic and development planning remains limited but growing.

At the subnational level, many provincial and municipal authorities are also developing their own strategies, for example the Western Cape Climate Change Response Strategy. Yet, levels of technical capacity and resources available to implement plans are generally low. There has been considerable attention across Africa given to implementing community-based adaptation projects. There is broad agreement that support to local-level adaptation is best achieved by starting with existing local adaptive capacity, and engaging with indigenous knowledge and practices.

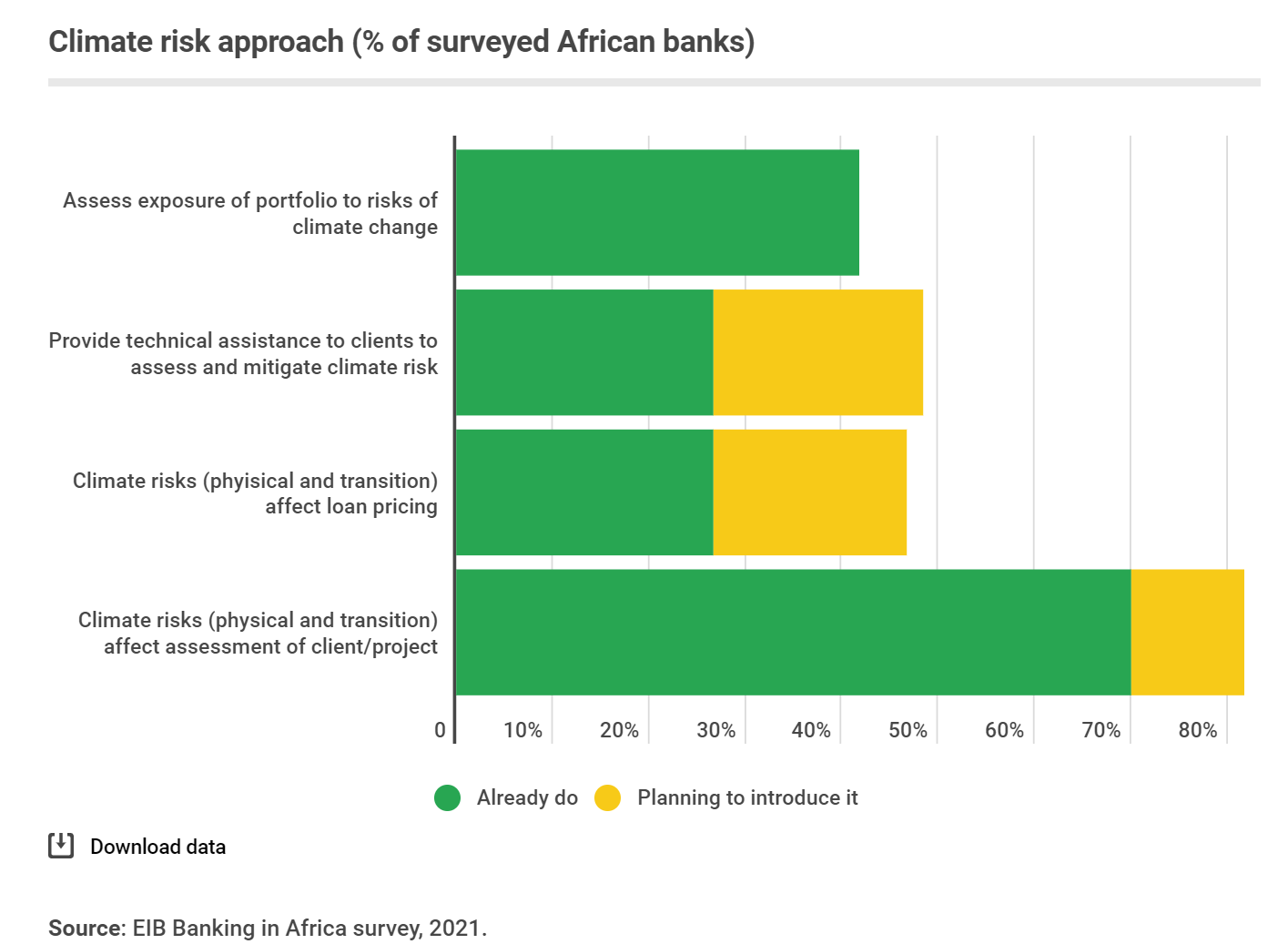
Results regarding African banks' climate risk approach (% of surveyed banks) from the European Investment Bank's Banking in Africa survey 2021

The IPCC highlights a number of successful approaches to promote effective adaptation in Africa, outlining five common principles. These include:

1. Enhancing support for autonomous forms of adaptation;
2. Increasing attention to the cultural, ethical, and rights considerations of adaptation (especially through active participation of women, youth, and poor and vulnerable people in adaptation activities);
3. Combining "soft path" options and flexible and iterative learning approaches with technological and infrastructural approaches (including integration of scientific, local, and indigenous knowledge in developing adaptation strategies)
4. Focusing on enhancing resilience and implementing low-regrets adaptation options; and
5. Building adaptive management and encouraging process of social and institutional learning into adaptation activities.

The World Health Organization's report "Adaptation to Climate Change in Africa Plan of Action for the Health Sector 2012–2016" is intended to "provide a comprehensive and evidence-based coordinated response of the health sector to climate change adaptation needs of African countries in order to support the commitments and priorities of African governments." The action plan includes goals like scaling up public health activities, coordinating efforts on an international scale, strengthening partnerships and collaborative efforts, and promoting research on both the effects of climate change as well as effective measures taken in local communities to mitigate climate change consequences.

According to the International Monetary Fund (IMF), Sub-Saharan Africa requires $30–$50 billion in additional financing each year to adapt to the effects of climate change.

Climate financing in the Middle East and North Africa totaled $32.6 billion (2% of the world total) in 2019/2020, while climate investment in Sub-Saharan Africa was $43.8 billion (3% of the global total).

According to the European Investment Bank's Banking in Africa study 2021, African institutions are becoming more conscious of the need to address the dangers posed by climate change and are beginning to capitalize on possibilities in green financing. For example, 54% of questioned banks in the study saw climate change as a strategic concern, and more than 40% had people focusing on climate-related fronts. Sub-Saharan African banks are growing their digital offerings, which has been expedited by the COVID-19 pandemic. The majority of the banks surveyed said that the pandemic has accelerated the speed of digital transformation, and that this shift will be permanent.

The poor and vulnerable are most susceptible, with migrant workers, refugees, and other marginalised groups likely to suffer the most. GDP per capita is not likely to rebound to 2019 levels until 2024, with risks tilting to the downside, and the crisis has reversed a predicted drop in the number of poor people, according to the IMF.

In comparison to pre-crisis forecasts, this might result in an additional 30 million people in Sub-Saharan Africa living in extreme poverty by 2021, as well as an additional nine million in the Middle East and North Africa (MENA) area.

As of 2023, about a third of all African climate funding flows to five major markets: Morocco (7% of African climate investment in 2019/2022), Nigeria (7%), Kenya (7%), Ethiopia (6%), and South Africa (5%).

Over the last decade, worldwide greenfield foreign direct investment has declined at a 3% annual rate, with Africa's global contribution dropping from 12% in 2017 to less than 6% in 2021.

=== Northern Africa adaptation measures ===
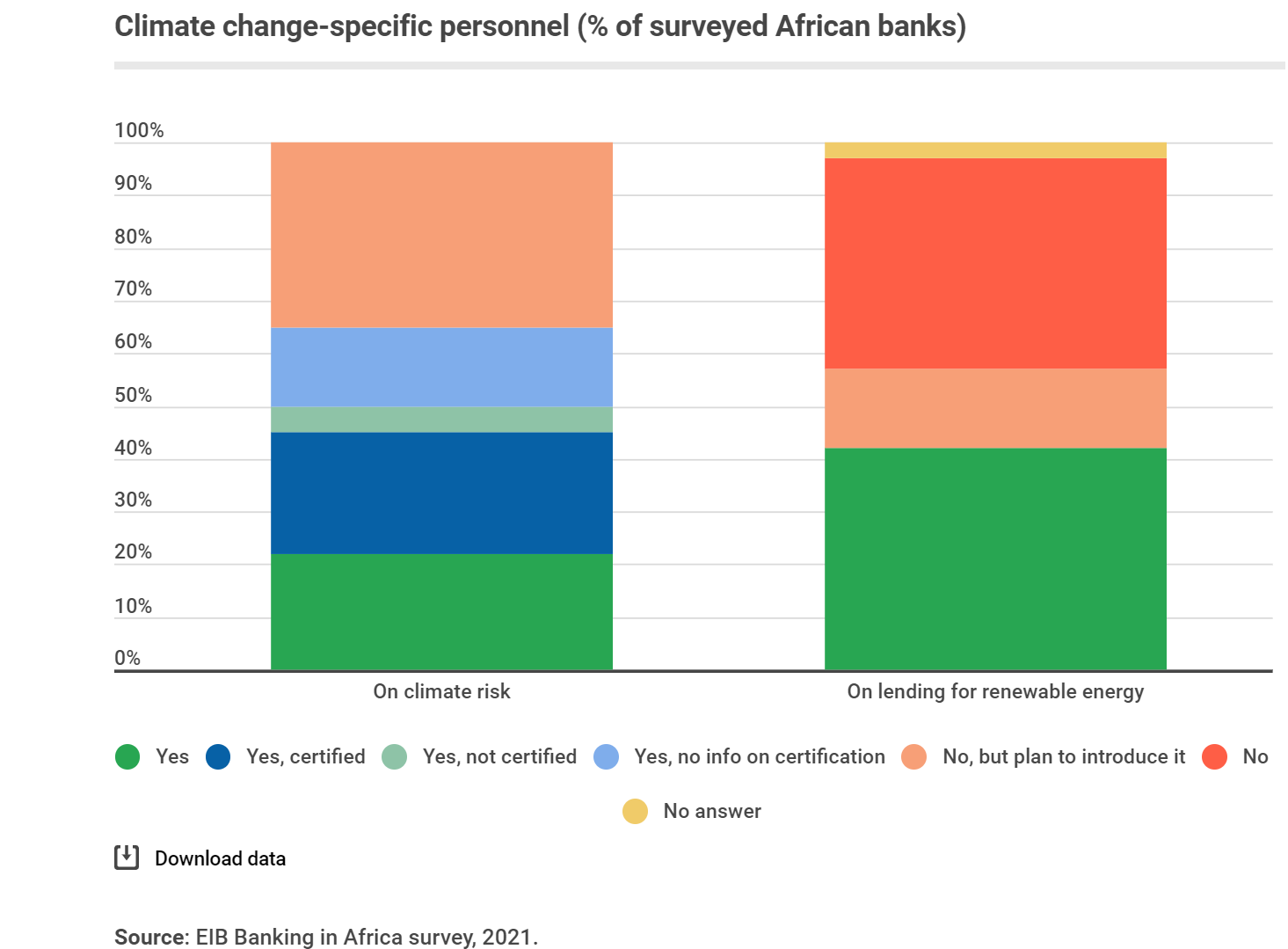
Climate change specific personnel in surveyed African banks in the European Investment Bank Banking in Africa survey (% of surveyed African banks)

Key adaptations in northern Africa relate to increased risk of water scarcity (resulting from a combination of climate change affecting water availability and increasing demand). Reduced water availability, in turn, interacts with increasing temperatures to create need for adaptation among rainfed wheat production and changing disease risk (for example from leishmaniasis). Most government actions for adaptation centre on water supply side, for example through desalination, inter-basin transfers and dam construction. Migration has also been observed to act as an adaptation for individuals and households in northern Africa. Like many regions, however, examples of adaptation action (as opposed to intentions to act, or vulnerability assessments) from north Africa are limited – a systematic review published in 2011 showed that only 1 out of 87 examples of reported adaptations came from North Africa.

=== Western Africa adaptation measures ===
Water availability is a particular risk in Western Africa, with extreme events such as drought leading to humanitarian crises associated with periodic famines, food insecurity, population displacement, migration and conflict and insecurity. Adaptation strategies can be environmental, cultural/agronomic and economic.

Adaptation strategies are evident in the agriculture sector, some of which are developed or promoted by formal research or experimental stations. Indigenous agricultural adaptations observed in northern Ghana are crop-related, soil-related or involve cultural practices. Livestock-based agricultural adaptations include indigenous strategies such as adjusting quantities of feed to feed livestock, storing enough feed during the abundant period to be fed to livestock during the lean season, treating wounds with solution of certain barks of trees, and keeping local breeds which are already adapted to the climate of northern Ghana; and livestock production technologies to include breeding, health, feed/nutrition and housing.

The choice and adoption of adaptation strategies is variously contingent on demographic factors such as the household size, age, gender and education of the household head; economic factors such as income source; farm size; knowledge of adaptation options; and expectation of future prospects.

=== Eastern Africa adaptation measures ===
In Eastern Africa adaptation options are varied, including improving use of climate information, actions in the agriculture and livestock sector, and in the water sector.

Making better use of climate and weather data, weather forecasts, and other management tools enables timely information and preparedness of people in the sectors such as agriculture that depend on weather outcomes. This means mastering hydro-meteorological information and early warning systems. It has been argued that the indigenous communities possess knowledge on historical climate changes through environmental signs (e.g. appearance and migration of certain birds, butterflies etc.), and thus promoting of indigenous knowledge has been considered an important adaptation strategy.

Adaptation in the agricultural sector includes increased use of manure and crop-specific fertilizer, use of resistant varieties of crops and early maturing crops. Manure, and especially animal manure is thought to retain water and have essential microbes that breakdown nutrients making them available to plants, as compared to synthetic fertilizers that have compounds which when released to the environment due to over-use release greenhouse gases. One major vulnerability of the agriculture sector in Eastern Africa is the dependence on rain-fed agriculture. An adaptation solution is efficient irrigation mechanisms and efficient water storage and use. Drip irrigation has especially been identified as a water-efficient option as it directs the water to the root of the plant with minimal wastage. Countries like Rwanda and Kenya have prioritized developing irrigated areas by gravity water systems from perennial streams and rivers in zones vulnerable to prolonged droughts. During heavy rains, many areas experience flooding resulting from bare grounds due to deforestation and little land cover. Adaptation strategies proposed for this is promoting conservation efforts on land protection, by planting indigenous trees, protecting water catchment areas and managing grazing lands through zoning.

For the livestock sector, adaptation options include managing production through sustainable land and pasture management in the ecosystems. This includes promoting hay and fodder production methods e.g. through irrigation and use of waste treated water, and focusing on investing in hay storage for use during dry seasons. Keeping livestock is considered a livelihood rather than an economic activity. Throughout Eastern Africa Countries especially in the ASALs regions, it is argued that promoting commercialisation of livestock is an adaptation option. This involves adopting economic models in livestock feed production, animal traceability, promoting demand for livestock products such as meat, milk and leather and linking to niche markets to enhance businesses and provide disposable income.

In the water sector, options include efficient use of water for households, animals and industrial consumption and protection of water sources. Campaigns such as planting indigenous trees in water catchment areas, controlling human activities near catchment areas especially farming and settlement have been carried out to help protect water resources and avail access to water for communities especially during climatic shocks.

Comoros – "NAPA is the operational extension of the Poverty Reduction Strategy Paper (PRSP), as it includes among its adaptation priorities, agriculture, fishing, water, housing, health, but also tourism, in an indirect way, through the reconstitution of basin slopes and the fight against soils erosion, and therefore the protection of reefs by limiting the silting up by terrigenous contributions."

Kenya gazetted the Climate Change Act, 2016 which establishes an authority to oversee development, management, implementation and regulation of mechanisms to enhance climate change resilience and low carbon development for sustainable development, by the National and County Governments, the private sector, civil society, and other actors. Kenya has also developed the National Climate Change Action Plan (NCCAP 2018–2022 ) which aims to further the country's development goals by providing mechanisms and measures to achieve low carbon climate-resilient development in a manner that prioritizes adaptation.

=== Central Africa adaptation measures ===
Angola – "The objective of the National Adaptation Programs of Action are to identify and communicate the urgent and immediate needs of the country regarding climate change adaptation, to increase Angola's resilience to climate variabilities and to climate change to ensure achievement of Poverty reduction programs, sustainable development objectives and the Millennium Development Goals pursued by the Government."

=== Southern Africa adaptation measures ===
There have been several initiatives at local (site-specific), local, national and regional scales aimed at strengthening to climate change. Some of these are: The Regional Climate Change Programme (RCCP), SASSCAL, ASSAR, UNDP Climate Change Adaptation, RESILIM, FRACTAL. South Africa implemented the Long-Term adaptation Scenarios Flagship Research Programme (LTAS) from April 2012 to June 2014. This research also produced factsheets and a technical report covering the SADC region entitled "Climate Change Adaptation: Perspectives for the Southern African Development Community (SADC)".

Madagascar – the priority sectors for adaptation are: agriculture and livestock, forestry, public health, water resources and coastal zones.

Malawi – The NAPA identifies the following as high priority activities for adaptation: "Improving community resilience to climate change through the development of sustainable rural livelihoods, Restoring forests in the Upper and Lower Shire Valleys catchments to reduce siltation and associated water flow problems, Improving agricultural production under erratic rains and changing climatic conditions, Improving Malawi's preparedness to cope with droughts and floods, and Improving climate monitoring to enhance Malawi's early warning capability and decision making and sustainable utilisation of Lake Malawi and lakeshore areas resources". And according to the World Bank's Country Climate and Development Report (CCDR) for Malawi, can "take steps to jumpstart investments in climate-resilient infrastructure and halt land degradation and forest loss to improve agriculture productivity and carbon capture" "

Mauritius – adaptation should address the following priority areas: coastal resources, agriculture, water resources, fisheries, health and well-being, land use change and forestry and biodiversity.

Mozambique – "The proposed adaptation initiatives target various areas of economic and social development, and outline projects related to the reduction of impacts to natural disasters, the creation of adaptation measures to climate change, fight against soil erosion in areas of high desertification and coastal zones, reforestation and the management of water resources.""

Rwanda has developed the National Adaptation Programme of Action (NAPA 2006) which contains information to guide national policy-makers and planners on priority vulnerabilities and adaptations in important economic sectors. The country has also developed sector based policies on adaptation to climate change such as the Vision 2020, the National Environmental Policy and the Agricultural Policy among others.

Tanzania – Tanzania has outlined priority adaptation measures in their NAPA, and various national sector strategies and research outputs. The NAPA has been successful at encouraging climate change mainstreaming into sector policies in Tanzania; however, the cross-sectoral collaboration crucial to implementing adaptation strategies remains limited due to institutional challenges such as power imbalances, budget constraints and an ingrained sectoral approach. Most of the projects in Tanzania concern agriculture and water resource management (irrigation, water saving, rainwater collection); however, energy and tourism also play an important role.

Zambia – "The NAPA identifies 39 urgent adaptation needs and 10 priority areas within the sectors of agriculture and food security (livestock, fisheries and crops), energy and water, human health, natural resources and wildlife."

Zimbabwe – "The other strategic interventions by the NAP process will be: Strengthening the role of private sector in adaptation planning, Enhancing of the capacity of Government to develop bankable projects through trainings, Improving management of background climate information to inform climate change planning, Crafting a proactive resource-mobilization strategy for identifying and applying for international climate finance as requests for funds are primarily reactive at present, focusing on emergency relief rather than climate change risk reduction, preparedness and adaptation, Developing a coordinated monitoring and evaluation policy for programs and projects, as many institutions within the government do not currently have a systematic approach to monitoring and evaluation."

Lesotho – "The key objectives of the NAPA process entail: identification of communities and livelihoods most vulnerable to climate change, generating a list of activities that would form a core of the national adaptation program of action, and to communicate the country's immediate and urgent needs and priorities for building capacity for adaptation to climate change.""

Namibia – the critical themes for adaptation are "Food security and sustainable biological resource base, Sustainable water resources base, Human health and well-being and Infrastructure development.

South Africa has adopted in August 2020 its National Climate Change Adaptation Strategy, which "acts as a common reference point for climate change adaptation efforts in South Africa, and it provides a platform upon which national climate change adaptation objectives for the country can be articulated so as to provide overarching guidance to all sectors of the economy"

== Society and culture ==
=== Inequality in climate research ===
Even though Africa is going to be one of the most affected continents from climate change, systematic inequity and other biases related to scientific research and funding mean that very little of the published science about climate change and climate research funding is for African scientist. An analysis of research money from 1990 to 2020 for climate change, found that 78% of research money for research on climate change in Africa was spent in European and North American institutions and more was spent for former British colonies than other countries. This pattern of parachute science, in turn both prevents local researchers from doing groundbreaking work, because they do not have the funding for experimental activities and reduces investment in local researchers ideas and in topics important to the Global South, such as climate change adaptation.

Accurate sustainability evaluations are challenging due to a lack of sustainable investment frameworks, as well as data and managerial capability restrictions. Currently, fewer than half of Africa's top pension funds report information on sustainability policies and execution.

The United Nations Conference on Trade and Development - International Standards of Accounting and Reporting (UNCTAD-ISAR) founded the African Regional Partnership for Sustainability and SDG Reporting in 2022. The collaboration has 53 members as of March 2023, including national corporate social responsibility networks and/or ministries from 27 African nations.

== See also ==
- Ecotourism in Africa
- Water scarcity in Africa
