= Culicoides bolitinos =

Scientific classification
- Kingdom: Animalia
- Phylum: Arthropoda
- Class: Insecta
- Order: Diptera
- Family: Ceratopogonidae
- Genus: Culicoides
- Subgenus: Avaritia
- Species: C. bolitinos

Binomial name
- Culicoides bolitinos Meiswinkel 1989

Species of fly

Culicoides bolitinos is an African species of bloodsucking fly that breeds in the dung of the African buffalo (Syncerus caffer), the blue wildebeest (Connochaetes taurinus), and cattle (Bosraces). It is considered a possible vector for African horse sickness. It is closely related to Culicoides imicola.
