= Island of Saint-Louis =

Historic part of Saint-Louis, Senegal

- Île de Saint-Louis (French)
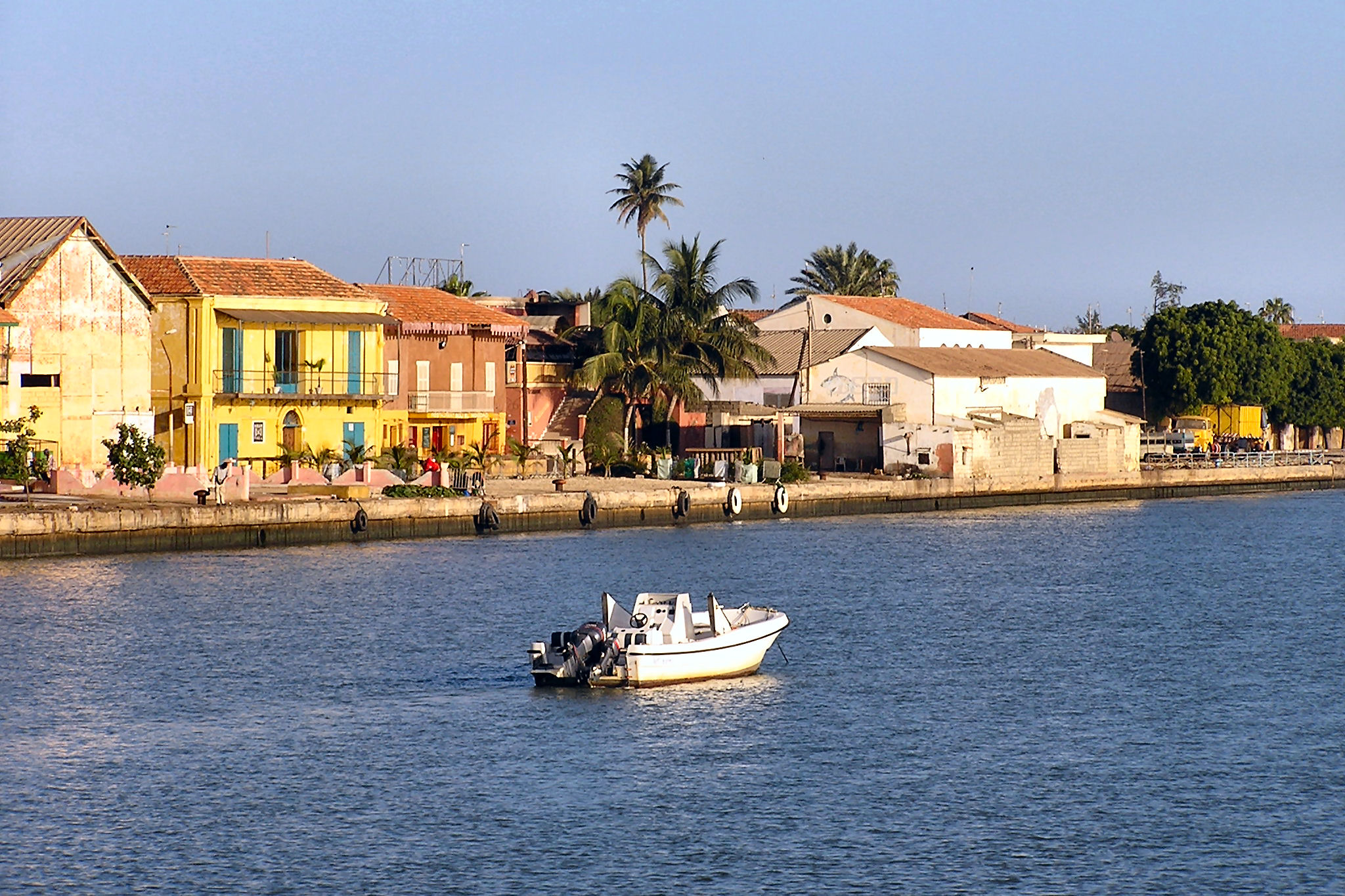
- Cityscape of Saint-Louis Island

- Location within Senegal Location within Africa
- 16°1′40.008″N 16°30′15.984″W
- Type: Settlement
- Location: Saint-Louis, Senegal

UNESCO World Heritage Site
- Official name: Island of Saint-Louis
- Type: Cultural
- Criteria: (ii)(iv)
- Designated: 2013
- Reference no.: 956bis
- Region: African States

The Island of Saint-Louis is the historic part of the city of Saint-Louis in Senegal. In 2000, it was inscribed by the UNESCO on the World Heritage list.

== History ==
Founded as a French colonial settlement in the 17th century, Saint-Louis was urbanised in the mid-19th century. It was the capital of Senegal from 1872 to 1957 and played an important cultural and economic role in the whole of West Africa. The location of the town on an island at the mouth of the Senegal River, its regular town plan, the system of quays, and the characteristic colonial architecture give Saint-Louis its distinctive appearance and identity.

== Climate change ==
In 2022, the IPCC Sixth Assessment Report included the Island of Saint-Louis in the list of African cultural sites which would be threatened by flooding and coastal erosion by the end of the century, but only if climate change followed RCP 8.5, which is the scenario of high and continually increasing greenhouse gas emissions associated with the warming of over 4 °C., and is no longer considered very likely. The other, more plausible scenarios result in lower warming levels and consequently lower sea level rise: yet, sea levels would continue to increase for about 10,000 years under all of them. Even if the warming is limited to 1.5 °C, global sea level rise is still expected to exceed 2–3 m (7–10 ft) after 2000 years (and higher warming levels will see larger increases by then), consequently exceeding 2100 levels of sea level rise under RCP 8.5 (~0.75 m (2 ft) with a range of 0.5–1 m (2–3 ft)) at some earlier point.

== Sources ==
This article incorporates text from a free content work. Licensed under CC BY-SA IGO 3.0 (license statement/permission). Text taken from Historic Centre of Agadez, UNESCO World Heritage Centre.
