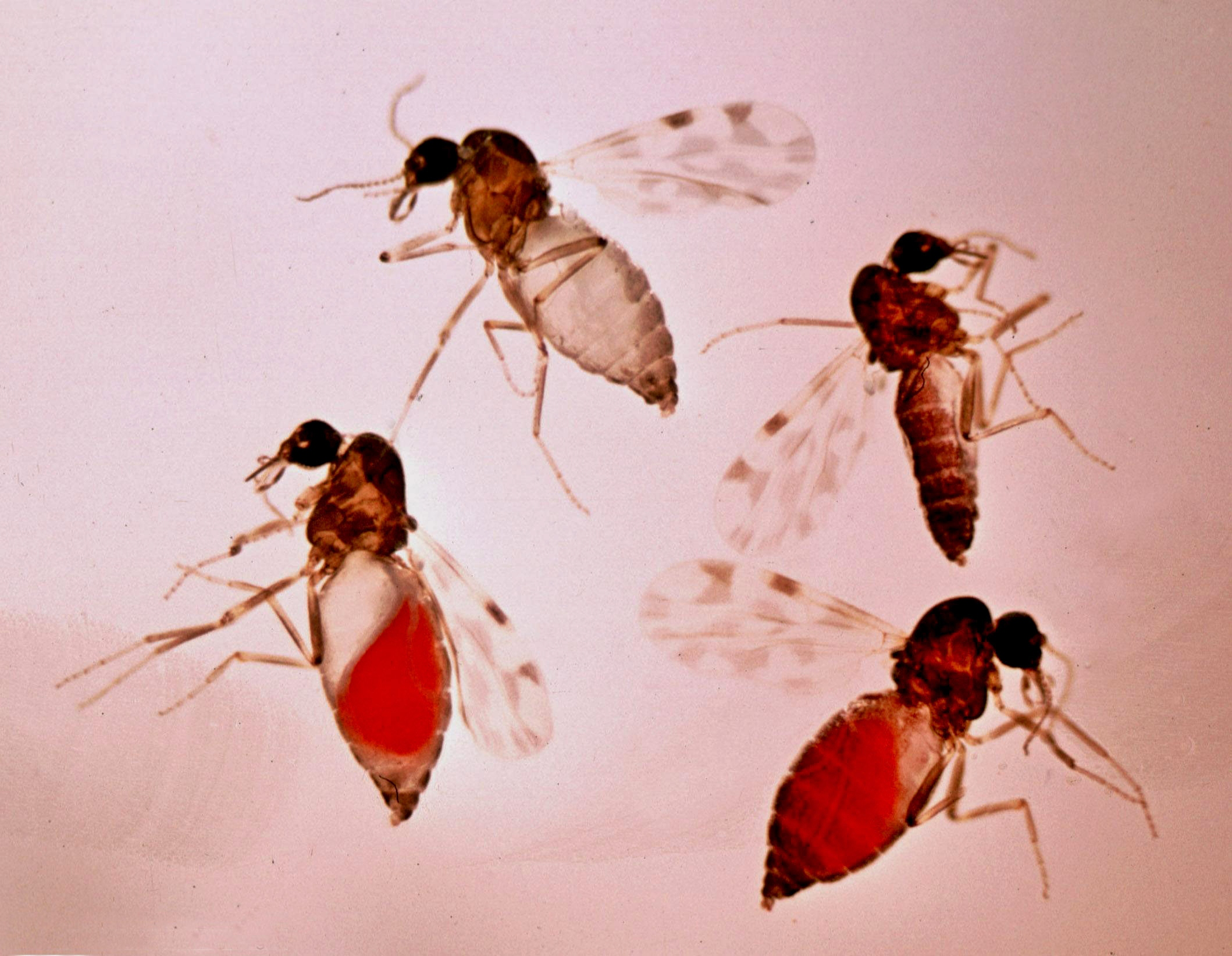

Scientific classification
- Kingdom: Animalia
- Phylum: Arthropoda
- Clade: Pancrustacea
- Class: Insecta
- Order: Diptera
- Family: Ceratopogonidae
- Genus: Culicoides
- Subgenus: Avaritia
- Species: C. imicola

Binomial name
- Culicoides imicola Kieffer, 1913

Synonyms
- Ceratopogon pallidipennis Carter, Ingram & Macfie, 1920; C. iraquensis Khalaf, 1957; C. pallidipennis Carter, Ingram & Macfie, 1920

= Culicoides imicola =

Species of fly

Culicoides imicola (Culicoides imicola Kieffer, former name C. pallidipennis Carter) is a species of Ceratopogonidae that transmits the bluetongue virus (BTV) and the African horse sickness virus. This particular species has been recorded in Africa, Asia and Europe. African midges feed on animal blood, including horse, cattle, and sheep. Unlike other species within the Culicoides genus, this species prefers drier habitats for egg laying but retains a preference for moist soil to support larvae growth. Other suspected BTV vectors are Culicoides (Culicoides) pulicaris and species in the Culicoides (Avaritia) obsoletus complex.

== Description ==
There are many species in the family, and it is difficult to physically distinguish between them. This has historically been a source of confusion in studies involving C. imicola.

=== Male ===
Males are characterized by spicules on their genitalia, which has a normal average of 45 spicules. However, variation is significant, as their quantity has been recorded to range from 8 to 145 spicules. Spicules are needle-like projections from the genitalia.

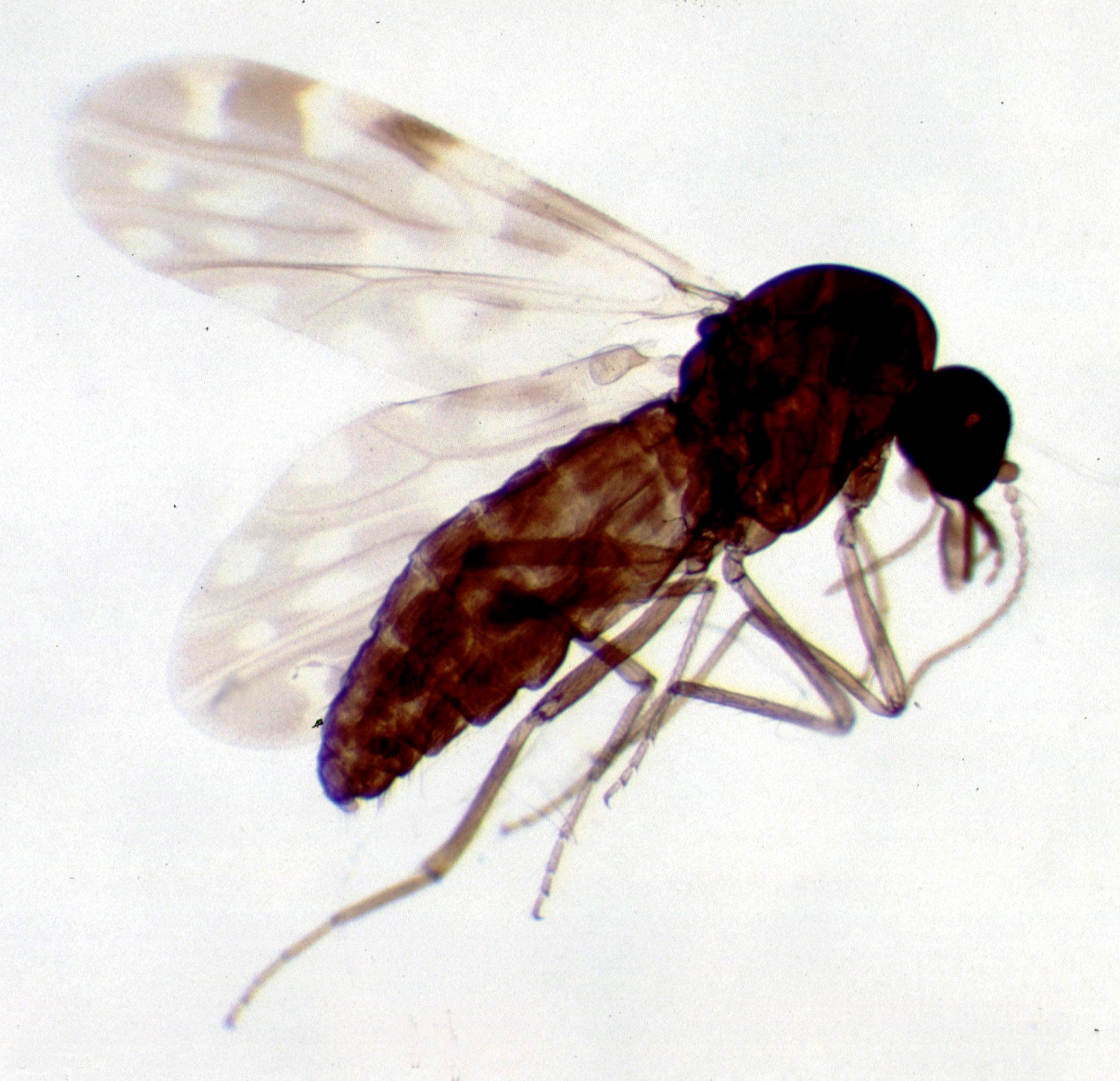
Culicoides cornutus, a close relative of C. imicola

== Distribution ==
Historically, Culicoides imicola has been found in Africa and southwestern Asia, but their distribution has been increasing, as human activity has catalyzed this spread. Because of the connection between cattle and C. imicola, C.imicola can be found where cattle are densely populated. Coupled with irrigation in farms which provides damper more habitable soil, C.imicola population has been able to rise.

== Habitat ==
Unlike other species of Culicoides, C. imicola has been shown to prefer drier environments in multiple studies. A likely reason is that C. imicola pupa are especially prone to drowning, so their eggs are often laid in surfaces free of running water. However, the larvae need moist soil, so there tends to be a trade-off between dry and wet areas.

=== Altitude and terrain ===
In a study done in Sicily, C. imicola do not inhabit undulating or high-altitude areas. They instead prefer lower altitude flattish regions at around 200 meters. This is because in steeply undulating topographic areas, rapid desiccation leads to drying of soil, which prevents proper larval development. Further examination has shown that the biggest determining factor in their distribution is not altitude but a suitable climate and nutritious soil.

== Taxonomy ==
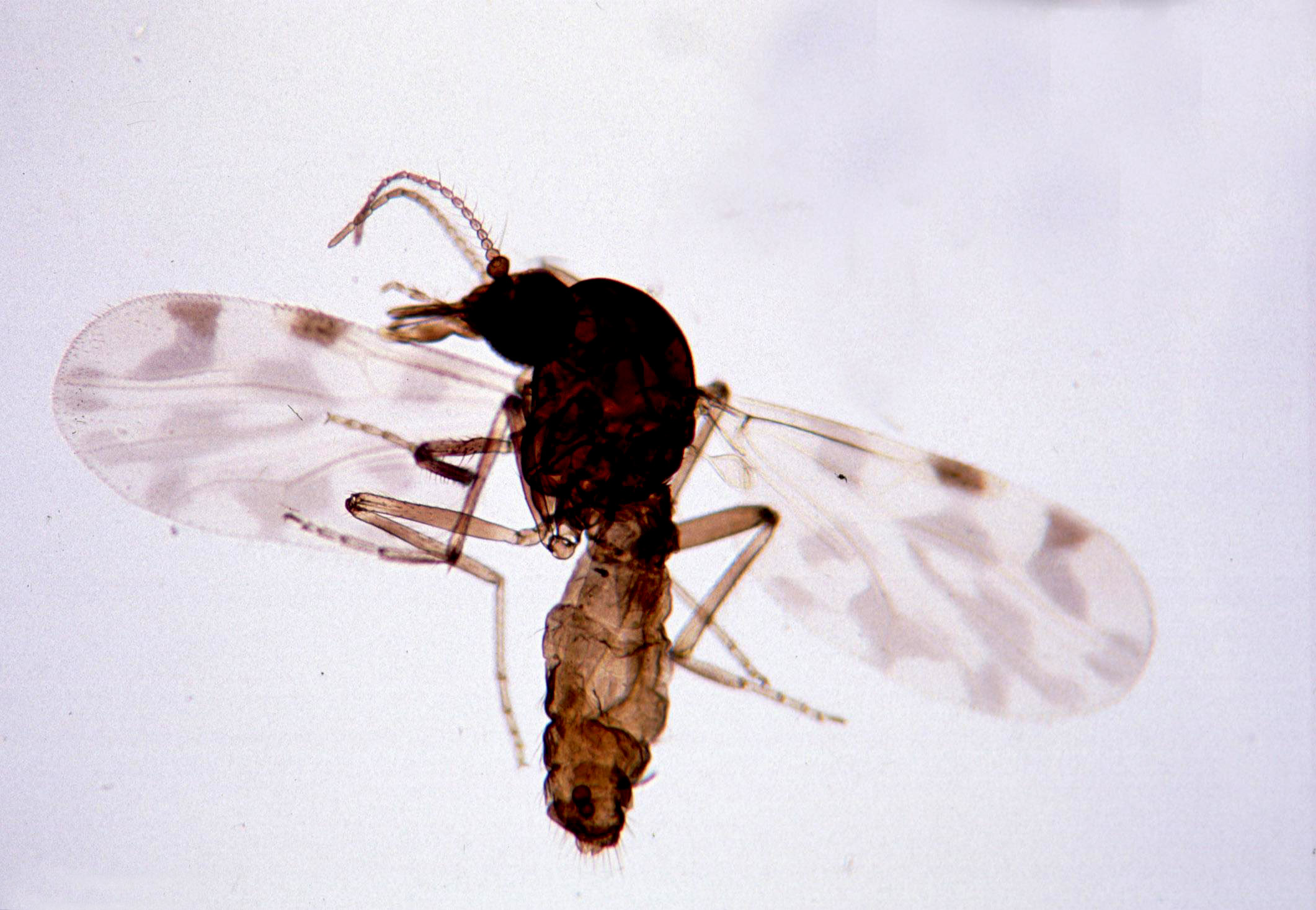
Culicoides imicola

Culicoides bolitinos, once thought to be the same species as C. imicola, has now been recognized as a separate but closely related species.

Some important taxonomic differences are: different margins in cell R5, different color and size of apex of vein M2, and different palp lengths, along with other sexual differences.

== Life history ==
There are four main stages of development: egg, larvae, pupa, and imago. Eggs are laid in batches and darken quickly once laid.

The life cycle of C. imicola depends largely on the temperature at which pregnant females lay their eggs. In laboratory-tested flies, it was found that at 20 °C it takes up to 2 months to go from egg-laying to adulthood, up to 21 days at 25 °C, and up to 16 days at 28 °C. However, at higher temperatures there were fewer hatchings and higher variability in fecundity. It is also interesting to note that more males emerge from pupae than females, although the exact reasons are unknown. Some possible explanations are that the female larvae have higher mortality rates, or that the sex ratio is temperature dependent.

== Food resources ==
Culicoides imicola, like most other biting midges, feed on animal blood. In Africa, C. imicola is known to feed on horse, cattle, and sheep. Nonetheless, their feeding preferences haven't been studied extensively in Europe but should be similar to those in Africa.

== Activity ==
Culicoides species vary significantly in their activities in different contexts. In a study done in Kenya, Culicoides imicola effectively ceases all activity at wind speeds above three meters per second. And, like most Culicoides, Culicoides imicola is also known to be nocturnal and tend to be more active during cooler temperatures.

== Interaction with humans ==
Culicoides imicola and humans usually do not interact directly, but they do so through their capabilities as disease vectors for many farm animals such as cows, horses, and sheep. Cattle drives have thus been identified as a man-made mechanism for the spread of infectious disease vectors, such as C. imicola. These vectors rely on cattle dung, and their introduction into different areas has led to C. imicola and viral spread across the world.

== Bluetongue virus ==
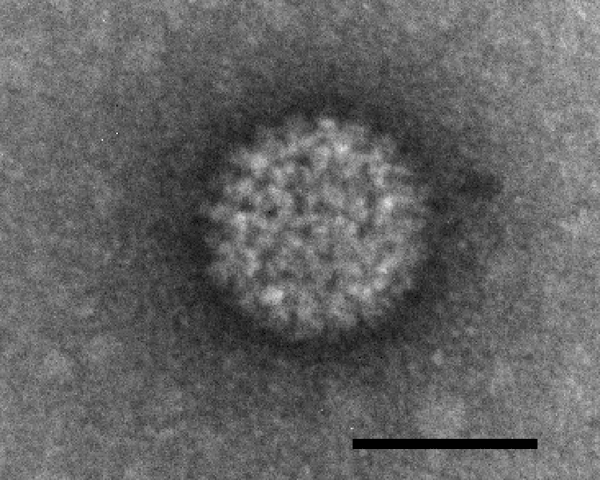
Bluetongue virus

Culicoides imicola is the main vector for BTV (bluetongue virus), with other Cullicoides species being secondary vectors. The periodic burst of C. imicola population has correlated with outbreaks of BTV, which often occur cyclically. As much as 90% of all BTV cases in the Mediterranean Basin has been linked to C. imicola, which is possibly due to its dry and hot summers that allow rapid larval maturation, which in turn leads to multiple generations hatching within a single season.

=== Other viruses ===
Culicoides imicola is also known to be the only field vector for the African horse sickness (AHS). In the past, AHS has only occurred periodically, no more than two years at a time. However, there has been occasions where it has persisted for over 5 years. The year-round presence of C. imicola in the face of climate change has been identified as the possible source of longer durations of AHS.

== Role of climate change ==
Traditionally, Culicoides imicola has been found in subtropical Asia and Africa. However, due to climate change, they have spread all the way to Europe and as far as Sweden. The increase in temperature has positively impacted C. imicola distribution, which has raised concern in the spread of disease across central Europe as the flies make their way northward. Without a significant improvement in epidemiological control measures, what is currently considered a once-in-20-years outbreak of bluetongue would occur as frequently as once in five or seven years by midcentury under all but the most optimistic climate change scenario.

=== Europe ===
The expansion of C. imicola out of its traditional Old World region of Africa and Asia may be a risk for significant spread orbivirus in the near future. Already, it is well distributed in Spain, Portugal, and several Greek islands; all of these area tend to be much warmer than their northern European counterparts. If temperatures continue to increase or stay roughly the same, the spread of these viral vectors will need to be properly prepared for and countered. Other species affecting Europe include C. obsoletus, C. pulicaris, C. nubeculosus and C. schultzei.

== Adult survival and dispersal ==
Culicoides imicola acclimated to different temperatures were found to have different survival capabilities in low temperatures but were about the same at high temperatures. Flies acclimated at 24 °C survived better at lower temperatures (-6 °C) while those at 29 °C did not get past -3 °C. However, there was no significant difference at higher temperature because once 42 °C was reached there was near total fatality. Due to the profound survival effect attributed to temperature, climate change altered the distribution and abundance of C. imicola.

== Future research ==
Much is left to be understood about C. imicola. Because of the many closely related species in the family, it is important to properly identify each individually as to prevent confounding different species together. Their thermal limits in larvae stages is also of interest, as that could further explain their distribution across the world. Additionally, because of the difficulty in laboratory conditions in matching field conditions, more research is needed to study how their life cycle plays out.
