= Kalissaye Avifaunal Reserve =

- IUCN category IV (habitat/species management area)
- Location within Senegal
- Location: Ziguinchor Region
- Nearest city: Ziguinchor
- Coordinates: 12°40′N 16°45′W
- Area: 0.16 km^{2} (0.062 sq mi)
- Established: 1978
- Visitors: 0 (in 2006)
- Website: web.archive.org/web/20090130135811/http://www.environnement.gouv.sn/article.php3?id_article=2

Ramsar Wetland
- Official name: Kalissaye
- Designated: 1 September 2017
- Reference no.: 2326

Kalissaye Avifaunal Reserve (KAR) is a small nature reserve in Senegal, located at the mouth of Kalissaye Pond in the middle of the Casamance River.

Like Basse Casamance National Park 35 km away, KAR is currently closed due to the Casamance Conflict.

== Flora ==
On the small sandy islands making up the reserve, vegetation consists mainly of Ipomoea pes-caprae, Sporobolus spicatus, and Alternanthera maritima.

== Fauna ==
The reserve was created in 1978 to protect sea turtle and seabird colonies.

There were more than 10,000 Caspian terns (Sterna caspia) in the reserve during the 1980s, and there are also many royal terns (Thalasseus maximus) and great white pelicans (Pelecanus onocrotalus).

Several sea turtle species are quite populous, including loggerheads (Caretta caretta) and green turtles (Chelonia mydas).

The common dolphin (Delphinus delphis) and the African manatee (Trichechus senegalensis) are also observed in the area.

== Climate change ==
In 2022, the IPCC Sixth Assessment Report included Kalissaye Avifaunal Reserve in the list of African natural heritage sites which would be threatened by flooding and coastal erosion by the end of the century, but only if climate change followed RCP 8.5, which is the scenario of high and continually increasing greenhouse gas emissions associated with the warming of over 4 °C., and is no longer considered very likely. The other, more plausible scenarios result in lower warming levels and consequently lower sea level rise: yet, sea levels would continue to increase for about 10,000 years under all of them. Even if the warming is limited to 1.5 °C, global sea level rise is still expected to exceed 2–3 m (7–10 ft) after 2000 years (and higher warming levels will see larger increases by then), consequently exceeding 2100 levels of sea level rise under RCP 8.5 (~0.75 m (2 ft) with a range of 0.5–1 m (2–3 ft)) well before the year 4000.

== See also ==
- List of national parks and nature reserves of Senegal
- Environment of Senegal
