= The Royal House of Boureh Gnilane Joof =

The Royal House of Boureh Gnilane Joof (Mbind Bure Ñilaan Juuf)
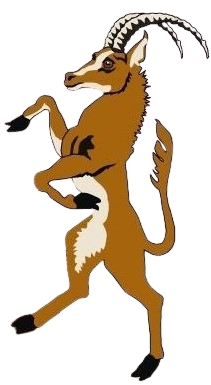
- The antelope and gazelle are the totems of the Joof family, the founders of this royal house. In the mythology of the Serer, it symbolises grace, royalty, wisdom, hardwork and protector.
- Parent house: Descendance of Lamane Jegan Joof (king and founder of Tukar) and Maad Ndaah Njemeh Joof (king of Laa, part of old Baol).
- Country: Kingdom of Sine and Kingdom of Saloum. Both Kingdoms now part of present-day Senegal.
- Founded: c. 1369
- Founder: Jaraff Boureh Gnilane Joof
- Final ruler: Maad a Sinig Kumba Ndoffene Fa Ndeb Joof (the last king of Sine from this royal house, died 1923). Maad a Sinig Mahecor Joof (last king of Sine from the Royal House of Semou Njekeh Joof, died 1969).
- Titles: Maad, Maad a Sinig and Maad Saloum
- Dissolution: 1969 dissolution Serer monarchies of Sine and Saloum following the deaths of Maad a Sinig Mahecor Joof and Maad Saloum Fode Ngoye Joof (king of Sine and Saloum respectively).

The Royal House of Boureh Gnilane Joof (variation : Mbin Boureh Gnilane or Mbind Bure Ñilaan Juuf in Serer) was a royal house founded in the 14th century by Jaraff Boureh Gnilane Joof (var : Bouré Gnilane Diouf or Buré Ñilaan). He was a member the Serer tribe, from the pre-colonial Kingdom of Sine now part of independent Senegal. It was the first royal house founded by the Joof family during the Guelowar period (1350 - 1969). Boureh Gnilane Joof was a royal prince and a Jaraff (var : Diaraf), a Serer title of nobility with the powers of a prime minister. He was neither a Maad a Sinig (king of Sine) nor a Maad Saloum (king of Saloum) but a royal prince who had the title Jaraff bestowed upon him by his cousin and brother-in-law - Maad a Sinig Diessanou Faye (king of Sine). His father Maad Patar Kholleh Joof (the conqueror) was the king of Laa and Teigne of Baol (king of Baol). Boureh's brothers were the first from this house to have succeeded to the throne of Sine during the Guelowar period. His name was adopted in his honour to refer to the first royal house founded by the Joof family during this dynastic period. The Joof family of Sine, from this royal house also ruled in the Kingdom of Saloum (the Joof paternal dynasty of Sine and Saloum) The Joof family also ruled in Baol (the Joof paternal dynasty of Baol). From the date of its foundation up to the abolition of the Serer monarchies of Sine and Saloum in 1969, at least ten kings from this house had succeeded to the throne of Sine. As the first royal house of Sine founded by the Joof family in this dynastic period, the Royal House of Boureh Gnilane Joof holds great significance in Senegambian, Joof family and Serer history, because all the subsequent royal houses founded by the Joof family (who ruled in three Senegambian kingdoms) branched out from this royal house.

== List of kings ==
The following is a list of kings from the Royal House of Boureh Gnilane Joof that reigned in the Serer kingdoms of Sine and Saloum. Their royal titles : Maad a Sinig and Maad Saloum signifies king of Sine and Saloum respectively. The surname Joof is the English spelling in the Gambia, whilst Diouf is the French spelling in Senegal. The proper spelling is Juuf or Juf in Serer which reflects the actual pronunciation (see Joof family) :

=== Kingdom of Sine ===
- Maad a Sinig Niokhobai Mane Nyan Joof, brother of Boureh Gnilane and the first Maad a Sinig (king of Sine) from this royal house. Reigned : c. 1369 - 1379
- Maad a Sinig Gejopal Mane Nyan Joof, brother of Boureh Gnilane and Maad a Sinig Niokhobai Mane Nyan Joof. Reigned : c. 1379 - 1394 During his reign, his reign, the Kingdom of Sine underwent a religious reformation (the religious reformation of Maad a Sinig Gejopal Mane Nyan Joof)
- Maad a Sinig Ama Kodu Joof, reigned : c. 1516 - 1534.
- Maad a Sinig Latsouk Gnilane Samba Joof, reigned : c. 1672 - 1688. During his reign, the Serer priestly class (the Saltigues) were public humiliated if the actual event differs from what they had divined at the Xooy ceremony (var : Khoy).
- Maad a Sinig Ama Kodu Samba Joof, reigned : c. 1715 -1724. He aided the Damel of Cayor at the Battle of Sanghai and defeated the Teigne of Baol.
- Maad a Sinig Boukar Tjilas Mahe Soum Joof, reigned : 1750 - 1763. He was the father of Lingeer Kodu Kumba Yandeh Mbarou Joof (many variations : Codou Coumba Yandé) the princess of Sine and queen mother of Cayor and Baol. Lingeer Kodu Kumba Yandeh Mbarou was the mother of Damel-Teigne Makodu Yandeh Mbarou Joof Faal (var : Macodou Codou Coumba Yandé), the king of Cayor and Baol (see Guelowar).
- Maad a Sinig Ama Kodu Mahe Ngom Joof, reigned 1770 - 1789. As well as chairing the meetings of the Saltigues during his reign, he also challenged their authority. Apart from his interference in religious matters, the Kingdom of Sine was very peaceful during his reign.
- Maad a Sinig Jaligue Sira Joof, reigned : 1885 - 1886 He came to the throne following a civil war brought on by the dynastic struggles of Maad a Sinig Amadi Baro Joof and Maad a Sinig Mbackeh Mak Njie. He died few months after succeeding to the throne. After his death, the Junjung of Sine was recovered from his estate and kept by his successor and former adversary (Maad a Sinig Mbackeh Mak).
- Maad a Sinig Niokhobai Semou Joof, reigned 1886 - 1887
- Maad a Sinig Kumba Ndoffene Fa Ndeb Joof. He was the last Serer king of Sine from this royal house. He died from illness in 1923.

=== Kingdom of Saloum ===
- Maad Saloum Malawtan Joof, originally from Sine. He was the longest reigning king of Saloum (45 years on the throne) and one of the most well known. Reigned : 1567 - 1612.
- Maad Saloum Ama-Joof Joof. His father came from Sine. On his maternal line, he was a Guelowar from the royal line of Lingeer Begay Souka (var : Bigué Souka). Reigned : 1690 - 1696 Like Malawtan Joof, many of his descendants that ruled Saloum partains to this royal house.

== See also ==
- The Royal House of Jogo Siga Joof
- The Royal House of Semou Njekeh Joof
- Kingdom of Sine
- Serer people
- Joof family
- Kingdom of Saloum
- Kingdom of Baol
- Joos Maternal Dynasty

== Bibliography ==
- Diouf, Niokhobaye, "Chronique du royaume du Sine", Suivie de notes sur les traditions orales et les sources écrites concernant le royaume du Sine par Charles Becker et Victor Martin. (1972). Bulletin de l'Ifan, Tome 34, Série B, n° 4, (1972).
- La famille Juuf [in] « L'épopée de Sanmoon Fay », [in] Éthiopiques, no 54, vol. 7, 2^{e} semestre 1991
- Sarr, Alioune, "Histoire du Sine-Saloum" (Sénégal). Introduction, bibliographie et notes par Charles Becker. Version légèrement remaniée par rapport à celle qui est parue en 1986-87 (extract)
- Klein, Martin. A., "Islam and Imperialism in Senegal Sine-Saloum, 1847-1914", Edinburgh University Press (1968), ISBN 0-85224-029-5
- Institut fondamental d'Afrique noire, "Bulletin de l'Institut fondamental d'Afrique noire: Sciences humaines, Volume 46", IFAN (1985), p 232
- Gravrand, Henry, "La civilisation Sereer, vol. 2. Pangool, Les Nouvelles Editions Africaines du Sénégal (1990), ISBN 2-7236-1055-1
- Phillips, Lucie Colvin, Historical dictionary of Senegal, Scarecrow Press (1981), pp 52-71 ISBN 0-8108-1369-6
- Institut fondamental d'Afrique noire, Bulletin de l'Institut fondamental d'Afrique noire, Volume 38. IFAN (1976), pp 557-504
- List of kings of Saloum by king « Fodé Diouf » [in] Brigaud, Félix, "Histoire traditionnelle du Sénégal", Études sénégalaises, n° 9, St-Louis, CRDS, (1962), pp 161–162
- Ba, Abdou Bouri, "Essai sur l’histoire du Saloum et du Rip". Avant-propos par Charles Becker et Victor Martin, BIFAN, Tome 38, Série B, n° 4, octobre (1976)
- "Notes africaines, Issues 145-156", Institut fondamental d'Afrique noire, Institut français d'Afrique noire, (1975), p 111
