= Joof family =

Serer clan of Senegambia, West Africa

Joof family; (Njuufeen)
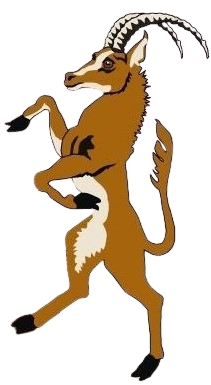
- The totem and symbol of the Joof family is the antelope and gazelle, symbolizing grace, royalty, wisdom, hard work and protection in Serer mythology.
- Country: Kingdom of Baol; Kingdom of Sine; Kingdom of Saloum; Takrur (the Serers lineage; Senegal (present-day); Gambia (former colony of Saloum); Mauritania (previously as Lamanes)
- Founder: Lamane Jegan Joof (c. 11th century); Maad Ndaah Njemeh Joof (c. 1290)
- Final ruler: Maad a Sinig Mahecor Joof (King of Sine, 1924–1969); Maad Saloum Fode N'Gouye Joof (King of Saloum, 1935–1969); Lamane Njaga Dibor Ndoffene Joof (Lamane Diaga Dibor Ndofene Diouf) – Lamane of Tukar (2004)
- Titles: Lamane; Maad; Maad a Sinig; Teigne; Maad Saloum; Bour
- Dissolution: 1969 (last kings of Sine and Saloum), 2004 last known Lamane of Tukar. Sine and Saloum reinstated their monarchies as constitutional monarchs in 2019 and 2017 respectively. Maad a Sinig Niokhobaye Fatou Diène Diouf is the current King of Sine as of 2025 (reign 2019―present)
- Cadet branches: The Royal House of Boureh Gnilane Joof; The Royal House of Jogo Siga Joof; The Royal House of Semou Njekeh Joof

The Joof family is one of the old Senegambian royal families of Serer ethnicity.

The surname Joof, also spelt Juuf or Juf (in Serer and Cangin), Joof (English spelling in the Gambia) or Diouf (French spelling in Senegal and Mauritania), is a surname that is typically Serer. Though there are multiple spellings for this surname, they all refer to the same people. The differences in spelling came about because Senegal and Mauritania were colonized by France, while the Gambia was colonized by the United Kingdom. Although spelt differently, they are pronounced the same way.

The totem and symbol of the Joof family is the antelope and gazelle, the symbol of grace, royalty, wisdom, hard work and protection in Serer mythology. The name of their clan is Njuufeen (in Serer). The Joof family of Guelowar matrilineage also have another totem called Mbossé (a form of lizard, as in the Mbosseh festival). They are the only ones permitted by custom and the rules governing totemic prohibitions to make libations to this reptile (not be confused with the primordial tree in Serer cosmogony) Members of the Joof family from other Serer maternal clans also have their own maternal totems (see that article).

Members of this family had ruled over many of the pre-colonial kingdoms of Senegambia, including the Kingdom of Sine, the Kingdom of Saloum and the Kingdom of Baol. The royal princesses (Lingeers) from the Joof family were also given in marriage to the pre-colonial kings and princes of Senegambia. Some of these included the kings of Jolof, kings of Waalo, kings of Cayor and Baol (after 1549 following the Battle of Danki). From these marriages, they provided many heirs to the thrones of these kingdoms. Although usually associated with Serer royalty, the Joof family also figure prominently in Serer religious affairs.

== History of the Joof family ==
=== The Wagadou period ===
The Joof family is one of the old families of Senegambia. Serer oral tradition speaks of a noble called Lamane Jegan Joof, owner of a large herd of livestock and estate who was also a farmer. He migrated from Lambaye following an argument with his relative, the king of Lambaye. The dispute concerned the governance of Lambaye and over-taxation of his herd which he considered unjust. As such, he decided to head south and founded Tukar with his younger brother Ndik Joof. The tradition then went on to say that, he had a son called Sosseh Joof (Socé Diouf) who was the heir of Tukar. Some scholars have proposed that, Tukar (and many of its surrounding villages such as Njujuf, Sob, etc., which were founded by Lamane Jegan Joof making them part of his estate and colony) now a rather large village in present-day Senegal, is an ancient village and well before the Guelowar period (1335) and placed the foundation of these villages in the 11th century, if not earlier. The Joof family had ruled Tukar for many centuries, inherited from their ancestor Lamane Jegan Joof through the Serer Lamanic custom, a rather strict custom of Serer land law and inheritance. In 2004, Lamane Njaga Dibor Ndoffene Joof (Lamane Diaga Dibor Ndofene Diouf) was the last lamane of Tukar.

In the early history of the Ghana Empire to its end, the royal princesses of the Empire married into the Serer aristocratic families, some of these included Joof family. These royal princesses belonged to the maternal clan Wagadou (Bagadou in Serer language). With the Joof paternal clan, they ruled the Kingdom of Baol and provided many kings from the patrilineage Joof (the Joof paternal dynasty of Baol). Some of these kings include Boureh Joof (Bouré Diouf), Guidiane Joof (Guidiane Diouf), Ma Joof, Jinak Dialane [probably Gnilane] Joof, Maguinak Joof, etc. These kings preceded the Guelowar period by at least two or three centuries and long before the Fall paternal dynasty of Baol and Cayor who inherited the throne around 1549 after the Battle of Danki. The general consensus is that, after the demise of the Joof paternal and Wagadou maternal dynasties of Baol with other Serer paternal dynasties who jointly ruled Baol, the Fall paternal dynasty succeeded them, hence the first Damels and Teignes (titles of the kings of Cayor and Baol, respectively) from the Fall patrilineage were of Wagadou maternal descent. They simply married into the old royal family and succeeded to the throne.

The 11th-century legendary figure Amar Godomat or Ama Gôdô Maat, né. Ama Kodu Joof, is a member of this family. Ama is also known as Xamakodu Fa Maak (meaning Hamacodou The Elder, in Serer).

=== The Guelowar period ===
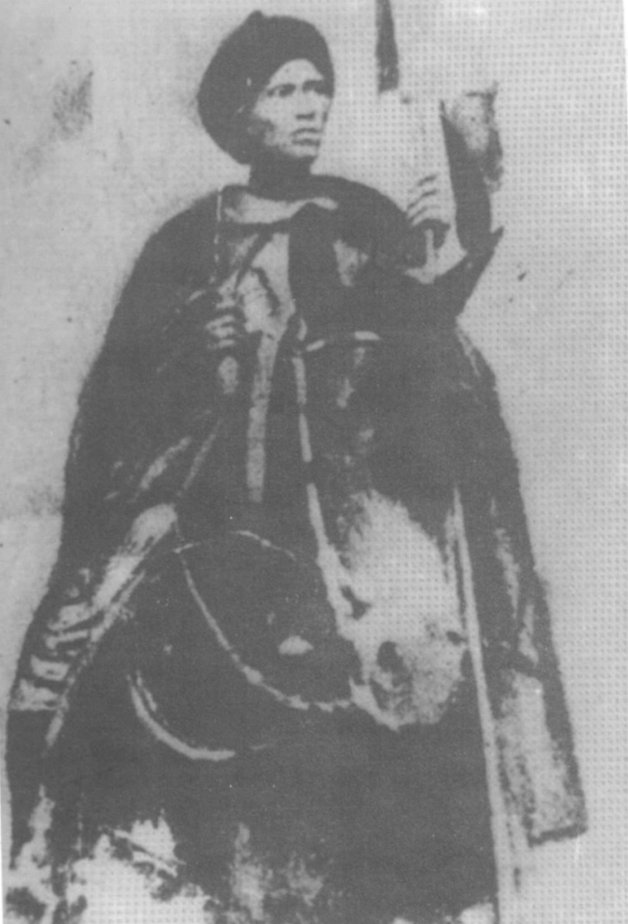
Maad a Sinig Kumba Ndoffene Fa Ndeb Joof, from The Royal House of Boureh Gnilane Joof, King of Sine from c. 1898 to 1924

The Guelowar period starts from 1350 during the reign of the first Guelowar king of Sine - Maad a Sinig Maysa Wali and ends in 1969 after the death of the last king of Sine and Saloum (Maad a Sinig Mahecor Joof and Maad Saloum Fode N'Gouye Joof respectively).

Maysa Wali and his family (the maternal clan Guelowar) fled Kaabu in 1335 following a dynastic struggle. They were defeated by the Ñaanco maternal dynasty of Kaabu (their extended relatives) and were granted asylum in the Kingdom of Sine by a Serer noble Council called The Great Council of Lamanes. Having served as legal advisor to this noble Council for 15 years, Maysa Wali managed to win the confidence and trust of the council and the common people. He was nominated and elected by the council and the people as king of Sine. He was the first Guelowar king of Sine. He gave his sisters in marriage to the Serer nobility which sealed the union between Serer and Guelowar. It was the offspring of these marriages between the old Serer paternal noble clans and the Guelowar maternal clan of Kaabu that ruled the kingdom of Sine and later Saloum. In this Guelowar period, the Joof family (one of the oldest Serer paternal noble clans) provided many kings in the Kingdoms of Sine and Saloum (the Joof paternal dynasty of Sine and Saloum). The Joof family also founded three royal houses as follows (in the order of foundation):

- The Royal House of Boureh Gnilane Joof (Serer: Mbind Bure Nilaan, other: Keur Bouré Gnilane)
- The Royal House of Jogo Siga Joof (Serer: Mbind Jogo Siga, other: Keur Diogo Siga)
- The Royal House of Semou Njekeh Joof (Serer: Mbind Sem-Jike, other: Keur Semou Djiké or Keur Semou Ndiké)

They all trace their descent to Maad Ndaah Njemeh Joof (also known as Bour Ndaah Ndiémé Diouf or Ndaah Njeeme Juuf) - the king of Laah (or Laa) in Baol, around the 13th century. Maad Ndaah Njemeh Joof was the father of Maad Niokhobai Joof (also king of Laa) who was the father of the Great

Maad Xole Joof (né: Xole Njuug Juuf (King of Paataar) - the conqueror of Baol as Teigne, was the first of the Joof family to marry a Guelowar (Maad a Sinig Maysa Wali's niece). From that marriage, he had Maad a Sinig Niokhobai Mane Nyan Joof (French: Niokhobaye Mane Niane Diouf) and Maad a Sinig Gejopal Mane Nyan Joof (French: Guédiopal Niane Mane Diouf), who were the first kings of Sine during the Guelowar period from the patrilineage Joof. Their brother Jaraff Boureh Gnilane Joof (French: Diaraf Bouré Gnilane Diouf) was not a king of Sine, but a Jaraff (equivalent of Prime Minister), who gave his name to the first Royal House of the Joof Dynasty (in the Guelowar period) and it is from that "The Royal House of Boureh Gnilane Joof" derived from, which provided several kings in Sine and Saloum. The Joof Dynasty that succeeded to the throne of Saloum came from Sine.

=== Historic battles involving this family ===
This table lists some of the historic battles of Senegambia involving the kings or princes belonging to this family:

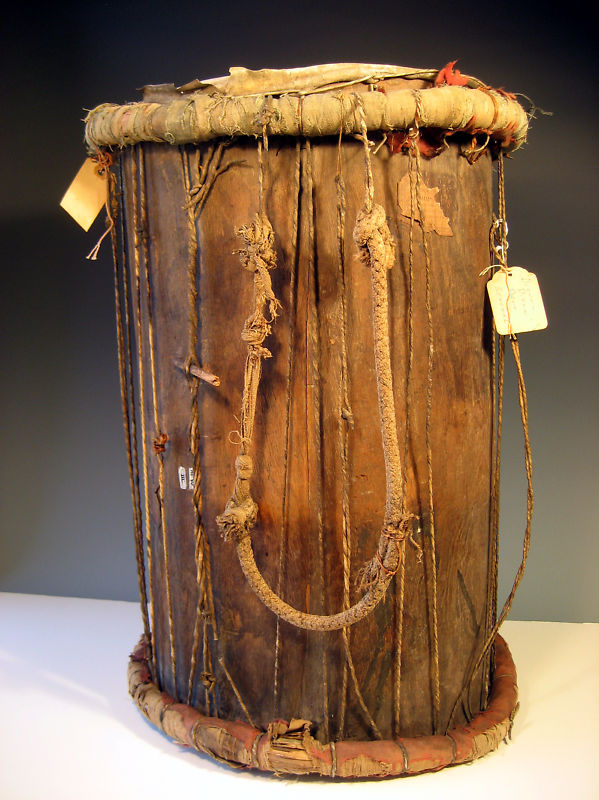
The Junjung: the Serer war drum of Sine (19th century)

Name of the battle	Member of the clan	Opponent	Reason for the battle	Victor
The Battle of Nganiane	Maad Xole Joof (The Conqueror, né: Xole Njuug Juuf)	Teigne Kurambissan of Baol (King of Baol)	Empire building	Maad Xole Joof, King of Paataar
The Battle of Diakhao	Maad a Sinig Jogo Gnilane Joof	Mamadou Koungo (of Koungheul)	Religion	Maad a Sinig Jogo Gnilane Joof
The Battle of Mbellondiaré	Maad a Sinig Amakodou Samba Joof (assisting the Damel of Cayor)	Teigne of Baol	Dynastic war between the Damel of Cayor (king of Cayor) and Teigne of Baol	Maad a Sinig Amakodou Samba Joof and the Damel of Cayor
The Battle of Sanghaie	Maad a Sinig Amakodou Samba Joof	Teigne of Baol	Empire building	Maad a Sinig Amakodou Samba Joof
The Battle of Gagnane	Maad a Sinig Jogoy Gnilane Joof	Damel-Teigne Lat Soukabe Ngoneh Jaay Fall	Empire building	Damel-Teigne Lat Soukabe Ngoneh Jaay Fall
The Battle of Ndoffène	The Sandigue Ndiob Niokhobai Joof (The warlord)	Maad a Sinig Njaak Faye	The Sandigue Ndiob Niokhobai Joof was fighting for the succession of his young son Maad a Sinig Ama Joof Gnilane Faye Joof	The Sandigue Ndiob Niokhobai Joof
The Battle of Tioupane	The Sandigue Ndiob Niokhobai Joof	Maad a Sinig Ama Kumba Mbodj and his younger brother Barka Mbodj	The Sandigue Ndiob Niokhobai Joof was fighting for the succession of his young son Maad a Sinig Ama Joof Gnilane Faye Joof	The Sandigue Ndiob Niokhobai Joof
The Battle of Logandème	Maad a Sinig Kumba Ndoffene Famak Joof	Louis Faidherbe (French governor of Senegal) Émile Pinet-Laprade	Resistance against French colonialism	France
The Surprise of Mbin o Ngor (This was not an open battle but a surprise attack, also known as Mbeetan Keur Ngor).	Maad a Sinig Kumba Ndoffene Famak Joof	Maba Diakhou Bâ, Damel-Teigne Lat Jor Ngoneh Latir Jobe and their Marabout armies	Religion, vendetta and empire building	Indecisive. The marabout army withdrew when reinforcement finally arrived, but caused severe damage before retreating.
The Battle of Fandane-Thiouthioune (also known as The Battle of Somb)	Maad a Sinig Kumba Ndoffene Famak Joof	Maba Diakhou Bâ, Damel-Teigne Lat Jor Ngoneh Latir Jobe and their Marabout armies	Religion, vendetta and empire building	Maad a Sinig Kumba Ndoffene Famak Joof

=== Genealogy ===
A short genealogy showing the descendants of Maad Ndaah Njemeh Joof.

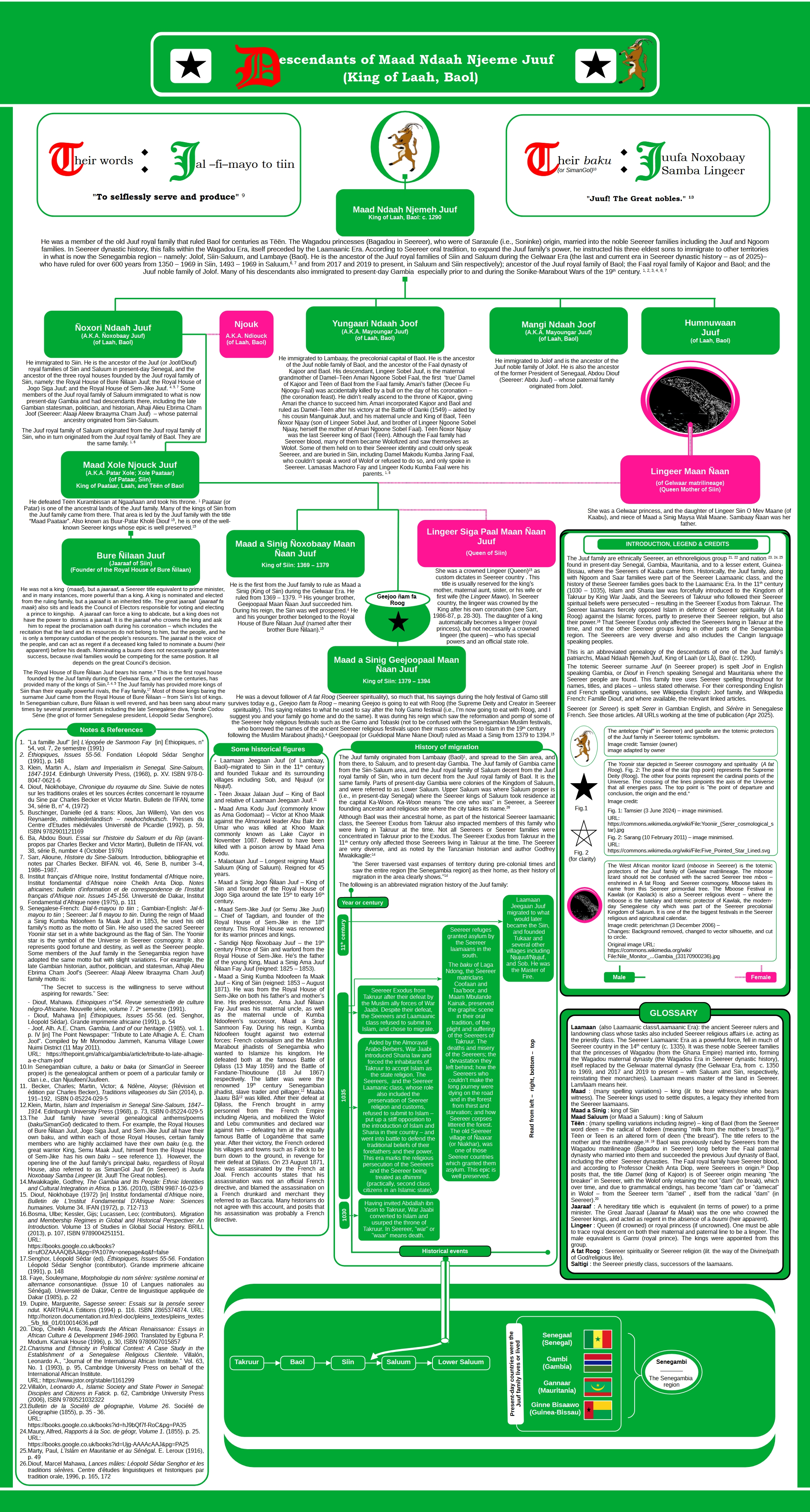

== Status in Serer religion ==
The Joof family figure prominently in Serer religion. Many of the Serer Pangool (saints and ancestral spirits) came from this family. Though associated with Serer royalty, this family's involvement in Serer religious affairs are found within the hermeneutics of Serer religion and traditions. Some of the sacred Serer sites regularly venerated were founded or headed by this family which underpins their involvement in the Pangool cult. Some of these venerated sites includes Tagdiam, residence of Maad Semou Njekeh Joof who is associated with the cult of Tagdiam; and Tukar, founded by Lamane Jegan Joof. In the Serer religious calendar, the Raan festival which takes place once a year after the new moon is held in Tukar.

== Personalities with the surname Joof, Diouf, Juuf or Juf ==
The surname Joof, Diouf, Juuf or Juf is carried by several personalities, some of which include:

=== Royalty ===
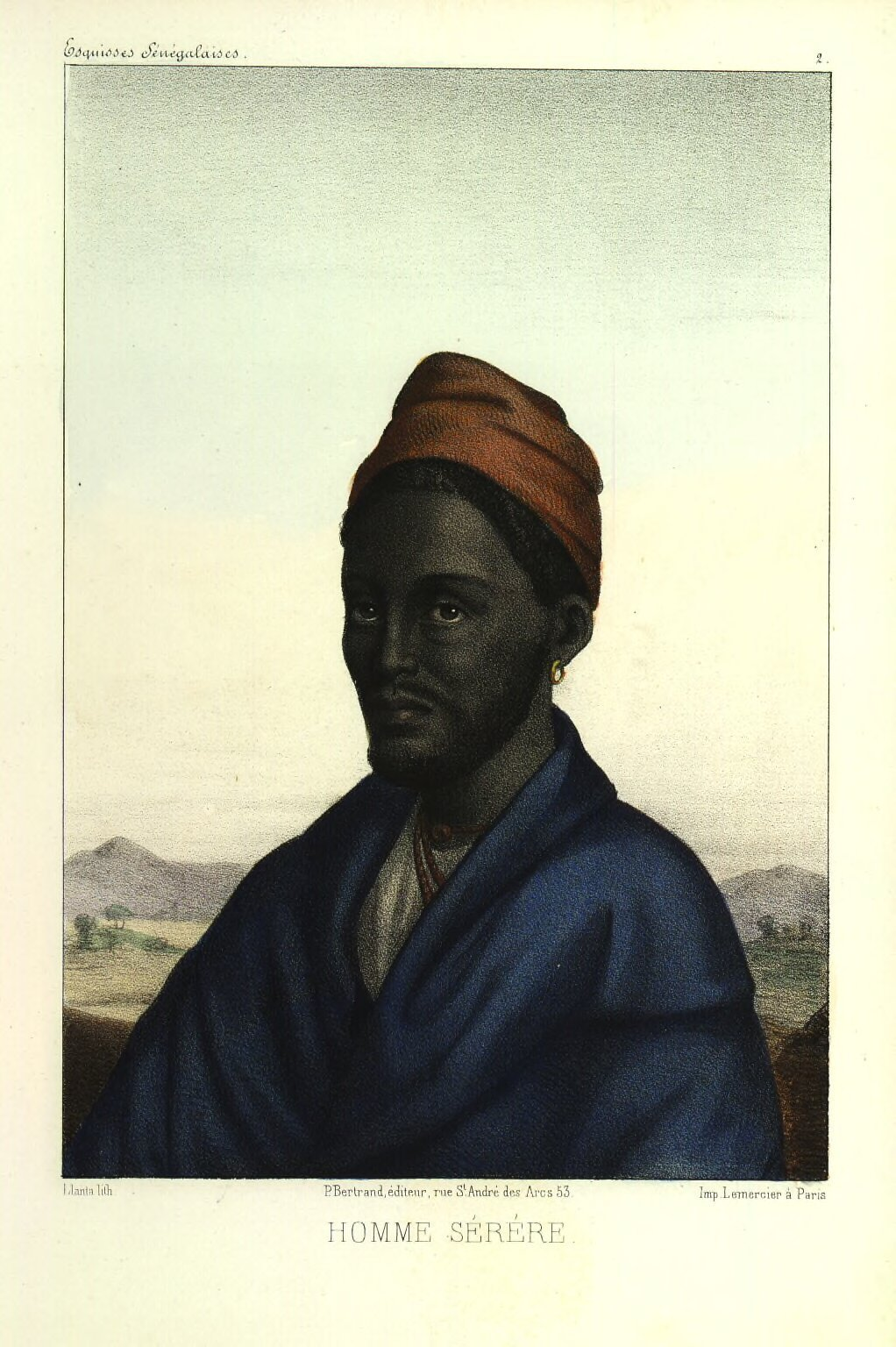
Maad a Sinig Ama Joof Gnilane Faye Joof (king of Sine). Reigned c. 1825–53). From The Royal House of Semou Njekeh Joof. Portrait by David Boilat taken in 1850 when he visited Joal. Catalogued in his work Esquisses sénégalaises in 1853, the year the king died.

==== Kingdom of Baol ====
- Lamane Jegan Joof, founder of Tukar in the medieval era (11th century)
- Maad Ndaah Njemeh Joof, king of Laa (Baol; c. 1290)
- Maad Xole Joof (né: Xole Njuug Juuf (of Paataar), The Conqueror)), King of Paataar, Lâ (Baol), and Teigne of Baol (c. 14th century)
- Teigne Jinaax Jalaan Joof (or Teeñ Jinaax Jalaan Juuf), King of Baol (Lambaye). Relative of Lamane Jegan Joof.

==== Kingdom of Sine ====
- Maad a Sinig Boukar Tjilas Sanghaie Joof, king of Sine (reigned 1724–35), son of Maad Semou Njekeh Joof
- Maad a Sinig Ama Joof Gnilane Faye Joof, king of Sine (reigned 1825–53)
- Lingeer Gnilane Jogoy Joof, wife of Maat Souka Ndela Joof (parents of Maad a Sinig Kumba Ndoffene Famak Joof)
- Maad a Sinig Kumba Ndoffene Famak Joof, king of Sine (reigned 1853–71)
- Maad a Sinig Semou Mak Joof, king of Sine (reigned 1878–82)
- Maad a Sinig Amadi Baro Joof, king of Sine (reigned 1882–84)
- Maad a Sinig Jaligui Sira Joof, king of Sine (reigned 1885–86)
- Maad a Sinig Niokhobai Joof, king of Sine (reigned 1886–87)
- Maad a Sinig Kumba Ndoffene Fa Ndeb Joof, king of Sine (reigned 1898–1924)
- Maad a Sinig Mahecor Joof, king of Sine (reigned 1924–69)
- Lamane Diaga Dibor Ndofene Diouf, lamane of Tukar, last Lamane of Tukar as of 2004.
- Maad a Sinig Niokhobaye Fatou Diène Diouf (reign 2019―present). In 2019, the Serer people of Sine decided to reinstate their monarchy, and Niokhobaye Diène Diouf was selected as Maad a Sinig (King of Sine). He is the current King of Sine as of 2025. On his paternal side, he belongs to the Royal House of Semou Njekeh Joof, and matrilineally, of Guelowar maternal descent. The Serers of Saloum also reinstated their monarchy in 2017, and chose Niokhobaye's maternal uncle, Thierno Coumba Daga Ndao as Maad Saloum (king of Saloum)―also of Guelowar matrilineage. As Sine and Saloum are now part of independent Senegal, these two kings rule as constitutional monarchs. Unlike their predecessors who were absolute monarchs, these two kings have no official powers. Their role is merely ceremonial and diplomatic. Niokhobaye however, does have some influence, and has been able to utilise the old pleasant cousinship between the Serer and Jola people by liaising with the King of Oussouye (Maan Sibiloumbaye Diédhiou) to help effect economic and cultural development, as well as bring about peace in Casamance―following decades long of the Casamance conflict―which has been a major problem of consequetive Gambian and Senegalese presidents since in 1982.

==== Kingdom of Saloum ====
- Maad Saloum Semou Jimit Joof, king of Saloum (reigned 1894–98)
- Maad Saloum Ndeneh Jogop Joof, king of Saloum (reigned 1901–11)
- Maad Saloum Semou N'Gouye Joof, king of Saloum (reigned 1911–13)
- Maat Saloum Gori Joof, king of Saloum (reigned 1913–19)
- Maad Saloum Mahawa Choro Joof, king of Saloum (reigned 1919–35)
- Maad Saloum Fode N'Gouye Joof, king of Saloum (reigned 1935–69)

==== Kingdom of Jolof ====
- Lingeer Penda Kumba Ngouille Joof, queen consort and queen mother of Jolof (wife of Bour ba Jolof Bakan Tam Boury Nabou Njie, king of Jolof, 1768–69)

==== Kingdom of Cayor ====
- Manguinak Joof, appointed Ber Jak of Cayor (equivalent of Prime Minister) by his first cousin Damel Amari Ngoneh Sobell Fall after he assisted him defeat the king of Jolof at the Battle of Danki (1549).

==== Royal houses (Guelowar period) ====
- The Royal House of Boureh Gnilane Joof, the first royal house founded by the Joof family during the Guelowar period. Founded by Jaraff Boureh Gnilane Joof in the 14th century.
- The Royal House of Jogo Siga Joof, the second royal house founded by the Joof family. Founded by Maad a Sinig Jogo Gnilane Joof c. 16th century. Unlike the other two royal houses, this royal house did not provide many kings.
- The Royal House of Semou Njekeh Joof, the third and last royal house founded by the Joof family. This royal house was founded by Maad Semou Njekeh Joof in the 18th century.

=== Academic world ===
- Ismaïla Diouf, professor of mathematics at the Université Cheikh Anta Diop (Dakar, Sénégal)
- Mamadou Diouf, Senegalese historian, professor at the University of Michigan
- Arona N'doffène Diouf, professor at the University of North Carolina
- Sylviane Diouf, historian and author
- Cheikh Diouf, historian and essayist
- Marcel Mahawa Diouf, a Senegalese historian, theologian and author on Serer religion, traditions and history.
- Babacar Sédikh Diouf, a Senegalese historian and author on Serer history
- Moustapha Diouf, a Senegalese sociologist and professor at the University of Vermont

=== Politics ===
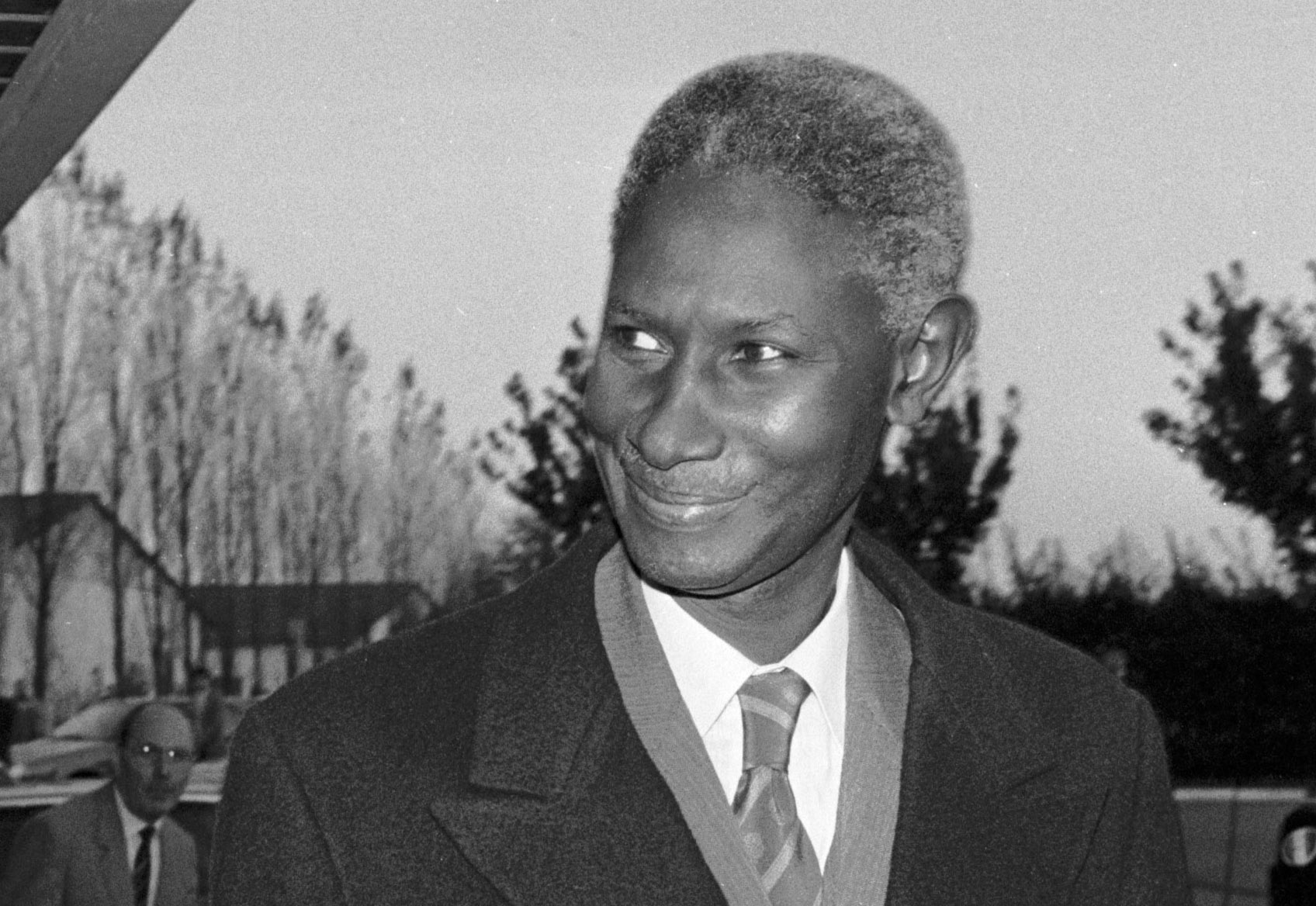
Abdou Diouf, second president of Senegal

- Ngalandou Diouf (1875–1941), Senegalese politician of the colonial era and parliamentarian of the French Chamber of Deputies
- Abdou Diouf (born 1935), Senegalese politician, second president of Senegal and former Secretary-General of the Organisation internationale de la Francophonie
- Badara Joof (died 2023), Gambian politician and Vice-President from 2022 to 2023
- Coumba Ndoffène Diouf, Senegalese politician who held several cabinet posts. Former Foreign Minister of Senegal, Minister of Public Health and Social Affairs.
- George St. Clair Joof (1907–1955), Gambian politician and barrister
- Lucretia St. Clair Joof (1913–1982), Gambian politician and the first woman in the House of Representatives (the Gambia)
- Diaraf Diouf (1925–2006), Senegalese politician and engineer, who held several ministerial posts before and after Senegal's independence.
- Jacques Diouf, Senegalese politician Director-General of The Food and Agriculture Organization of the United Nations (FAO)
- Madior Diouf (born 1939) Senegalese politician and professor of literature at the Université Cheikh Anta Diop. Member and leader of the National Democratic Rally.
- Mame Birame Souleymane Diouf (also Mame Biram Souleyman Diouf), Senegalese politician, economist and Deputy Mayor of Sokone (Senegal).
- Ibra Diouf, member of The Pan-African Parliament
- Abdoulaye Diouf Sarr, minister in the Senegal government until 2022

=== Legal profession ===
Some of these legal professionals have ventured into politics but they are more known for their legal than for their political occupation :

- Alhaji Bai Modi Joof (1933–1993) (Alhaji B.M. Joof), Gambian barrister, legal adviser to the Gambia Press Union and defender of free speech. Commonly known as Lawyer Joof (not to be confused with the younger Joseph Henry Joof, who is also known as Lawyer Joof), younger brother of Alhaji Alieu Ebrima Cham Joof.
- Joseph Henry Joof (born 1960), Gambian barrister, attorney general and politician.

=== Medicine ===
- Professor Boucar Diouf, member of the International Society of Nephrology, member of the African board of the Commission for the Global Advancement of Nephrology (COMGAN), member of the African Associations of Nephrology, President and founder-member of the Senegalese Society of Nephrology (SESONEPH)

=== Sports ===
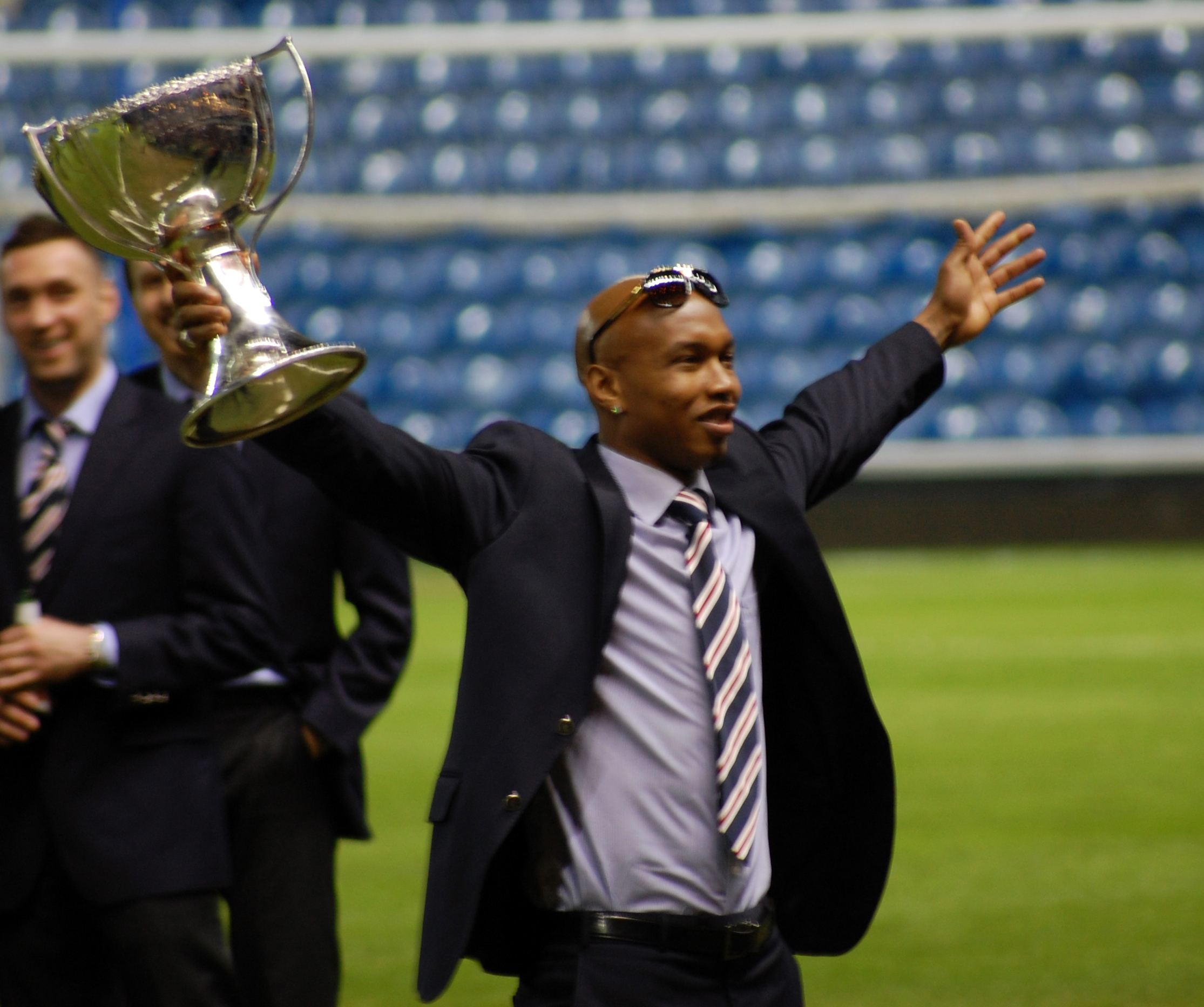
El-Hadji Diouf. Professional footballer. Pictured after winning the Scottish League Cup with Glasgow Rangers.

● El Hadji Malick Diouf (born 2004) professional footballer who plays for West Ham United F.C.

- Robert Diouf, professional Senegalese wrestler and former champion.
- El Hadji Diouf (born 1981), Senegalese footballer, winner of many trophies as well as the 2002 BBC African Footballer of the Year award.
- Dame Diouf, Senegalese footballer and elder brother of El Hadji Diouf.
- Pa'Malick Joof (born 1985), Gambian footballer and former player of SV Wilhelmshaven.
- Mamadou Diouf, Senegalese footballer who played for FC Metz.
- El Hadji Diouf (footballer, born 1988) (not be confused with the other El Hadji Diouf), also a professional footballer.
- Mamadou Diouf, professional basketball player and a member of the Senegalese national basketball team.
- Pape Diouf (proper: Mababa Diouf, born 1951), former journalist and president of Olympique de Marseille (2005–2009)
- Mame Biram Diouf (born 1987), Senegalese footballer who plays for Turkish side Konyaspor.
- Mame Tacko Diouf (born 1976), Senegalese 400 metres hurdler.
- Mame Diodio Diouf (born 1984), Senegalese basketball player.
- Valentina Diouf (born 1993), Italian volleyball player.
- Kalidou Diouf (born 1994), German basketball player and journalist.
- Yehvann Diouf

=== Music and entertainment ===
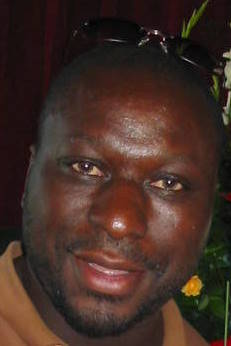
Pierre Moustapha Diouf, commonly known as Mouss Diouf, a renowned actor who had worked with personalities like Ousmane Sembène.

- Boucar Diouf, Senegalese humorist
- Élage Diouf, musician, percussionist and composer, band member of the Diouf Brothers (Les frères Diouf).
- Pape Abdou Karim Diouf, brother of Élage Diouf and member of the Diouf Brothers band.
- Mouss Diouf (born 1964), actor
- Tamsier Joof, dancer, choreographer, radio personality and businessman
- Hella Joof, actress and director (of Gambian descent).
- Mamadou Diouf, musician and songwriter

=== Visual arts ===
The definition of art is very broad. This section list the names of visual artists (in its narrowest definition) who share this surname:

- Cheikh Diouf, professional artist. His work is primarily based on African art, winner of many awards

=== Business and commerce ===
- Abdoulie Joof, a Gambian tycoon, commonly known as Lie Joof, implicated in several controversies including the financing of a coup d'etat to overthrow president Yahya Jammeh.

=== Multi-discipline ===
The following list gives the names of personalities with this surname who are experts in a variety of professions, and are equally known for each of these professions. Their professional life is so wide and varied that they can not be easily described by a single category:

- Alhaji Alieu Ebrima Cham Joof (1924–2011), a Gambian Statesman, author, historian, politician, trade unionist, nationalist, broadcaster, etc.

=== Other ===
- The Diouf brothers (Les frères Diouf), music band from Senegal. The band consists of Élage Diouf (El Hadji Fall Diouf) and Pape Abdou Karim Diouf.

== See also ==
- Faye family
