= Ama Joof Gnilane Faye Joof =

19th-century Sine king

Maad a Sinig Ama Joof Gnilane Faye Joof
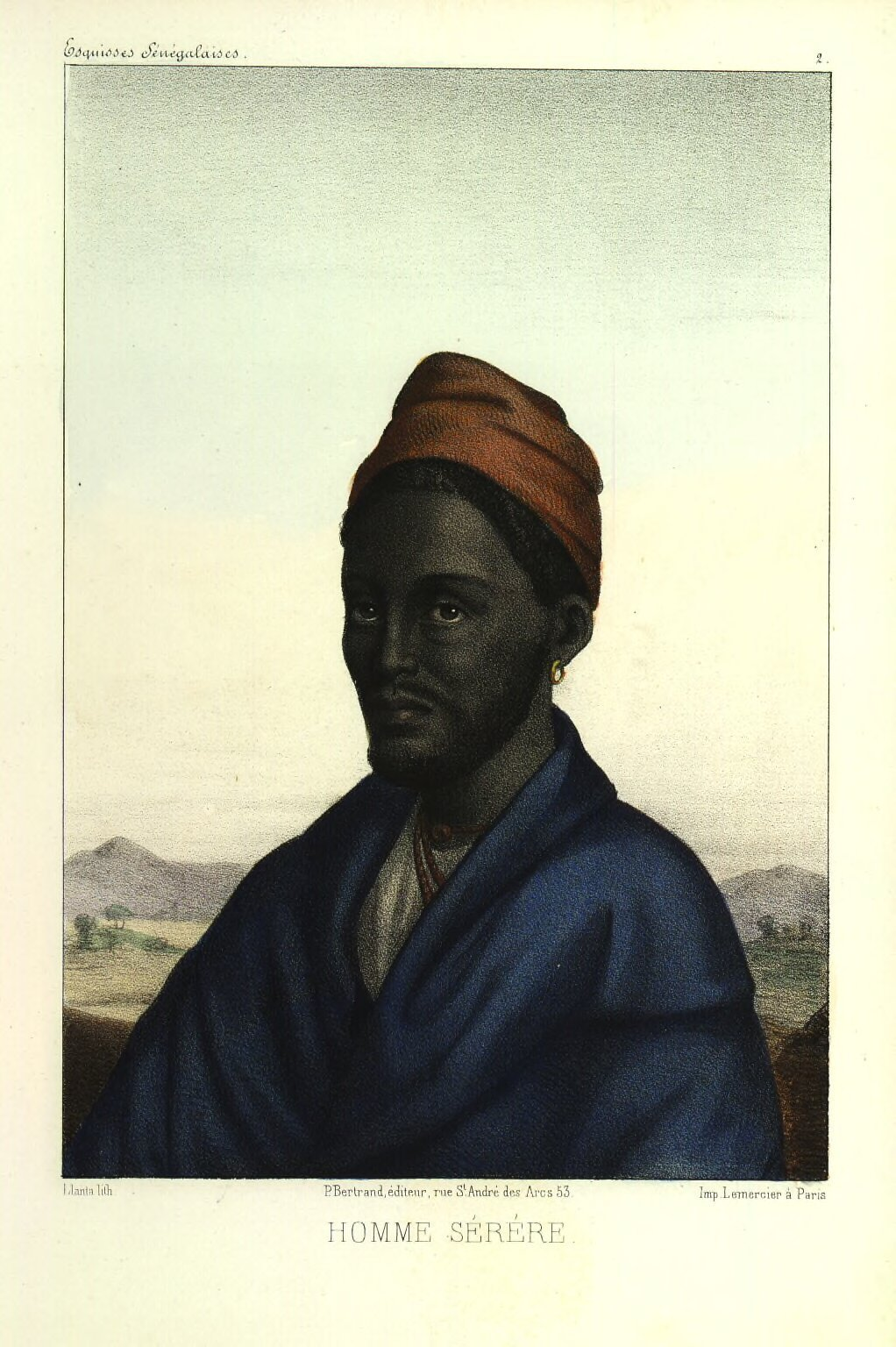

Maad a Sinig Ama Joof Gnilane Faye Joof. King of Sine. Reigned : c. 1825 to 1853. From The Royal House of Semou Njekeh Joof. He is one of few pre-colonial Senegambian kings imortalised in a portrait. Watercolor Sketches of David Boilat in Esquisses sénégalaises 1853, original portrait taken in 1850 when Boilat visited Joal. List: Kingdom of Sine (1825–1853)
- Reign: 1825–1853
- Coronation: c. 1825; Crowned at Diakhao, Kingdom of Sine, present-day Senegal
- Predecessor: Maad a Sinig Njaak Wagam Gnilane Faye (Maad a Sinig). Ama Kumba Mbodj (regent).
- Heir-apparent: Maad a Sinig Kumba Ndoffene Famak Joof
- Born: Diakhao, Kingdom of Sine, present-day Senegal
Names
- Maad a Sinig Ama Joof Gnilane Faye Joof
- House: The Royal House of Semou Njekeh Joof founded by Maad Semou Njekeh Joof in the 18th century
- Father: Sandigui N'Diob Niokhobai Joof
- Mother: Lingeer Gnilane Faye
- Religion: Serer religion

Maad a Sinig Ama Joof Gnilane Faye Joof (many variations of his name include: Ama Joof, Amat Diouf, Amajuf Ñilan Fay Juf, Amadiouf Diouf, Ama Diouf Faye, Ama Diouf Gnilane Faye Diouf, Ramat Dhiouf) was a king of Sine, now part of present-day Senegal. He reigned from c. 1825 to 1853. He was fluent in several languages. He came from the Royal House of Semou Njekeh Joof (the third and last royal house founded by the Joof family of Sine and Saloum in the 18th century). Maad a Sinig (variations: Mad Sinig, etc.) means king of Sine in the Serer-Sine language. The term Bur Sine (variations: Buur Sine or Bour Sine) is also used interchangeably with the proper title Maad a Sinig or Mad a Sinig. They both mean king Sine. Bour Sine is usually used by the Wolof people when referring to the Serer kings of Sine. The Serer people generally used the term Maad a Sinig or Mad a Sinig when referring to their kings.

== Family history ==
The king was the son of the Sandigue Ndiob Niokhobai Joof and Lingeer Gnilane Faye. Lingeer means royal princess or queen mother. Sandigue Ndiob (or Sandigui N'Diob) is a title of nobility and a rather important and powerful figure in pre-colonial Sine. It designates the village chief of N'Diob (var: Ndiob) near the border of Baol. His father (the Sandigue Ndiob) belongs to the Serer paternal dynasty of Sine and Saloum of the family Joof. He was a royal prince himself and a warlord. Lingeer Gnilane Faye (his mother), partains to the Faye family of Sine. On her maternal line she was a member of the Guelowar maternal dynasty.

== Succession ==
Serer royal and religious titles
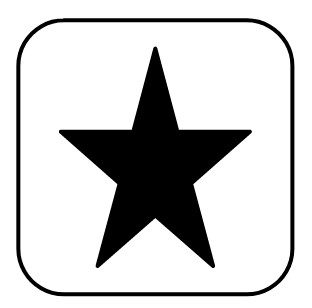
- Royal titles
- Lamane (also religious)
- Maad
- Maad a Sinig
- Maad Saloum
- Teigne
- Lingeer
- Line of succession
- Buumi
- Thilas
- Loul Religious titles
- Saltigue

Ama Joof Gnilane Faye Joof was crowned Maad a Sinig (king of Sine) in his early teens, when he was about 12 or 15 years. Although dynastic wars between the various royal houses were prevalent at the time, he succeeded to the throne without having to engage in battle. His father, the powerful warlord and Sandigui N'Diob Niokhobai Joof, secured his succession to the throne of Sine by defeating other royal houses in battle. Niokhobai Joof was not eligible to rule at that time. Although a member of the Joof Dynasty, his mother was a noble, but was not a Guelowar (the reigning maternal dynasty). To become a king, a prince must be able to trace royal descent both on his paternal and maternal line. Having secured the succession of his son, he permitted the uncle of Ama Joof Gnilane Faye Joof (Ama Kumba Mbodj, variations: Ama Coumba M'Bodj or Amakoumba Mbodg) to rule as regent until Ama Joof Gnilane Faye Joof reached maturity. His son (Ama Joof Gnilane Faye Joof) was quite young at the time, about 7 years old. When Ama Kumba Mbodg and his younger brother Bakar Mbodg plotted to disinherit Ama Joof Gnilane Faye Joof, which went against the agreement, Niokhobai Joof commanded the Joof family of Sine and Saloum for the last time and defeated the Mbodg princes and their armies at The Battle of Tioupane. The throne of his son secured, Ama Kumba Mbodj was exiled, and he had to seek refuge in Mbodiène. Ama Kumba Mbodj was still living in exile when the French missionaries started arriving in 1848. According to some, the Sandigui N'Diob was the most powerful man in the country and had total control of country.

== Relationship with French missionaries ==
The King had a turbulent relationship with the French missionaries. Joal, one of his provinces has become a source of rumor and campaign against the French missionaries. The Mission in Joal was created without the King giving his permission. When the missionaries arrived, a group of cheddos (animists, could also mean the animist warrior armies as in this case) began demanding alcohol. Through the emissaries of the King, Father Gallais was persuaded to take a trip to Diakhao, the capital of Sine.

In October 1848, after the Chief of Joal decided that the mission chapel should be built of straw rather than wood, Gallais made the first of several trips to Diakhao. When he arrived, the cheddos (the warrior army) were beautifully dressed, and armed with guns and knives. The King and his father (the Sandigui N'Diob) greeted Gallais. After some polite chatter, the King allowed the French to build a small wooden chapel. In December, the King went to Joal mounted on a decorated horse, accompanied by a group of griots and more than a thousand Serer warriors. Gallais was so impressed that he wrote a letter to Father Bessieux in which he said:

"The Serer people are numerous and powerful and well worth your pastoral solicitude."

In 1849, the King granted Gallais the land of Father Aloyse Kobès (a French missionary whom Maad a Sinig Kumba Ndoffene Famak Joof would later threaten to kill if he dare to disobey his orders). Kobès was hoping to use the land for his school and farm until it was revoked by the King. After the granting of land, the mission at Ngazobil was founded in 1850. However, the Serer kings this did not remain this friendly for long.

The Serers of Sine saw the French missionaries as secret agents for the French administration in Senegal and the French government in Paris. This rumor was first circulated by King Ama Joof Gnilane Faye Joof, which was exacerbated by the French gunboats in coastal waters.

The missionaries were forbidden to build in stone. The reason for this was as much religious as political. Construction of a permanent stone chapel in the heart of Sine would be unacceptable to the animist Serers who were fervent adherents of the Serer religion. In the political sense, the King feared that if he allowed the French to build in stone, they could build a fort where they could launch cannons. In this context, the Sandigui N'Diob repeatedly told the French missionaries to settle in Diakhao. He also invited Gallais to live with him as one of his guests. This represented a major opportunity for the Royal Family.

"Shrewd old Sandidhé [Sandigui] has even invited me to come live with him like his Moor and other marabouts..." Gallais wrote.

Diakhao was the capital of Sine, and by inviting the French mission to Diakhao and Gallais as one of his guests, they would be under the control of the Sandigui N'Diob (the most powerful man in the country). King Ama Joof Gnilane Faye Joof and his father (the Sandigui N'Diob) wanted to use the missionaries in the same way they used their marabouts: as secretaries and sources of information (secret agents). Although Gallais was interested at one point in moving the mission to the interior, it was probably Kobès who declined invitation.

Almost from the moment the missionary at Ngazobil was established in early 1850, the French missionaries faced systematic harassment that was designed to force them to leave the country. The people were also forbidden to sell anything to the mission or to send their children to the mission's school. Soon after, the chapel at Ngazobil was looted. From this period onwards, the most crucial factor motivating the policies of the Serer kings was a desire to preserve their independence.

In January 1851, Father Kobès, who had previously visited Gabon, decided to stop in Joal. The emissaries of King Ama Joof Gnilane Faye Joof asked for a lift on his boat. It was only after they arrived at Gorée did Father Kobès realize that one of his fellow passengers was carrying a letter from the King ordering Ngazobil be closed.

"Ramat Dhiouf [Diouf - French spelling in Senegal] is the name of the King; he is young and one of the most handsome Blacks I've seen; a tall, noble and distinguished figure; he is still attached to these benefits outside all the qualities of mind and heart, he speaks admirably up to six different languages. He is loved by his subjects and he loves them. It is regrettable that so many qualities are overshadowed by the vices of kings are those of idolaters, passion for liqueur and especially for women ..."

— David Boilat.

In July 1851, the Sandigui N'Diob died. Gallais went to Sine to offer condolences to the King on the death of his father. Gallais also took the opportunity to persuade the king not to close Ngazobil. He succeeded. However, the systematic harassment of the French started again, and Ngazobil was closed.

== Death of King Ama Joof ==
When the Sandigui N'Diob died in 1851, many expected the return of Ama Kumba Mbodj (uncle of Maad a Sinig Ama Joof Gnilane Faye Joof), but Maad a Sinig Ama Joof Gnilane Faye Joof remained in power until his death in early 1853 and was succeeded by Maad a Sinig Kumba Ndoffene Famak Joof. After the departure of Father Gallais in 1852 and the death of the Sandigui N'Diob and King Ama Joof, there was no meaningful contact between the French missionaries and the Serer kings. On the Petite Côte, only the Joal mission continued, generally tolerated but sometimes harassed.

== See also ==
- Kingdom of Sine
- Serer people
- Serer religion
- Joof family
- Kingdom of Saloum
- Kingdom of Baol

== Notes ==
=== Bibliography ===
- Diouf, Marcel Mahawa, Lances mâles : Léopold Sédar Senghor et les traditions sérères, Centre d'études linguistiques et historiques par tradition orale, Niamey, 1996
- Diouf, Niokhobaye, Chronique du royaume du Sine, suivie de notes sur les traditions orales et les sources écrites concernant le royaume du Sine par Charles Becker et Victor Martin, Bulletin de l'IFAN, tome 34, série B, n° 4, 1972
- Klein, Martin A., Islam and Imperialism in Senegal. Sine-Saloum, 1847–1914, Edinburgh University Press, 1968
- Oliver, Roland; Fage, John Donnelly & Sanderson, G. N. The Cambridge History of Africa, Cambridge University Press, 1985 ISBN 0521228034
- Saint-Martin, Yves-Jean, Le Sénégal sous le Second Empire, Karthala, 1989 ISBN 2865372014
- Sarr, Alioune, Histoire du Sine-Saloum. Introduction, bibliographie et notes par Charles Becker, Bulletin de l'IFAN, tome 46, série B, n° 3–4, 1986–1987

Preceded by Maad a Sinig Njaak Wagam Gnilane Faye	Maad a Sinig c.. 1825–1853	Succeeded by Maad a Sinig Kumba Ndoffene Famak Joof
