= Ndaah Njemeh Joof =

Medieval King of Laah, now in Senegal

Maad Ndaah Njemeh Joof
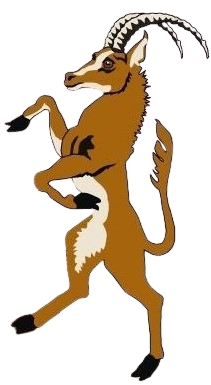
- The totem and symbol of the Joof family is the antelope and gazelle, symbolizing grace, royalty, wisdom, hard work and protection in Serer mythology.

King of Laah in Baol.
- Reign: c. 1290
- Predecessor: Preceded by Lamane Jegan Joof (founder of Tukar in c. 11th century)
- Heir-apparent: He is the ancestor of the Joof royal families Sine, Saloum and Baol; the Joof nobility of Jolof; as well as the Faal royal family of Cayor and Baol. The last absolute monarchs of Sine and Saloum were Maad a Sinig Mahecor Joof and Maad Saloum Fode N'Gouye Joof respectively. They both died in 1969.
- Born: Kingdom of Baol, present-day Senegal
Names
- Maad Ndaah Njemeh Joof (proper : Maad Ndaah Njeeme Juuf)
- Religion: Serer religion

Serer royal and religious titles
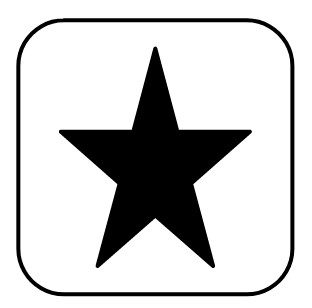
- Royal titles
- Lamane (also religious)
- Maad
- Maad a Sinig
- Maad Saloum
- Teigne
- Lingeer
- Line of succession
- Buumi
- Thilas
- Loul Religious titles
- Saltigue

Maad Ndaah Njemeh Joof (Serer : Maad Ndaah Njeeme Juuf or Mad Ndaah Njeeme Juuf) is one of the patriarchs of the Joof family, himself the medieval King of Laah (or Lâ) in Baol now part of independent Senegal. He ruled from the late 13th century to the early 14th century, c. 1290. His descendants from the branch of Maad Xole Joof (né: Xole Njuug Juuf), king of Paataar, and the conqueror) ruled the pre-colonial Kingdoms of Sine, Saloum and Baol, from the 14th century to 1969. The last king of Sine and Saloum (Maad a Sinig Mahecor Joof and Maad Saloum Fode N'Gouye Joof respectively) died in 1969. After their deaths, the Serer States of Sine and Saloum were incorporated into independent Senegal. His descendants went on to found three royal houses:

- The Royal House of Boureh Gnilane Joof (Serer: Mbind Bure Nilaan, other: Keur Bouré Gnilane) - founded by Jaraff Boureh Gnilane Joof
- The Royal House of Jogo Siga Joof (Serer: Mbind Jogo Siga, other : Keur Diogo Siga) - founded by Maad a Sinig Jogo Gnilane Joof
- The Royal House of Semou Njekeh Joof (Serer: Mbind Sem-Jike, other: Keur Semou Djiké or Keur Semou Ndiké) - founded by Maad Semou Njekeh Joof

Maad Ndaah Njemeh is one of the most significant figures in Serer and Senegambian dynastic history. He stems from the royal line of Lamane Jegan Joof, the 11th century founder and King of Tukar.

Ndaah Njemeh's three notable sons included Niokhori Ndaah Joof, Mangi Ndaah Joof, and Yungari Ndaah Joof. Niokhori Ndaah is the ancestor of the Joof royal family of Sine and Saloum; Mangi Ndaah the ancestor of the Joof notable family of Baol and the Faal royal family of Baol and Cayor which succeeded the Joof dynasty of Baol (Lingeer Sobel Joof, a descendant of Mangi, is the maternal grandmother of Damel Amari Ngoneh Faal, founder of the Faal dynasty); and Yungari Ndaah is the ancestor of the Joof noble family of Jolof. The former President of Senegal, President Abdou Diouf descended from this branch of the Joof family.

== Genealogy ==
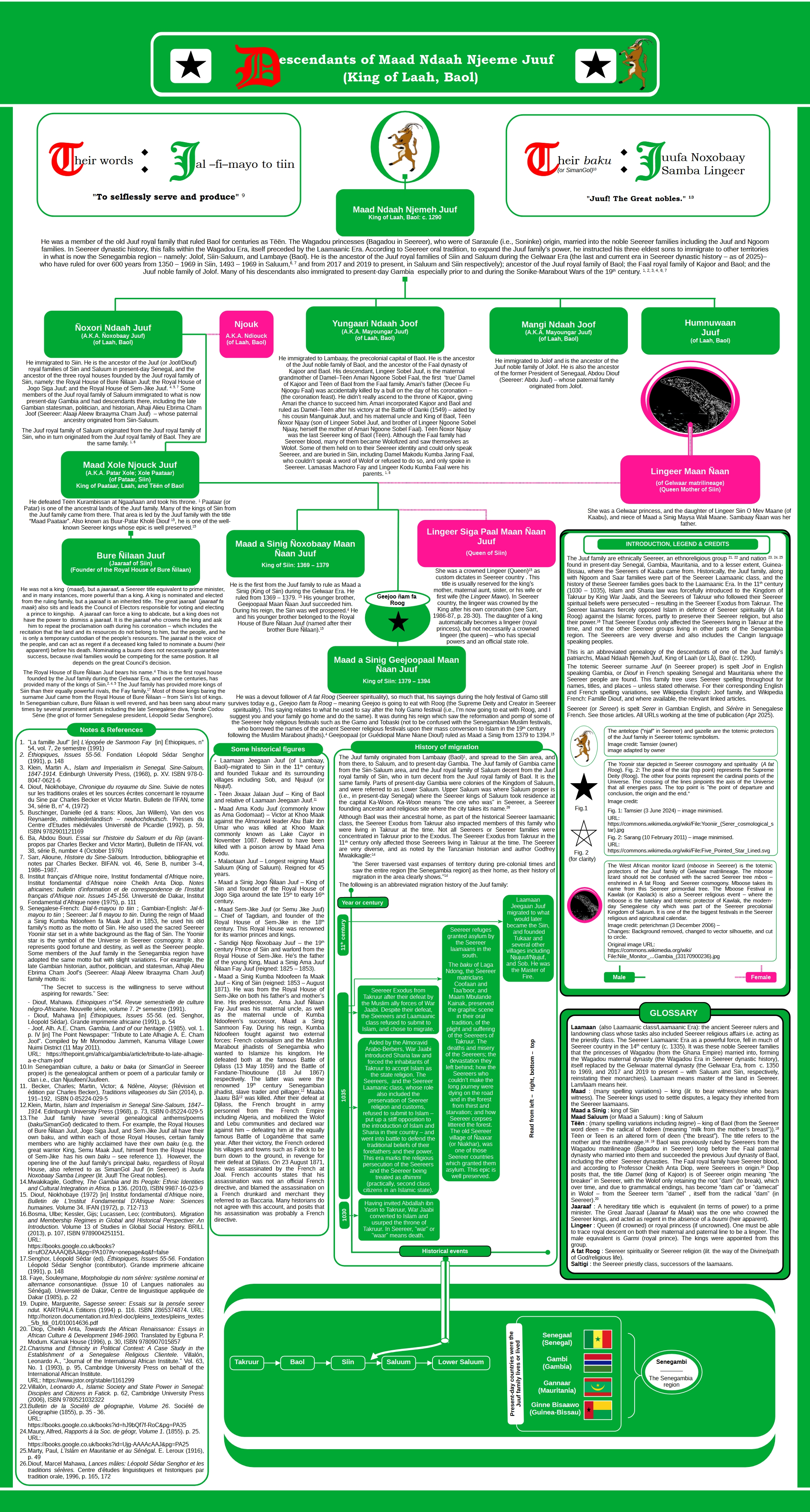
Descendants of Maad Ndaah Njemeh Joof

== See also ==
- Lamane Jegan Joof
- Tukar
- Kingdom of Baol
- Serer people
- Kingdom of Sine
- Kingdom of Saloum
- Joof family
- Boukar Djillakh Faye
- Lamane
- Lingeer Fatim Beye
- Lingeer Ndoye Demba
- Lingeer
- Serer history (medieval era to present)

== Bibliography ==
- "La famille Juuf [in] « L'épopée de Sanmoon Fay », in Éthiopiques, n° 54, vol. 7, 2e semestre 1991
- Éthiopiques, Issues 55-56. Fondation Léopold Sédar Senghor, 1991,
- Diouf, Niokhobaye, « Chronique du royaume du Sine, suivie de notes sur les traditions orales et les sources écrites concernant le royaume du Sine par Charles Becker et Victor Martin », Bulletin de l'IFAN, tome 34, série B, n° 4, 1972
- Klein, Martin A., Islam and Imperialism in Senegal. Sine-Saloum, 1847–1914, Edinburgh University Press, 1968, p. XV
- Buschinger, Danielle (ed & trans: Kloos, Jan Willem), Van den vos Reynaerde: mittelniederländisch - neuhochdeutsch, Presses du Centre d'Etudes médiévales Université de Picardie (1992), p. 59, ISBN 9782901121169
