= The Royal House of Semou Njekeh Joof =

Third and last royal house founded by the Joof family

The Royal House of Semou Njekeh Joof (Mbind Sem-Jike Juuf)
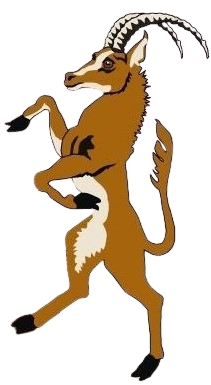
- The antelope and gazelle are the totems of the Joof family, the founders of this royal house. In the mythology of the Serer, it symbolises grace, royalty, wisdom, hardwork and protector.
- Parent house: The Royal House of Boureh Gnilane Joof. Their ancestor is Lamane Jegan Joof (king and founder of Tukar) and Maad Ndaah Njemeh Joof (king of Laa (part of old Baol)).
- Country: Kingdom of Sine (mostly) and Kingdom of Saloum (some). Both Kingdoms now part of present-day Senegal Senegal
- Founded: c. 1717
- Founder: Maad Semou Njekeh Joof
- Final ruler: Maad a Sinig Mahecor Joof (1924 — 1969, as absolute monarch), and Niokhobaye Fatou Diène Diouf (8 February 2019 — present, as constitutional monarch)
- Titles: Maad; Maad a Sinig; Maad Saloum
- Dissolution: 1969 (reinstated on 8 February 2019 — present, when Sine decided to reinstate their monarchy by crowning Niokhobaye Fatou Diène Diouf Maad a Sinig).

The Royal House of Semou Njekeh Joof (Serer : Mbind Sem-Jike, Mbin Semou Njike or Mbind Semu Jike Juuf, other : Keur Semou Djiké) was founded in the early 18th century by Maad Semou Njekeh Joof from the Kingdom of Sine, now part of present-day Senegal. It was the third and last royal house founded by the Joof family – (the Joof dynasty of Sine and Saloum) during the Guelowar period, since the reignes of Maad a Sinig Maysa Wali Jaxateh Manneh and Maad a Sinig Mahecor Joof (1350 and 1969 respectively). From the date of its foundation up to the dissolution of Sine in 1969, at least seven kings from this royal house had succeeded to the throne of Sine.

== List of kings ==
List of kings from the Royal House of Semou Njekeh Joof:

- Maad a Sinig Boukar Tjilas Sanghaie Joof, son of Maad Semou Njekeh Joof and the first from this royal house to rule in Sine. Reigned: c. 1724–1735.
- Maad a Sinig Boukar Tjilas a Mbotil Joof, reigned: c. 1735–1750.
- Maad a Sinig Mbaye Fotlou Juk Joof, reigned : c. 1763 -1770.
- Maad a Sinig Ama Joof Gnilane Faye Joof, the most controversial king from this royal house. Reigned : c.. 1825 – 1853.
- Maad a Sinig Kumba Ndoffene Famak Joof, one of the most famous kings from this royal house. Reigned : 1853 – August 1871.
- Maad a Sinig Semou Maak Joof, physically abused in childhood by his guardian and uncle (Maad a Sinig Sanmoon Faye – king of Sine), he later launched a war against him, defeated him and usurped his throne. In November 1881, he committed suicide by shooting himself in the head with a revolver. Reigned: 1878–1882*.
- Maad a Sinig Amadi Baro Joof, he defeated Maad a Sinig Mbackeh Mak Njie at the Battle of Patar. While playing a board game with his servant at Ndiob, he was surprised by the men of Maad a Sinig Mbackeh Mak and killed. Reigned: 1882–1884.
- Maad a Sinig Mahecor Joof, the last king of Sine. He died in 1969 the same year the last king of Saloum (Maad Saloum Fode N'Gouye Joof) died. Reigned: 1924–1969
- Maad a Sinig Niokhobaye Fatou Diène Diouf (commonly known as Maa Sinig Niokhobaye Diouf Fat Diène or Niokhobaye Fat Diéne Diouf), is the current King of Sine as of 2024. Fifty years after the death of King Mahecor Joof, the Serer people of Sine decided to reinstate their monarchy, and Niokhobaye Fatou Diène Diouf was selected from the eligible princes and crowned Maad a Sinig (King of Sine) on 8 February 2019 at Diakhao, the precolonial capital of Sine. He is a member of the Royal House of Semou Njekeh via the Semou Maak branch (his direct paternal ancestor), and a member of the Guelowar matrilineage through his mother Lingeer Fatou Diène, sister of the late Lingeer Daba Diène. Niokhobaye's first anniversary as Maad a Sinig was celebrated on 8 February 2020, fifty-one years after the death of the last King, Mahecor Joof. Niokhobaye Diouf does not have any official powers since Sine has now been incorporated into independent Senegal, and has a form of constitutional monarchy with very limited powers compared to his predecessors. His role is largely ceremonial and diplomatic. Despite his limited powers, he has great influence in the Senegambia region, and has been able utilise his influence on the President of Senegal, and the old pleasant cousinship between the Serer and Jola people by liaising with the King of Oussouye Maan Sibiloumbaye Diédhiou, to help bring about development in the Senegambia region, and a peaceful end to the Casamance conflict which has plagued the Gambia, Senegal and neighbouring Guinea-Bissau since 1982. The Serer people of Saloum were the first to reinstate their monarchy in 2017, forty-eight years after the death of King Fode N'Gouye Joof. Thierno Coumba Daga Ndao is the current Maad Saloum (King of Saloum as of 2024). He is the maternal uncle of Niokhobaye Diouf, and was crowned Maad Saloum (or Buur Saloum) on Sunday, 21 May 2017 at Kawon, the precolonial capital of Saloum — after a controversial and contentious election against his rival, Guédel Mbodj.

== See also ==
- The Royal House of Boureh Gnilane Joof
- The Royal House of Jogo Siga Joof
- Kingdom of Sine
- Serer people
- Joof family
- Kingdom of Saloum
- Kingdom of Baol
- Joos Maternal Dynasty

== Bibliography ==
- Sarr, Alioune. Histoire du Sine-Saloum (Sénégal). Introduction, bibliographie et notes par Charles Becker. Version légèrement remaniée par rapport à celle qui est parue en 1986–87.
- Diouf, Niokhobaye. Chronique du royaume du Sine. Suivie de notes sur les traditions orales et les sources écrites concernant le royaume du Sine par Charles Becker et Victor Martin. (1972). Bulletin de l'Ifan, Tome 34, Série B, n° 4, (1972).
- Klein, Martin. A. Islam and Imperialism in Senegal Sine-Saloum, 1847–1914. Edinburgh University Press (1968).
- Buschinger, Danielle (ed & trans: Kloos, Jan Willem), Van den vos Reynaerde: mittelniederländisch – neuhochdeutsch, Presses du Centre d'Etudes médiévales Université de Picardie (1992), p. 59, ISBN 9782901121169
