= The Royal House of Jogo Siga Joof =

Second royal house founded by the Joof family during the Guelowar dynastic period of Sine

The Royal House of Jogo Siga Joof (Mbind Jogo Siga Juuf)
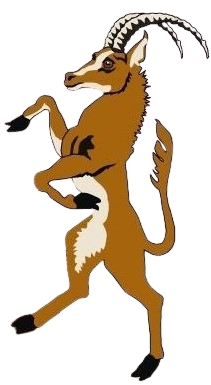
- The antelope and gazelle are the totems of the Joof family, the founders of this royal house. In the mythology of the Serer, it symbolises grace, royalty, wisdom, hardwork and protector.
- Parent house: Descendance of Lamane Jegan Joof (king and founder of Tukar) and Maad Ndaah Njemeh Joof (king of Laa, part of old Baol).
- Country: Kingdom of Sine; Part of present-day Senegal
- Founded: c. 1461
- Founder: Maad a Sinig Jogo Gnilane Joof
- Final ruler: Maad a Sinig Boukar Tjilas Jajel Joof (the last king of Sine from this royal house), Maad a Sinig Mahecor Joof (last king of Sine, died 1969, member of the Royal House of Semou Njekeh Joof).
- Titles: Maad a Sinig
- Dissolution: 1969 - dissolution of Serer monarchies of Sine and Saloum following the deaths of Maad a Sinig Mahecor Joof and Maad Saloum Fode N'Gouye Joof (king of Sine and Saloum respectively).

The Royal House of Jogo Siga Joof (Serer : Mbin Jogo Siga Juuf or Mbind Jogo Siga, other variation : Keur Diogo Siga, etc.) was the second royal house founded by the Joof family during the Guelowar dynastic period of Sine. The Guelowar period commences from c. 1350 during the reign of Maad a Sinig Maysa Wali and ends in 1969 following the deaths of the last Serer kings of Sine and Saloum (Maad a Sinig Mahecor Joof and Maad Saloum Fode N'Gouye Joof respectively) and the disestablishment of the monarchies in Serer countries. The pre-colonial Kingdom of Sine now lies within present-day Senegal.

== History ==
The Royal House of Jogo Siga Joof was founded around the later half of the 15th to early 16th century by the Serer king Maad a Sinig Jogo Gnilane Joof (var : Diogo Gnilane Diouf, following its French spelling in Senegal). Unlike the other royal houses founded by the Joof family of pre-colonial Senegambia, the Royal House of Jogo Siga Joof did not provide many kings. Only two (possibly one) known Serer kings are attested to have belonged to this royal house, including the founder. However, this royal house holds great significance in the survival of the Serer religion particularly in Sine and the independence of Sine, free from Islamisation. Maad a Sinig Jogo Gnilane Joof is reported to have defeated the Muslim marabout - Mamadou Koungo (of Koungheul) and kept the Islamic religion out of Sine. Maad a Sinig Jogo Gnilane's victory against the jihadic expedition of the Muslim marabout was celebrated by depositing the "Eternal Stone of Sine" (called Sirat by some) at Diakhao. The city of Diakhao was where the battle took place. It is also the historical capital of many Serer Maad a Sinigs. The eternal stone is still found in Diakhao, at the same spot it was placed by the king (see also Serer ancient history and Senegambian stone circles).

After the collapse of the Royal House of Jogo Siga Joof, the Joof family founded their third and last royal house - the Royal House of Semou Njekeh Joof, founded by Maad Semou Njekeh Joof.

== List of kings ==
This is a list of Serer kings of Sine reported to have belonged to the Royal House of Jogo Siga Joof. Their royal title is Maad a Sinig (king of Sine). This royal house is the most contentious of all the royal houses founded by the Joof family, as the year of reign varies from one source to the next.

- Maad a Sinig Jogo Gnilane Joof (var : Diogo Gnilane Diouf), founder of this house. There is no consensus as to his exact date of reign. According to Diouf, he reigned from 1443 to 1461. Teixeira da Mota postulates that he reigned in the 16th century (possibly early 16th century)
- Maad a Sinig Boukar Tjilas Jajel Joof (var : Boukar Tjilas Diadiel Diouf or Bukar Cilas Jajel Juf / Juuf, following its pronunciation and spelling in Serer) is one of the most revered kings of Sine. Absolutely security and prosperity (through hardwork) is reported to have prevailed throughout his dominion. In spite of his historical account, the exact date of his reign is a matter of conjecture. Diouf provides a date range of 1698 - 1715, whilst other sources with a degree of uncertainty states that he probably reigned just after 1785.

== Bibliography ==
- Diouf, Niokhobaye, "Chronique du royaume du Sine", Suivie de notes sur les traditions orales et les sources écrites concernant le royaume du Sine par Charles Becker et Victor Martin. (1972). Bulletin de l'Ifan, Tome 34, Série B, n° 4, (1972).
- La famille Juuf [in] « L'épopée de Maad a Sinig SanSanmoon Fay », [in] Éthiopiques, no 54, vol. 7, 2^{e} semestre 1991
- Sarr, Alioune, "Histoire du Sine-Saloum" (Sénégal). Introduction, bibliographie et notes par Charles Becker. Version légèrement remaniée par rapport à celle qui est parue en 1986-87 (extract version) and [in] UCAD Department of History, "extract" Sénégal (Retrieved : 8 July 2012)
- Klein, Martin. A., "Islam and Imperialism in Senegal Sine-Saloum, 1847-1914", Edinburgh University Press (1968), ISBN 0-85224-029-5
- Thilmans, Guy; Descamps, Cyr & Camara, Abdoulaye, "Senegalia : études sur le patrimoine ouest-africain" : hommage à Guy Thilmans, Sépia, 2006, pp 220–221 ISBN 2-84280-122-9
- Sheridan, Michael J., & Nyamweru, Celia, "African sacred groves: ecological dynamics & social change", James Currey, (2008), p. 141 ISBN 0-8214-1789-4
- Institut fondamental d'Afrique noire, "Bulletin de l'Institut fondamental d'Afrique noire: Sciences humaines, Volume 46", IFAN (1985), p 232
- Brigaud, Félix, "Histoire traditionnelle du Sénégal", (1962), pp 265–278 reviewed by Cambridge Journals (Retrieved : 7 July 2012)
- Cite : A. Teixeira da Mota : « Un document nouveau pour l’histoire des Peuls au Sénégal pendant les XVe et XVIe siècles », Boletin Cultural da Guine Portuguesa, XXIV, October 1969, n° 96, tiré à part pp 17–18
