= Joof =

Joof, is a typical Serer patronym in the Gambia. In French-speaking Senegal, it is written as Diouf, whilst in English-speaking Gambia, it is written as Joof. It is the surname of:

- Alhaji Alieu Ebrima Cham Joof (1924 – 2011), Gambian historian, author, politician and advocate for Gambia's independence during the colonial era.
- Alhaji Bai Modi Joof (1933 – 1993), Gambian barrister and defender of free speech and the press, younger brother of Alhaji Alieu Ebrima Cham Joof
- Amie Joof, Gambian lawyer and politician
- Hella Joof (born 1962), Danish actress
- Joseph Henry Joof (born 1960), Gambian lawyer and politician
- Lamane Jegan Joof (c. 11th century), founder and King of Tukar – present-day Senegal.
- Maad a Sinig Ama Joof Gnilane Faye Joof (died 1853), King of Sine (Kingdom of Sine)
- Maad a Sinig Kumba Ndoffene Famak Joof (c. 1810 – 23 August 1871), King Sine
- Maad a Sinig Mahecor Joof (died 1969), King of Sine
- Maad Ndaah Njemeh Joof (c. 13th century), King of Lâ (var: Laa or Laah), in Baol, part of modern-day Senegal.
- Maad Semou Njekeh Joof (18th century), founder of The Royal House of Semou Njekeh Joof
- Tamsier Joof (born 1973), British dancer, choreographer, and businessman
