= Fode N'Gouye Joof =

Last king of Saloum

Serer royal and religious titles
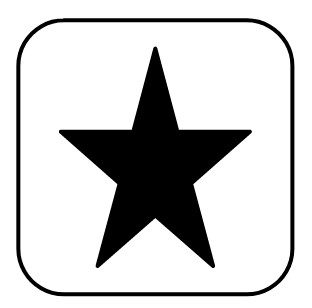
- Royal titles
- Lamane (also religious)
- Maad
- Maad a Sinig
- Maad Saloum
- Teigne
- Lingeer
- Line of succession
- Buumi
- Thilas
- Loul Religious titles
- Saltigue

Maad Saloum Fode N'Gouye Joof (in Gambian English; or Fode Juuf in Serer) was the last king of Saloum. He reigned as Maad Saloum from 1935 to 1969. His royal title Maad Saloum means King of Saloum in Serer.

His residence was at Guinguinéo. Like many of the Serer kings during their medieval dynastic history, Fode was a member of the noble Joof patriclan and the Guelwar matriclan—the two dynastic families who have reigned in Sine and Saloum for centuries. Both his parents were of Guelowar matrilineage. He was a member of the Keway Begay clan. Keway Begay was one of three sisters whose maternal descendants reigned in Saloum for several centuries. Fode was the son of King of Saloum—Ndeneh Jogop Joof (Fr. Ndéné Diogop Diouf) and Lingeer Ngouye Ndour, the Queen of Saloum, later Queen Mother. On his paternal side, he was of the noble Joof family who have reigned in precolonial Senegambia since lamanic times. His father was from Diagnel where Fode was born. On his maternal side, he was from Selik which is the village of the male descendants of the founder of the Guelowar dynasty in Saloum—Maad Saloum Mbegan Ndour (reigned: 1493). Fode was a veteran of World War I, an Officer of the Legion of Honor, and commander of the national order of merit. He was Chief of the cantons of Kolobane, Laghem, Ndoukoumane, Pakala and Mandakh, and eventually Chief of the province of Kahone. He was advisor to independent Senegal. His death in 1969—almost simultaneous with that of Maad a Sinig Mahecor Joof—the last Maad a Sinig (King of Sine), ended the reign of the great and noble Joof and Guelowar dynasties.

== Other spelling ==
1. Fodé N'Gouye Diouf (Senegalese French variation)
2. Fodé Diouf
3. Fodé Ngouye Diouf
4. Fode Ngui Joof (Gambian English spelling variation)

== See also ==
- Maad Ndaah Njemeh Joof
- Serer maternal clans
- Faye family
- Teigne
- Kingdom of Baol

== Bibliography ==
- Ba, Abdou Bouri, Essai sur l’histoire du Saloum et du Rip (avant-propos par Charles Becker et Victor Martin), Bulletin de l'IFAN, tome 38, série B, numéro 4, octobre 1976. pp. 10–11, 14, 27 "Ba Abdou Bouri, Essai sur l'histoire du Saloum et du Rip". Archived from the original on 2013-04-15.
- Klein, Martin A., Islam and Imperialism in Senegal: Sine-Saloum, 1847-1914, Leland Stanford Junior University (Edinburgh University Press) (1968), p. xv, ISBN 9780804706216
- Brigaud, Félix, Histoire du Sénégal: Des origines aux traités de protectorat, Volume 1, Éditions Clairafrique (1964), p. 35, 65-7
- Sarr, Alioune, Histoire du Sine-Saloum (Sénégal). Introduction, bibliographie et notes par Charles Becker. Version légèrement remaniée par rapport à celle qui est parue en 1986–87, p. 233
- Guid'A.O.F.: L'Afrique occidentale française cercle par cercle, Agence de distribution de presse (1953), p. 195
- Seck, Mamadou Falla, Sur les pistes du Bas-Saalum, Centre africain d'animation et d'échanges culturels (1992), p. 104, ISBN 9782878950045
