= Maysa Wali Jaxateh Manneh =

14th century Serer king of Sine (c. 1350 - 1370)

Maad a Sinig Maysa Wali Jaxeteh Manneh
- Reign: 1350–1370
- Coronation: 1350, Crowned Maad a Sinig at Kingdom of Sine, present-day Senegal.
- Predecessor: Preceded by the Serer Lamanic class (Maad used interchangeably with the ancient Serer Lamanes)
- Heir-apparent: Maad a Sinig Tassé Faye, son of Boukar Djillakh Faye of Djillakh (Dieghem)
- Born: Kaabu, present-day Guinea-Bissau
- Consort: Lingeer Fatim Beye
Names
- Maad a Sinig Maysa Wali Jaxeteh Manneh
- Religion: Serer religion

Maad a Sinig Maysa Wali Jaxateh Manneh (Serer proper : Maysa Waali Maane, many variations : Maysa Waaly Dione, Maïssa Wali Dione, Maysa Wali Jon, Maissa Waly Mané, etc.) was a king described in the oral tradition of the Serer pre-colonial Kingdom of Sine and the first of the Guelowar maternal dynasty to rule in Serer country. He reigned as Maad a Sinig (king of Sine) from c. 1350 to 1370.

== History ==
In Serer oral tradition, Maysa Wali was a member of the Guelowar family who had escaped Kaabu with some members of his family after their defeat at the Battle of Troubang (1335) by the powerful Ñaanco maternal dynasty of Kaabu. Oral history describes this as a dynastic war between the two powerful royal houses of Kaabu, the House of Guelowar and the House of Ñaanco. Many members of the Guelowar family were massacred in that battle. After their defeat, those members of the Guelowar who had survived the massacre headed to the Serer pre-colonial Kingdom of Sine where they were granted asylum by the Serer nobility – the Great Council of Lamanes.

In reporting this tradition, Henry Gravrand did not notice that this is actually a description of the 1867 (or 1865) Battle of Kansala although the departure of the Guelowar can probably be explained by a war or a conflict of succession. Whatever the reason, they apparently left Kaabu around 1335.

After serving this council for fifteen years as legal advisor, Maysa Wali gained the trust and confidence of the Council and the Serer people of Sine, and was nominated, elected and crowned king of Sine. As a result of his election, Maysa Wali became the first Guelowar to be appointed Maad a Sinig. His sisters and nieces who had escaped Kaabu with him were given in marriage to the Serer nobility, thereby sealing the union between Serer-Guelowar. As a result of these royal marriages, the old Serer paternal dynasties survived but the Wagadou maternal dynasty (Bagadou in Serer language), collapsed.

The Wagadous were princesses from the Ghana Empire who had married into the Serer royal families i.e. the Joof family, Faye family, Ngom family, etc. After the demise of the Wagadous, they were replaced by the Guelowars. The Serer dynasties survived until 1969 when the last king of Sine and Saloum died.

Although many of the Serer nobility and common people supported the election of Maysa Wali, not every member of the Serer establishment were in support of his election. In this regard, Lamane Pangha Yaya Sarr, according to Serer tradition, stood out as one of the fervent opponent to Maysa Wali's election. According to the tradition, the Lamane viewed Maysa Wali as a foreign prince who did not have a Serer mother or father. In spite of Maysa Wali's long service to the noble Council, assimilation to Serer culture, his adherence to religion with even his own Pangool, Maysa Wali's reign was marred by a small section of Serer society in opposition to his reign.

The name Dione or Jon is even believed by some to be a derogatory reference to his long reign (20 years), used by his successors who were eager for him to abdicate so they could succeed to the throne. The result of that was, the Guelowar women married Serer men and the offspring of these marriages ruled the kingdoms of Sine and Saloum. After Maysa Wali's reign, none of his direct descendants ruled the Serer kingdoms. The children of the Serer men and Guelowar women became Serers with loyalty to the Serer kingdoms, Serer religion, Serer people and culture, and all ties with Kaabu were severed. Other sources also suggests that, Maysa Wali was once married to the Serer princess Lingeer Fatim Beye (of Sine). Lingeer Fatim Beye is the matriarch of the Joos Maternal Dynasty. This Serer dynasty was established in Waalo by her granddaughter Lingeer Ndoye Demba in the later half of the 14th century. Maysa Wali was not the paternal grandfather of Lingeer Ndoye Demba, which suggests Lingeer Fatim Beye's marriage to Maysa Wali was either a first marriage which ended in divorce, or most probably, per Senegambian culture, a second marriage after being made a widow.

== Reign ==
Serer royal and religious titles
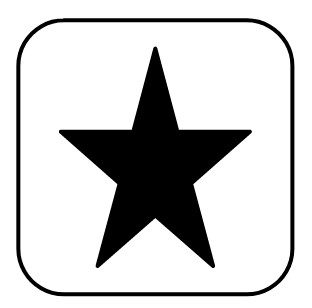
- Royal titles
- Lamane (also religious)
- Maad
- Maad a Sinig
- Maad Saloum
- Teigne
- Lingeer
- Line of succession
- Buumi
- Thilas
- Loul Religious titles
- Saltigue

=== Jolof Empire ===
The Jolof Empire was founded by a voluntary confederacy of States. It was not an empire built on military conquest. Ndiadiane Ndiaye the possibly mythical founder of the Empire is said to have been nominated and elected by Maad a Sining Maysa Wali to rule the Jolof Empire – his contemporary. According to the epics of both Ndiadiane and Maysa Wali, it was Maysa Wali who elected Ndiadiane Ndiaye and called upon all the Senegambian kings to co-operate with Ndiadiane and join the confederacy which they did. That was ten years after Maysa Wali sat on the throne - 1360 (the year of Ndiadiane's reign). Maysa Wali is thus seen as a prominent figure in the formation of the Jolof Empire and the election of Ndiadiane. According to Charles Becker, Victor Martin the Jolof Empire was probably founded in order to repulse the dominant power at the time (the Mali Empire). However, Maysa Wali is also viewed by the Serer establishment as the king who took the Serer Kingdom of Sine to this confederacy, a confederacy though initially voluntary, its disestablishment in 1549 was not.

=== Legacy ===
As the first Guelowar to rule in Serer country, Maysa Wali leaves a mixed legacy among the Serers and some scholars. It was previously believed that, the Guelowars, headed by Maysa Wali, launched a war in Serer country, defeated the Serer people and reduced them to a conquered race. That assumption was challenged in 1972 when Niokhobaye Diouf argued that there is nothing in the Serer oral tradition nor in the Guelowars' that speaks of a military conquest. Others suggest that the Guelowars' arrival in Serer country was probably due to a war or a conflict of succession. The incorporation of the Guelowars into the Serer royal families was based on marriage, not military conquest. The Guelowars were also not pure Mandinkas but a mixture of Mandinka, Bainuk and Jola. After the Mansa-Kaabu Tiramakhan Traore (of Mali) conquered Kaabu, killing the last great Bainuk king – King Kikikor, he and his descendants married into the Bainuk nobility. The Mandinkas also changed their surnames and adopted Bainuk and Jola surnames i.e. Manneh and Sanneh (var : Mané and Sané). These surnames are Jola and Bainuk in origin, not Mandinka. It is from this heritage that the Guelowars of Kaabu came from. Thus, the previously held view that a group of people from the Mandinka race conquered and subjugated the Serers, is generally regarded as unfactual.

From a Serer perspective, Maysa Wali is usually regarded as one of the great kings of Sine who upheld the doctrines of Serer religion, culture and traditions in spite of being a prince from a foreign land. He is also regarded as a fair king who passed judgments on legal cases in accordance with the principles of Serer customary law. During his reign, the Kingdom of Sine was well structured, politically, economically and socially. From a global perspective, when scholars of Serer history write about the history of the Guelowars in Serer country, it is his name which is evoked first before any of his successors. As such, Maad a Sinig Maysa Wali Jaxateh Manneh is synonymous with the word "Guelowar" even though none of his direct descendants succeeded him in Serer country. The Kingdom of Sine was not subjugated by Jolof during his reign nor after him. Serer oral tradition holds that Sine never paid tribute to Jolof but Sylviane Diouf states that "Each vassal kingdom—Walo, Takrur, Kayor, Baol, Sine, Salum, Wuli, and Niani—recognized the hegemony of Jolof and paid tribute."

Preceded by The Lamanic class	Maad a Sinig; 1350–1370	Succeeded by Maad a Sinig Tassé Faye
