= Pap Cheyassin Secka =

Gambian lawyer and politician

- Born: Cheyassin Ousman Secka; June 1942; Gambia Colony and Protectorate
- Died: 29 March 2012 (aged 69); The Gambia
- Education: University (Law)
- Occupation: Barrister at Law
- Known for: Law and politics
- Title: LLB
- Parent(s): Ousman Secka and Neneh Jobarteh
- Relatives: Alieu Ebrima Cham Joof and Bai Modi Joof (uncles)

Pap Cheyassin Secka or Pap Cheyassin Ousman Secka (June 1942 – 29 March 2012) was a Gambian lawyer and politician. He was the minister of justice and the former Attorney General of the Gambia.

== Life ==
Pap Cheyassin Secka, more commonly known as Cheyassin Secka was born in the Gambia Colony and Protectorate in June 1942 by Ousman Secka and Neneh Jobarteh. His children include Oumie Secka and Ndondy Secka. He is the maternal nephew of the Gambian historian and politician Alhaji Alieu Ebrima Cham Joof. He was educated at the Methodist Boy's High School in colonial Bathurst now Banjul (the capital of the Gambia). By 1962, he became a qualified teacher and taught in the Gambia for many years before pursuing his education in the United States. He attended the Hall Academy in New Jersey in 1964 before proceeding to the American University in Washing D.C. where he obtained a BA in 1968 and an MA in 1969. It was in the United States where he first became active in politics, as one of the radical political students. Having obtained a fellowship at Columbia University in 1970–71, he was called to the English Bar in 1973. Cheyassin Secka returned to the Gambia in 1973 to set up his law practice.

== Career ==
During the administration of president Sir Dawda Kairaba Jawara (the First Republic), Cheyassin Secka became the leader of the defunct National Liberation Party formed on 4 October 1975. However his political career was marred by the country's 1981 coup d'état instigated by the revolutionist Kukoi Samba Sanyang. According to sources, "he was sentenced to life imprisonment for his alleged participation into the Koukoi [Kukoi] coup attempt against Jawara's regime." Having spent nearly 12 years in prison at Mile Two (the country's top prison), he was later granted amnesty.

Cheyassin Secka became the Gambian Attorney General around 2000, appointed by the Gambian president Yahya Jammeh. On 10 and 11 April 2000, Gambian students held a demonstration against the regime of president Jammeh. In this demonstration, many student were massacred by the Gambian forces. President Jammeh was accused of giving the order to open arms against the students, although he denied the accusation. Following this massacre, Cheyassin Secka "read out the April 10 Commission Report, which indemnifies the April 10 student killers to the local press." After reading out this report, he was relieved from his post by president Jammeh on 30 January 2001, following "the indemnification of the student killers". He was a barrister at law and one of the renowned barristers of the country. He joined the legal profession in 1973 as a practicing barrister. He was a member of the Gambian Bar.

== Death ==
Pap Cheyassin Secka died on 29 March 2012 in the Gambia. According to sources, he is reported to have complained about a "minor illness" and was taken to hospital. He later died having suffered a heart attack.

Government offices
| Preceded by Fatou Bensouda | Attorney General and Minister of Justice of The Gambia; 2000–2001 | Succeeded by Joseph Henry Joof |
