= Ngazobil =

Ngazobil Ngasobil
- Village
- Location within Senegal
- Coordinates: 14°12′0″N 16°52′0″W
- Country: Senegal
- Region: Thiès
- Department: M'bour
- Elevation: 13 m (43 ft)

Ngazobil (also called Ngasobil) is a village in Senegal, located on the Petite Côte, south of Dakar.

== History ==
Since the 19th century, Ngazobil has housed a Catholic mission, one of the oldest in Senegal, established by François Libermann of Saverne, founder of the Congregation of The Holy Spirit.

Louis-Philippe Walter stayed there in 1867.

It was also in Ngazobil that future president Léopold Sédar Senghor did his schooling until 1922.

Hyacinthe Thiandoum was trained there as well.

Saint-Joseph Seminary was classified as a historical monument in 2003.

Ngazobil is now a common site for pilgrimages.

== Administration ==
Ngazobil is located in M'bour, Thiès.

== Geography ==
The nearest towns are Pointe-Sarène, Ponto, Mbodiène, Joal-Fadiouth, Palmarin, and Djifer.

The scenery of the village includes a limestone cliff, a sandy beach, and a 500-hectare forest park. The park shelters many animals, including guineafowl, partridges, boas, monitor lizards, monkeys, hedgehogs, porcupines, jackals, and hares.

The Catholic mission itself owns a beach lined with coconut palm trees where some come to fish.

== Bibliography ==
- R. P. Cailleau (December 1961). "N'Gazobil au fil de l'histoire". Horizons Africains (in French) (134): 7–10.
- Horizons Africains (in French) (155): 15. November 1963.
- Horizons Africains (in French) (157): 8–9. January 1964.
- Horizons Africains (in French) (158): 16. February 1964.
- Horizons Africains (in French) (160): 14–15. April 1964.
- Horizons Africains (in French) (161): 8–11. May 1964.
