= Semou Njekeh Joof =

Member of the Joof family dynasty of the Kingdom of Sine

Maad Semou Njekeh Joof (Maad Semu Jike Juuf)
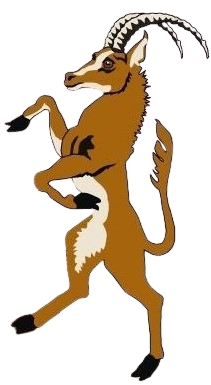
- The totem and symbol of the Joof family is the antelope and gazelle, symbolizing grace, royalty, wisdom, hard work and protection in Serer mythology.
- Reign: Chief of Tagdiam, (Kingdom of Sine)
- Born: Kingdom of Sine (present-day Senegal)
- Consort: Linguere-Awo Yandeh Mbouna Faye
- Issue: Maha Yandeh Mbouna Joof (prince of Sine and Buumi), Jogo Gnilane Mbouna Joof (prince of Sine and thilas), Biram Pateh Yandeh Mbouna Joof (prince of Sine and loul, Maad a Sinig Boukar Tjilas Sanghaie Joof (king of Sine).
Names
- Maad Semou Njekeh Joof
- House: Founder of The Royal House of Semou Njekeh Joof in the 18th century
- Religion: Serer religion

Maad Semou Njekeh Joof (Serer: Maad Sem-Jike Juuf or Semu Jike Juuf) was a member of the Joof Dynasty of Sine now part of independent Senegal. Maad means king (or chief) and Maad a Sinig means king of Sine in Serer. He was the founder of the Royal House of Semou Njekeh Joof, founded in the early eighteenth century. His royal house was the third and last royal house founded by the Joof family of Sine and Saloum. Since its foundation, at least seven kings of Sine from his royal house had succeeded to the throne including his son Maad a Sinig Boukar Tjilas Sanghaie Joof.

== Family ==
Semou Njekeh Joof is reported to have had at least thirty-five children including sixteen sons. Although some of his sons were eligible to succeed to the throne of Sine, many died before succeeding to the throne and some of them died in childhood. Some of his children included the buumi - Maha Yandeh Mbouna Joof (variation: Mahawa Yandé Mbouna Diouf), whom according to some was the father of Boucar O ngoni (variation: Boucary Ngoneh Joof - the Serer prince and advisor to the King of Sine - Maad a Sinig Kumba Ndoffene Famak Joof and killed at the surprise attack of Mbon o NGOOR variation: Mbin o Ngor which spearheaded The Battle of Fandane-Thiouthioune in July 1867); the thilas - Jogo Gnilane Mbouna Joof and the Loul - Biram Pateh Yandeh Mbouna Joof. They were all children of Semou Njekeh and his first wife (the Linguere-Awo) Yandeh Mbouna Faye daughter of Maad a Sinig Wagane Kumba Sandiane Faye. His youngest son with Yandeh Mbouna Faye (Princess of Sine, later Queen Mother) - was Maad a Sinig Boukar Tjilas Sanghaie Joof, the first from his royal house to succeed the throne of Sine. Most of the kings of Sine in the 19th century came from The Royal House of Semou Njekeh Joof including the last king of Sine Maad a Sinig Mahecor Joof.

== Status in religion ==
In the Serer religion, Semou Njekeh Joof is immortalized in the cult of Tagdiam. The principle shrine of Tagdiam is named after him. Tagdiam in present-day Senegal was where he lived.

== See also ==
- Serer people
- Kingdom of Sine
- Joof family
- The Royal House of Boureh Gnilane Joof
- The Royal House of Jogo Siga Joof
