= Dame Diouf =

Senegalese retired footballer

Personal information
- Date of birth: 31 March 1978 (age 48)
- Place of birth: Dakar, Senegal
- Height: 1.88 m (6 ft 2 in)
- Position: Defender

Youth career
- Gorée
- Modèle Lomé
- Rennes

Senior career*
| Years | Team | Apps | (Gls) |
| 1996–1999 | FC Homburg | | |
| 1999–2000 | SV Wilhelmshaven | | |
| 2000–2001 | Werder Bremen II | 14 | (0) |
| 2001–2003 | Hannover 96 | 32 | (5) |
| 2004 | → VfL Osnabrück (loan) | 6 | (1) |
| 2004–2005 | Hannover 96 | 0 | (0) |
| 2005–2006 | SV Wehen | 4 | (0) |
| 2006–2007 | VfB Hüls | 3 | (0) |
| 2007 | Arminia Hannover | 14 | (2) |
| 2007–2008 | Holstein Kiel | 3 | (0) |
| 2008 | SV Meppen | 18 | (1) |
| 2009 | Jahn Regensburg II | | |
| 2009–2011 | FC Kempten | | |
| 2011–2012 | FC Isny | | |
| 2012–2013 | SV Cambodunum | | |
- * Club domestic league appearances and goals

Dame Diouf (born 31 March 1978) is a Senegalese retired professional footballer, who aside from three seasons with Hannover 96, spent his entire career in the lower leagues of German football.

== Career ==
He spent three seasons in the Bundesliga with Hannover 96.

== Personal life ==
He is the older brother of El Hadji Diouf.
