= Mahecor Joof =

Last king of the Serer Kingdom of Sine

Maad a Sinig Mahecor Joof
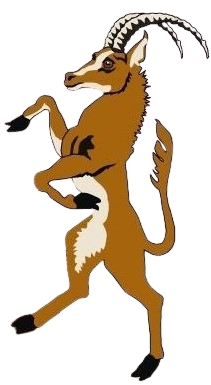
- The totem and symbol of the Joof family is the antelope and gazelle, symbolizing grace, royalty, wisdom, hard work and protection in Serer mythology.

King of Sine
- Reign: 1924–1969
- Coronation: 28 January 1924
- Predecessor: Maad a Sinig Kumba Ndoffene Fa Ndeb Joof
- Successor: Monarchy abolished
- Born: Kingdom of Sine, present-day Senegal
Names
- Maad a Sinig Mahecor Joof
- House: The Royal House of Semou Njekeh Joof, founded by Maad Semou Njekeh Joof.
- Religion: Serer religion

Serer royal and religious titles
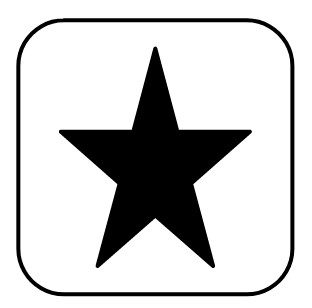
- Royal titles
- Lamane (also religious)
- Maad
- Maad a Sinig
- Maad Saloum
- Teigne
- Lingeer
- Line of succession
- Buumi
- Thilas
- Loul Religious titles
- Saltigue

Maad a Sinig Mahecor Joof (English spelling in the Gambia; variations: Maad a Sinig Mahécor Diouf - French in Senegal; Maad Siin or Mad a Sinig Mahekor Juuf, also Maye Koor Juuf - in Serer) was the last king to rule the Serer Kingdom of Sine, now part of independent Senegal. Maad a Sinig means king of Sine in the Serer language. He reigned from 1924 until his death in 1969 (3 August 1969, he died at Diakhao). After his death, the Kingdom of Sine was incorporated into independent Senegal.

== Royal House ==
Maad a Sinig Mahecor Joof came from the Joof paternal dynasty of Sine and Saloum, from The Royal House of Semou Njekeh Joof (the third and last royal house founded by the Joof family of Sine-Saloum, founded in the 18th century by Maad Semou Njekeh Joof). He was a member of the Guelowar dynasty on his maternal line.

== Legacy ==
By 1969, Maad Mahecor Joof although retired, was the only ruler in Senegal who possessed real power. The Serer kingdoms such as Sine and Saloum were the only pre-colonial kingdoms to survive up to 1969 (six years after Senegal gained independence from France). The Maad a Sinig (King of Sine) was very committed in the preservation of Serer culture and tradition. During his reign, the Kingdom of Sine was economically prosperous. Indebtedness and migration was rarer in Sine than it was elsewhere in the Senegambia. He performed the traditional role of the Maad a Sinig, presiding over the religious affairs of his subjects and became the focal point of the Sine-Sine (inhabitants of Sine).

In one of his last ever state addresses to his subjects regarding the oral history of Sine, he stated:

I, Mahecor Diouf, am the bearer of traditions of Sine and the heir of Maissa Waly Dione.

— Maad a Sinig Mahecor Joof

== See also ==
- Kingdom of Sine
- Serer people
- Kingdom of Saloum
- Kingdom of Baol

== Notes ==
=== Bibliography ===
- Diouf, Niokhobaye. "Chronique du royaume du Sine." Suivie de notes sur les traditions orales et les sources écrites concernant le royaume du Sine par Charles Becker et Victor Martin. (1972). Bulletin de l'Ifan, Tome 34, Série B, n° 4, (1972)
- Sarr, Alioune: " Histoire du Sine-Saloum (Sénégal). Introduction, bibliographie et notes par Charles Becker. Version légèrement remaniée par rapport à celle qui est parue en 1986-87"
- Villalón, Leonardo Alfonso. Islamic society and state power in Senegal: disciples and citizens in Fatick. Cambridge University Press, 1995. ISBN 0-521-46007-7
- Klein, Martin A. "Islam and Imperialism in Senegal Sine-Saloum, 1847-1914." Edinburgh University Press (1968)
- Faye, Louis Diène. Mort et Naissance le monde Sereer. Les Nouvelles Editions Africaines, 1983. ISBN 2-7236-0868-9. p 59

Preceded by Maad a Sinig Kumba Ndoffene Fa Ndeb Joof	Maad a Sinig; 1924–1969	Succeeded by None
