= Saltigue =

Title for Serer high priests and priestesses

Serer royal and religious titles
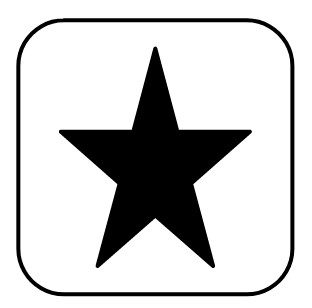
- Royal titles
- Lamane (also religious)
- Maad
- Maad a Sinig
- Maad Saloum
- Teigne
- Lingeer
- Line of succession
- Buumi
- Thilas
- Loul Religious titles
- Saltigue

The Saltigue (other spelling: Saltigué, Saltigui or Saltigi in Serer), are Serer high priests and priestesses who preside over the religious ceremonies and affairs of the Serer people, such as the Xooy (or Xoy) ceremony, the biggest event in the Serer religious calendar. They usually come from ancient Serer paternal families, and the title is inherited by birthright. In Serer country, Saltigue are always diviners.

== Etymology ==
In Serer, Saltigue and its spelling variations derive from two Serer words: "sal" and "tigui"; sal means "meeting point of two ways, place where one branch branches into two other branches. And by analogy, beam on which the roof of the hut rests." Tigui means "resting the roof of the hut." The combination of these two terms gave its name to "saltigue" (a metaphor). The term is also reported to be of Serer origin meaning "soothsayer". In Serer society, the term is reserved for those who communicate with the invisible world.

In Mande, the term "Silatigi" is used, which according to Oumar Kane derives from the Mande term "sili" meaning road, and "tigi" meaning master or leader. Thus, in Mande, the "silatigi" is the one who leads the community in following the right path, physical or spiritual. The Fall claims that the Fula borrowed the term from the Mande. Massing claim that, the Serer religious title Saltigue or Saltigi is etymologically linked to the Mande title Silatigi, whose usage he claim spread extensively across West Africa, including in Sine-Saloum.

In Serer society, the Saltigi/saltigue are the heirs of the ancient Serer lamanes. UNESCO, who have inscribed the annual Xooy religious ceremony into its List of Intangible Cultural Heritage of Humanity since 2013, a Serer religious ceremony which is presided over by the Saltigues, describes the Serer Saltigues as "master seers" and writes that:

"The Saltigues are the living mediums of the Xooy and preserve and transmit the esoteric knowledge that is vital to the ceremony. They are also in charge of interceding between people, the Supreme Being, nature and genies, regulating society, and ensuring harmony between men, women and their environment."

Amongst the Serer Palor people (a subgroup of the Serer), the term "Sili" or "Sili-Sili" is the name for their language, Palor, which is one of the Serer Cangin languages. In their language, "Sili" mean Serer.

== Role of Saltigues in Serer society ==
The Saltigues were responsible for predicting the future of kings, the weather, any natural disaster or political catastrophe that could befall the country, etc. As such, they were frequently consulted by the Serer kings (the Maad, Maad a Sinig, and Maad Saloum, and previously, the Teigne) preferably at the beginning of the rainy season.

Before a king launched a war, he would consult the great assembly of Saltigues to predict the outcome of the battle.

The assembly of Saltigues would predict the outcome, offer precautionary advice on when to launch the attack, the route to take to the battlefield and the animals to be sacrificed, etc. The role of Saltigue was not political. They were not government ministers or politicians, but spiritual advisors and elders. They are the Serer "hereditary rain priests" – guardians of the Serer religion and customs, a birthright they inherited from their ancient Serer Lamanic ancestors.

=== Raan Festival ===
In the precolonial period, during the Raan Festival which takes place in Tukar annually on the second Thursday after the onset of the new moon in April, the kings (during the Guelowar period, 1350-1969, and 2019―present) attended the Festival, making their way from the capital of Diakhao. The king was extremely careful never to arrive before the Lamane and always avoided direct encounters with the Lamane of Tukar. Whilst the Lamane was busy meditating, touring Tukar and making offerings to the pangool, Lunguñ Joof (pangool of the founder of Tukar, and ancestor of the Joof family, Lamane Jegan Joof), the Chief Saltigue and his associates drink sum-sum alcohol all morning before the Festival. It is reported that drinking sum-sum improves the Saltigue's vision of the future and the supernatural world. Having prepared himself sufficiently, the Saltigue and his close associates leave the house and mount their horses, then start their own tour of some of the sacred places of the country. The Saltigué's tour is programmed to follow the king, but ultimately to cross his path at a location known as "Nenem". In this location, the king, aware that the Saltigue is coming, stops the royal entourage. The king and the royal entourage must wait for the Saltigue and his companions to pass. After these high priests and priestesses have passed, the king then gives the signal to the royal entourage to pass as they proceed to their next destination. This is the kind of respect that is afforded to the Saltigue. The Raan Festival is precided over by the Joof family, descendants of Lamane Jegan Joof.

=== Some notable Serer Saltigues ===
(Pre and post independent Senegal)

- Maye Diatt, Sine-Saloum, independent Senegal (post 1960). Member of the MALANGO Centre (an organisation that works with Serer saltigues).
- Khane Diouf, Sine-Saloum, independent Senegal. One of the most revered Saltigues of her generation (as at 2011)
- Laba Diène Ngom, one of the best known Saltigues from Siin, during the reign of Maad a Sinig Kumba Ndoffene fa Maak Joof (1853 - 1871). He was amongst the great Saltigues of Sine brought in to divine the possible outcome of the Battle of Fandane-Thiouthioune prior to the battle in 1867.
- Ndar Ngom, Sine-Saloum, independent Senegal. Head Saltigue of MALANGO Centre (as at 2011).
- Biram NJaay, of Poxaam, Kingdom of Sine, during the reign of Maad a Sinig Mahecor Joof (1924-1969), (June 1969 : active in the Xooy ceremony of Njaanjaay (Ndiaye-ndiaye) at Fatick
- Kotaan NJaay, healer.
- Biram Pouye, of Diobass (16 September 1940 - 9 Feb 2019), a member of the Serer Saafi ethnic group.
- Lat Mosu Saar, - Kingdom of Sine. Grandfather of Njoogu Yaasiin Saar
- Maalick Saar, ancestor of Njoogu Yaasiin Saar
- Mbissin Saar, of Sine-Saloum, Senegal, 26 July 1975 at the Nbuj-naaxar
- NJoogu Yaasiin Saar, the great Saltigue of Sine-Saloum, Senegal. 1975 : active in the Xooy ceremony of NGalan at Mbeel-Bure. Guardian of Mbeel-Bure at Ngalan-koƃ
- Wassaly Sene, Kingdom of Sine, during the reign of Maad a Sinig Kumba Ndoffene fa Maak Joof (1853 - 1871) (as Jaraaf)

== See also ==
- Serer religion
- Roog
- Serer creation myth
- Serer people
- Serer ancient history
- States headed by Serer Lamanes
- Hogon
- Silatigi

== Notes ==
=== Bibliography ===
- Sarr, Alioune (1986). "Histoire du Sine-Saloum. (Introduction, bibliographie et notes par Charles Becker)". Bulletin de l'IFAN (in French). 46 B (3–4).
- Catholic Church. Archdiocese of Kinshasa (Zaire), Aide inter-monastères, Catholic Church. "Vie monastique et inculturation à la lumière des traditions et situations africaines: actes du colloque international ," Kinshasa, 19-25 février 1989, Archdiocese of Kinshasa (Congo), Archidiocèse de Kinshasa (1989), p. 121
- Centre d'étude des civilisations, "Cahiers du mythe." Issues 4-5, Nouvelles éditions africaines. (1978), p. 21
- Gravrand, Henri, "La Civilisation Seereer: Pangool." Les Nouvelles Edition Africaines du Senegal (1990). ISBN 2-7236-1055-1
- Kalis, Simone, "Medecine Traditionnele Religion et Divination Chez Les Seereer Siin du Senegal", L'Harmattan (1997), pp 11–297, ISBN 2-7384-5196-9
- Kane, Oumar (2021). "La Formation du Royaume Jaalalo du Kingi par Tenghella". In Fall, Mamadou; Fall, Rokhaya; Mane, Mamadou (eds.). Bipolarisation du Senegal du XVIe - XVIIe siecle (in French). Dakar: HGS Editions. p. 44-5.
- Ouvrier, Ashley, "Faire de la recherche médicale en Afrique: Ethnographie d'un village-laboratoire sénégalais." Médecines du monde (Contributors: Wenzel Geissler, Anne-Marie Moulin). KARTHALA Editions (2014), p. 200, ISBN 9782811111199
- Fall, Mamadou (2021). "Les Terroirs Historiques et la Poussée Soninké". In Fall, Mamadou; Fall, Rokhaya; Mane, Mamadou (eds.). Bipolarisation du Senegal du XVIe - XVIIe siécle (in French). Dakar: HGS Editions. pp. 18, 22.
- Paul, Lewis M., ed. (2009). "Paloor". Ethnologue: Languages of the World (16th ed.). Dallas, Texas: SIL International.
- Williams, Gordon (1994). "Intelligibility and language boundaries among the Cangin peoples of Senegal." (PDF). Journal of West African Languages. 24 (1): 47–67.
- Ndiaye, Ousmane Sémou, "Diversité et unicité sérères: l'exemple de la région de Thiès." Éthiopiques (1991). 7 (54).
- Diouf, Mahawa, "L'information Historique: L'exemple du Siin." Ethiopiques n°54 revue semestrielle de culture négro-africaine. Nouvelle série volume 7 2e semestre (1991)
- Diouf, Niokhobaye, "Chronique du Royaume du Sine,." IFAN, commenté par Charles Becker & Victor Martin (1972)
- Klein, Martin A., "Islam and Imperialism in Senegal Sine-Saloum, 1847–1914." Edinburgh University Press (1968), p. 91
- Galvan, Dennis Charles, "The State Must Be Our Master of Fire: How Peasants Craft Culturally Sustainable Development in Senegal." Berkeley, University of California Press ( 2004). pp 202–204
- Faye, Diène Faye, Mort et Naissance le monde Sereer. Les Nouvelles Editions Africaines, 1983, pp. 59–61 ISBN 2-7236-0868-9
