= Gambian English =

Variety of English spoken in The Gambia

Gambian English is the variety of English spoken in The Gambia. Gambian English has fewer speakers than any other variety of West African English (WAE), and shares similarities with Sierra Leonean English. The differences between Gambian English and other dialects of African English are mostly lexical and phonological. Gambian English has been influenced by various indigenous Gambian languages.

== See also ==
- Commonwealth English
