= Lamane Jegan Joof =

Serer leader of Tukar, now in Senegal

Lamane Jegan Joof (Laamaan Jeegaan Jaay Juuf)
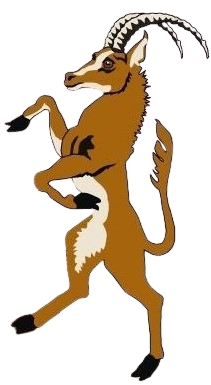
- The totem and symbol of the Joof family is the antelope and gazelle, symbolizing grace, royalty, wisdom, hard work and protection in Serer mythology.

Founder and first Lamane of Tukar.
- Successor: Succeeded by his son Sosseh Joof. The last known Lamane of Tukar was Lamane Diaga Dibor Ndofene Diouf (2004)
- Born: Lambaye (Baol), present-day Senegal
Names
- Lamane Jegan Jaay Joof
- House: Ancestor of the Joof family of Sine and Saloum whose descendants founded the Royal Houses of Boureh Gnilane, Jogo Siga and Semou Njekeh.
- Religion: Serer religion

Lamane Jegan Joof (Serer: Laamaan Jeegaan Jaay Juuf, also Ndigan Dieye Diouf,) was a Serer lamane who according to Serer tradition founded the Serer village of Tukar now part of present-day Senegal. The Raan Festival (a major event in the Serer religious calendar) takes place each year at Tukar, two weeks after the appearance of the new moon in April.

== Origins ==
According to the oral tradition of the Serer people, Jegan Joof migrated from Lambaye following a dispute with his relative, the king of Lambaye–Baol Teign Jinaax Jalaan Joof (or Teeñ Jinaax Jalaan Juuf). The dispute was about the governance of Lambaye and over-taxation. Jegan Joof who was also a mix-farmer and with a large cattle herd felt he was being overtaxed unjustly. He thus decided to migrate with his younger brother Ndik Joof in search of new land and territory to exploit, hence the founding of Tukar, presently, a rather large village which includes numerous other villages such as Njujuf, Ndokh, Sob, etc. They were former colonies of Tukar and part of Jegan's estate. The Joof family reigned in Tukar for several centuries, inherited from their ancestor Lamane Jegan Joof. In the epic of Jegan Joof, he is reported to have had a son called Sosseh Joof (variation : Socé Diouf) who inherited his father's estate. Ndik Joof, brother of Jegan, is reported to have died in Tukar before Jegan's own death. Jegan Joof belongs to the Patik matriclan—one of the many Serer maternal clans.

== Land pawning ==
In 1937, a descendant of Jegan Joof called Biram Diouf pawned his family's estate to the Sene noble family of Sine. It took his descendants 50 years to pay off the debt and regained their family estate.

== Status in religion ==
In the Serer religion, the Raan Festival takes place once a year in Tukar, on the second Thursday after the new moon in April. In this festival, the Serer high priests and priestesses known as the Saltigues make offering of millets and wine to the shrine of Saint Luguuñ Joof. This Holy Saint (or Pangool in Serer) is said to have guided Lamane Jegan Joof when he migrated from Lambaye in search of new land to exploit.

== See also ==
- Serer people
- Joof family
- Lamane
- Kingdom of Baol
- Kingdom of Sine
- Kingdom of Saloum
- States headed by ancient Serer Lamanes
