= Joseph Henry Joof =

Gambian lawyer, politician, and writer

Joseph Henry Joof (born 25 October 1960) is a Gambian lawyer, politician, and writer. He attended Keele University from 1981 to 1985. From 1998 to 2001, he served as president of the Gambia Bar Association, and later as Attorney General and Minister of Justice of the Gambia from 2001 to 2003.

Government offices
Preceded by Pap Cheyassin Secka	Attorney General and Minister of Justice of The Gambia; 2001–2003	Succeeded by Sheikh Tijan Hydara
