= Diouf =

Diouf (French spelling in Senegal) or "Joof" (English spelling in The Gambia) is a Serer surname. Notable people with the name include:

- Abdou Diouf (born 1935), second president of Senegal, former Secretary-General of La Francophonie
- El Hadji Diouf (born 1981), Senegalese footballer
- El Hadji Malick Diouf (born 2004), Senegalese footballer
- Ibra Diouf, member of the Pan-African Parliament
- Jacques Diouf (1938–2019), Senegalese politician, Director-General Food and Agriculture Organization of the United Nations
- Madior Diouf (1939–2025), Senegalese politician
- Mamadou Diouf (historian), Senegalese historian, professor at Columbia University
- Mame Biram Diouf (born 1987), Senegalese footballer
- Mame Tacko Diouf (born 1976), Senegalese hurdler
- Mouss Diouf (born 1964), French actor
- Ngalandou Diouf (1875–1941), Senegalese politician, first African elected official since the beginning of colonization
- Ndella Paye Diouf (born c. 1974), Senegal-born French Afro-feminist
- Oumar Diouf (born 2003), Senegalese footballer
- Papa Alioune Diouf (born 1989), Senegalese footballer
- Pape Diouf (1951–2020), President of Olympiques de Marseille
- Pape Paté Diouf (born 1986), Senegalese footballer
- Sylviane Diouf, French historian and writer
- Valentina Diouf (born 1993), Italian volleyball player
- Yehvann Diouf (born 1999), Senegalese footballer
