= Alioune Sarr =

Senegalese historian

- Born: September 1, 1908; Foundiougne, Senegal
- Died: July 12, 2001 (aged 92); Kaolack, Senegal
- Occupations: Historian, author, politician, (president of the regional assembly of sine-saloum)
- Known for: History
- Notable work: Histoire du Sine-Saloum

Alioune Sarr (September 1, 1908 – July 12, 2001) was a Senegalese historian, author and politician whose family gained prominence in the Serer precolonial Kingdom of Sine and Saloum around the 14th century. They also made up the "sulbalƃe" class of Futa Toro (all in present-day Senegal). Sarr was born at Foundiougne. His father (Koly Samba Sarr) was a former Chief of Foundiougne, Gandoune, former head of the constituency of Ndiaye-Ndiaye and former prime minister of Diognick in Senegal. Although Sarr was a prominent politician like his father during the colonial era, he is best known as a historian and author especially after his famous work Histoire du Sine-Saloum which was officially published in 1949 and peer reviewed by historians.

== Politics ==
In 1963, Sarr was President of the Regional Assembly of Sine-Saloum, (Kaolack, Senegal) (French: Président de l’Assemblée Régionale du Sine-Saloum), a position he occupied when the historian Martin A. Klein was carrying out a primary research in 1964 for his book "Islam and Imperialism Senegal, Sine-Saloum, 1847–1914" During his presidency, Sarr received prominent African leaders such as président Sékou Touré when he visited Kaolack.

== Academia ==
Sarr authored and contributed to several books and manuscripts about the history of the Serer people and the Serer Kingdoms of Sine and Saloum.

Some of Sarr's work include:

- Alioune Sarr. "Histoire du Sine-Saloum", Présence Africaine, No. 5, 1949
- Alioune Sarr. "Histoire du Sine-Saloum (Senegal), 1985
- Les Guélvars. Origines. Legendaires. Essai sur l'histoire du Sine-Saloum. Paris-Dakar. (June 23, 1937, September 15, 1937, May 19, 1938)

=== Histoire du Sine-Saloum ===
Alioune Sarr's "Histoire du Sine-Saloum" was originally a manuscript which was developed around 1930. A document which took him several years of research. It detailed the ancient history of the Serer kingdoms of Sine and Saloum, their constituent villages, provinces and founders (including lower Saloum – modern day Gambia, a former colony of the Kingdom of Saloum); the Serer kings; Serer culture; the coronation process of the kings; the Guelowar maternal dynasty; the Serer paternal dynasties and the royal house; the wars (religious and economic) that affected the Kingdoms of Sine and Saloum; etc.

An extract was published in 1948 to assess the value of the document. The future president of Senegal Léopold Sédar Senghor persuaded Sarr in 1948 to get the document published. Senghor liaised with the assistant professor of history at the Sorbonne (Professor Michel Devèze) to review the manuscript. Professor Devèze was very interested in it but concluded that the paper was "a good start" and needed some work. Alioune Sarr reworked the document and in 1949 it was published by Présence Africaine. Although the document was previously unpublished, some were familiar with it and were using it illegally without giving credit to the author. The original document itself did not cover all the periods and some sections were somewhat brief. The Serer paternal Lamanic period was not covered in detail neither was the maternal Wagadou period (princesses from the Ghana Empire who married into the Serer paternal aristocracy – predecessors of the Guelowar). Nonetheless, historians such as Becker, Martin, etc., agree that, the original data were very numerous, and their contribution to a global history of these ancient kingdoms are indisputable.

During investigations in Kaolack about the history of its neighborhoods, the historian Charles Becker came upon the document with the assistance of Mamour Mbodj (who was then Chief of Tiofak). Becker contacted Sarr and an agreement was reached to type it up; add an introduction, bibliography and notes sections; publish it and attribute credit to the author. Numerous editions have been made to it including the 1963, 1986 and the 1983 edition by Becker. Alioune Sarr's "Histoire du Sine-Saloum" is one of the leading work on the history of Sine-Saloum a copy of the work was filed with the National Archives of Senegal (Archives Nationales du Sénégal). The unpublished work of his relative, the Goréen – Jean-Pierre Sarr was lost and has never been found.

== See also ==
- Kingdom of Sine
- Kingdom of Saloum
- Serer people
- Serer history (medieval era to present)
- Serer ancient history
- History of Senegal
- History of the Gambia

== Notes ==
=== Bibliography ===
- Diouf, Niokhobaye. "Chronique du royaume du Sine." Suivie de notes sur les traditions orales et les sources écrites concernant le royaume du Sine par Charles Becker et Victor Martin. (1972). Bulletin de l'Ifan, Tome 34, Série B, n° 4, (1972)
- Oumar Kane. La première hégémonie peule: le Fuuta Tooro de Koli Ten̳ella à Almaami Abdul. KARTHALA Editions, 2004. ISBN 2-84586-521-X.
- Institut fondamental d'Afrique noire. Bulletin de l'Institut fondamental d'Afrique noire: Sciences humaines, Volume 46. IFAN, 1985
- Hans-Jürgen Lüsebrink. Schrift, Buch und Lektüre in der französischsprachigen Literatur Afrikas. Niemeyer, 1990. ISBN 3-484-55005-8.
- Sarr, Alioune. Histoire du Sine-Saloum. Introduction, bibliographie et Notes par Charles Becker, BIFAN, Tome 46, Serie B, n° 3–4, 1986–1987
- DeCorse, Christopher R. West Africa during the Atlantic slave trade: archaeological perspectives. Continuum International Publishing Group, 2001. ISBN 0-7185-0247-7.
- Klein, Martin A. Islam and Imperialism in Senegal Sine-Saloum, 1847–1914, Edinburgh University Press (1968)
- Senghor, Léopold Sédar; Lambert, Fernando; Université Paris-Nord. Centre d'études francophonesLéopold Sédar Senghor. P. Seghers, 1988. ISBN 2-7384-0100-7
- Becker C. & Martin V. (1972) – Notes sur les traditions orales et les sources écrites concernant le royaume du Sine. Bull. IFAN, 34, B, 4 [1973]. pp 732–777.
- Martin V., Becker C. & Mbodj M. — Trois documents d’Ernest Noirot sur l’histoire des royaumes du Siin et du Saalum (Sénégal). Bull. IFAN, 42, B, 1. (1980) pp. 37–85.
- Kalidou Diallo, Le syndicalisme dans l'enseignement public en Afrique occidentale française, 1903–1960, L'Harmattan, 2011 ISBN 978-2-296-56044-4.
