= Maad Saloum =

Title for the King of Saloum in the Serer language

Serer royal and religious titles
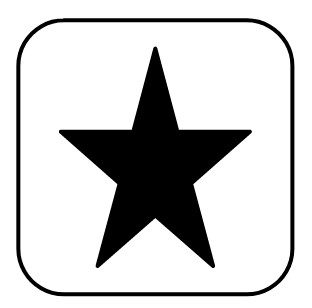
- Royal titles
- Lamane (also religious)
- Maad
- Maad a Sinig
- Maad Saloum
- Teigne
- Lingeer
- Line of succession
- Buumi
- Thilas
- Loul Religious titles
- Saltigue

Maad Saloum (variations :Maad a Saloum, Mad Saloum, Maat Saloum, Bour Saloum, Bur Saloum, etc.) means king of Saloum, in the Serer language.

The ancient Kingdom of Saloum now part of present-day Senegal was a pre-colonial Serer kingdom. Their kings bore the title Maad or Mad (also Maat though rarely used). The royal title was sometimes used interchangeably with that of their ancient kings and landed gentry, the lamanes.

From 1493 to 1969 (the Guelowar period, the last maternal dynasty in Saloum), forty-nine kings were crowned Maad. Mbegan Ndour (many variations: Mbégan Ndour or Mbegani Ndour) was the first Serer king from the Guelowar maternal clan to have reigned in Saloum, beginning c. 1493. Maad Saloum Fode N'Gouye Joof was the last king of Saloum. He reigned from 1935 to his death in 1969.

== List of Maad Saloum ==
Dates are approximative.

#	Name	Reign Start	Reign End
1	Mbégan Nduur	1493	1513
2	Guiranokhap Ndong	1513	1520
3	Latmingé Diélèn Ndiaye	1520	1543
4	Sàmba Lambour Ndiaye	1543	1547
5	Séni Ndiémè Diélèn Ndiaye	1547	1550
6	Lat Thilor Badiane	1550	1559
7	Walboumy Diélèn Ndiaye	1559	1567
8	Maléotane Diouf	1567	1612
9	Sambaré Diop	1612	1614
10	Biram Ndiémè Koumba Ndiaye	1614	1637
11	Ndéné Ndiaye Marone Ndao	1637	1639
12	Mbagne Diémel Ndiaye	1639	1645
13	Waldiodio Ndiaye	1645	1654
14	Amakodou Ndiaye	1654	1689
15	Amafal Fall	1689	1689
16	Amadiouf Diouf	1690	1696
17	Sengane Kéwé Ndiaye	1696	1726
18	Lat Thilor Ndong	1726	1730
19	Amasiga Seck Ndiaye	1730	1732
20	Biram Khourédia Tiék Ndao	1732	1734
21	Ndéné Ndiaye Bigué Ndao	1734	1753
22	Mbagne diop	1753	1760
23	Mbagne Diogop Ndiaye Mbodj	1760	1767
24	Sandéné Kodou Bigué Ndao	1767	1769
25	Sengane Diogop Mbodj	1769	1776
26	Ndéné Diogop Mbodj	1776	1778
27	Sengane Déguèn Ndiaye	1778	1778
28	Sandéné Kodou Fall Ndao	1778	1787
29	Biram Ndiémé Niakhana Ndiaye	1787	1803
30	Makoumba Diogop Mbodj	1803	1810
31	Ndéné Niakhana Ndiaye	1810	1817
32	Biram khourédia Mbodj Ndiaye	1817	1823
33	Ndéné Mbarou Ndiaye	1823	1823
34	Balé Ndoungu Khourédia Ndao	1825	1853
35	Bala Adama Ndiaye	1853	1856
36	Socé Bigué Ndiaye	1854	1854
37	Koumba Ndama Mbodj	1856	1859
38	Samba Laobe Fall	1859	1864
39	Fakha Fall	1864	1871
40	Niawout Mbodj	1871	1874
41	Sadiouka Mbodj	1874	1879
42	Guédel Mbodj	1879	1894
43	Sémou Djimit Diouf	1894	1898
44	Ndiémé Ndiénoum Ndao	1898	1901
45	Ndéné Diogop Diouf	1901	1911
46	Sémou Ngouye Diouf	1911	1913
47	Gori Tioro Diouf	1913	1919
48	Mahawa Tioro Diouf	1919	1935
49	Fodé Ngouye Diouf	1935	1969
50	Thierno Coumba Daga Ndao	2017	present (as of 2026)
