= Guelowar =

Former maternal dynasty in the pre-colonial Serer kingdoms of Sine and Saloum

Guelowar (or Gelwaar in Serer), also spelled Gelwar, Guelwar, Guelware, Gueleware or Gueloware, was a maternal dynasty in the pre-colonial Serer and Wolof kingdoms of Sine, Wolof Kingdoms of Cayor, Baol, Joloff and Saloum (in the Senegambia, but mainly in the western area of present-day Senegal). They were matrilineally from the Mandinka ethnic gr Gidan Wayaoup, and patrilineally of Serer origin. The offspring of Mandinka women and Serer men became the kings of Sine and Saloum. The same also for the kings in Joloff kingdoms in modern-day Senegal. The dynasty lasted from the mid-14th century to 1969, the year both kings died.

The terme "Guelwar", Anglicised or Franconised to "Guelwars", is the plural form. The singular is "Kelwar" (in Serer).

== History ==
=== Origin ===
The Guelowar family originated from Kaabu (centered in what is now modern-day Guinea Bissau) in the 14th century. Their oral tradition says that they are descended from Mansa Tiramakan Traore, a 13th-century cousin and general of Mansa (king) Sundiata Keita of Mali. Mansa Tiramakan Traore (also spelled in many variations: Tiramakan Trawally, Tiramakhan Traore, etc.) had conquered the Bainuk people and killed the last great Bainuk king, King Kikikor, then renamed the country Kaabu before his death in 1265. He was the founder and Mansa of Kaabu. Their oral tradition also says that they are the descendants of Mansa Bala Diakha and Maisata Yembe Kame Guélaware (king and queen of a province of Kaabu). Others say they are descended from the royal branch of Princess Tenemba. The Mandinkas who founded Kaabu married into the noble Bainuk families. The Mandinkas also changed their own names and adopted Bainuk surnames.

Kaabu was governed by the noble paternal "Sanneh" and "Manneh" clans (variations : Sane and Mane), with the noble maternal clans of Ñaanco and Guelowar. However, almost all the kings of Kaabu came from the Ñaanco maternal clan. The Guelowars were extended maternal relatives of the Ñaanco and one of their greatest threat to the throne.

== Migration to Serer regions ==
Henry Gravrand reported an oral tradition describing what he called the "Battle of Troubang", a dynastic war between the two maternal royal houses of Ñaanco and Guelowar, an offshoot and relatives of the Ñaanco (Nyanthio or Nyanco) maternal dynasty of Kaabu, in modern-day Guinea Bissau.

Here Gravrand has not noticed that this is actually a description of the 1867 (or 1865) Battle of Kansala, although the departure of the Guelowar can probably be explained by a war or a conflict of succession.

Whatever the reason, they left Kaabu c 1335. According to oral tradition they were a mixture of Mandinka, descendants of Mansa Tiramang Trawally (many variations: Tiramakhan Traore, Tira Makhang Trawally, Tiramanghan Trawally or Tiramang Traore) of Mali and the Bainuk nobility, from the patrilineages of Sanneh and Manneh (Sané or Mané). The Guelowars migrated to the Kingdom of Sine and were granted asylum by The Great Council of Lamanes (the Serer nobility). The marriages between the Serer paternal clans such as Faye and Joof to the Guelwar women created the Serer paternal dynasties and a Guelowar maternal dynasty which replaced the old Wagadou maternal dynasty. Maad a Sinig Maysa Wali Jaxateh Manneh (many variations in spelling: Maissa Wali, Maissa Wally also known as Maysa Wali Jon or Maysa Wali Dione) - (reigned 1350) was the first Guelowar king of Sine post Troubang (1335). Having served for several years as legal advisor to The Great Council of Lamans and assimilated into Serer culture, he was elected and crowned the first Guelowar king of Sine in (1350). His sisters and nieces were married off to the Serer nobility and the offspring of these unions where the kings of Sine and later Saloum (Maad a Sinig and Maad Saloum respectively).

The mainstream view has been that Mandinka Guelowars of Kaabu conquered and subjugated the Serer people. Serer oral tradition speaks of no military conquest, but a union based on marriage; a marriage between the noble Guelowar maternal clan and the noble Serer paternal clans, the descendants of the old Serer Lamanic class. Almost all the kings of Sine and Saloum bore Serer surnames not Mandinka. Maysa Wali's paternal descendants did not rule in Sine neither did they rule in Saloum. It was the paternal descendants of the ancient Serer Lamanic class who ruled. Serer language, culture, religion and tradition also prevailed in Sine and Saloum not Mandinka. The Guelowars were incorporated into Serer society and they saw themselves as Serers.

Although Wolof culture is also very strong in Saloum, just as Serer culture, Wolof people were migrants to the Serer Kingdom of Saloum. The Kingdom of Sine was ethnically Serer. The Kingdom of Saloum was mixed, but the non-Serer population were migrants.

== Senegambian kings from the Guelowar maternal clan ==
Some of the Senegambian kings belonging to the Guelowar maternal clan can be found below. Maad means king in Serer-Sine language. Maad a Sinig and Maad Saloum means "king of Sine" and "king of Saloum" respectively. There are many variations in the spelling of Maad. Sometimes it is spelled Mad, Maat, etc. Maad is also sometimes used interchangeably to refer to the ancient Serer kings – the Lamanes – who were the kings and landed gentry.

=== Kingdom of Sine ===
- Maad a Sinig Waagaan Tenin Jom Faye
- Waagaan Kumbasaanjaan Faye
- Laasuk Fanaan Faye
- Maad a Sinig Sanmoon Faye
- Maad a Sinig Niokhobaye Mane Nyan Joof
- Maad a Sinig Guejopal Mane Nyan Joof
- Maad a Sinig Kumba Ndoffene Famak Joof, king of Sine (Reigned: 1853 - 1871)
- Maad a Sinig Kumba Ndoffene Fa Ndeb Joof, king of Sine (Reigned: 1898 - 1924)
- Maad a Sinig Mbackeh Kodu Njie (M'Backé Mak), king of Sine (Reigned: 1884 - 1885)
- Maad a Sinig Mahecor Joof, king of Sine (Reigned: 1924- 1969)

=== Kingdom of Saloum ===
- Maad Saloum Mbegan Ndour, king of Saloum (Reigned: 1493)
- Maad Saloum Malaotan Joof, king of Saloum (Reigned: 1567)
- Maad Saloum Balleh Njugou Ndaw (Ballé Khordia Ndao), king of Saloum (Reigned: 1825 - 1853)
- Maad Saloum Bala Adam Njie, king of Saloum (Reigned: 1853 - 1856)
- Maad Saloum Kumba N'Dama Mbodj, king of Saloum (Reigned: 1856 - 1859)
- Maad Saloum Samba Laobeh Latsouka Faal, king of Saloum (Reigned: 1859 - 1864)

=== Kingdom of Cayor and Baol ===
- Damel Makodu Yandeh Mbarou Joof Faal, king of Baol (Teign) and of Cayor (Damel). Reigned: 1832 in Baol, 1860 - 1861 in Cayor. Died in June 1863 at Saloum (the ancestral land of his mother).

=== Kingdom of Jolof ===
- Bourba Mbagne Pateh Penda Kumba Ngouille Joof Njie - (Mbagne Paaté Coumba N'Gouye Diouf Ndiaye), king of Jolof (Reigned: 1846). Killed at the Battle of Diakhabour (1846).
- Bourba Biram Penda Kumba Ngouille Joof Njie - (Birame Penda Coumba N'Gouye Diouf Ndiaye), king of Jolof (Reigned: 1846). Assassinated in 1846.

=== Rest of Senegambia ===
- Mama Tamba Jammeh, king of Yilliyassa (in the Gambia), descendant of Lingeer Kaasa Mengeh (Kaasa Menge) of Saloum.

Around the 17th century, there were three main branches of the Guelowar maternal clan in the Serer kingdoms. They were founded by three sisters. They were Lingeers (queens or princesses) whose names are used to refer to their maternal descendants. They include:

1. The Keway Begay clan (English spelling in Gambia or Keve Bigui - French spelling in Senegal)
2. The Horaja Begay clan (Khoredia Bigui in Senegal)
3. The Jogop Begay clan (Diogop Bigui in Senegal)

The princes who belonged to these three maternal clans were engaged in several wars in Senegambia, in order to ensure the succession of their maternal clan. The Serer princes belonging to the clans Keway Begay and Jogop Begay were engaged in constant battles.

== In popular culture ==
- Guelwaar, a film by Ousmane Sembène (1992) which borrows the name.

== See also ==
- Kingdom of Sine
- Kingdom of Saloum
- Serer people
- Serer history (medieval era to present)
- Timeline of Serer history
- History of Senegal
- History of the Gambia
