= Maad a Sinig =

Title for the King of Sine in the Serer language

Serer royal and religious titles
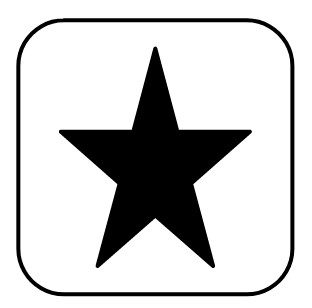
- Royal titles
- Lamane (also religious)
- Maad
- Maad a Sinig
- Maad Saloum
- Teigne
- Lingeer
- Line of succession
- Buumi
- Thilas
- Loul Religious titles
- Saltigue

Maad a Sinig (variations : Mad a Sinig, 'Maad Sine, Maat Sine, Bour Sine, Bur Sine, etc.) means king of Sine. The ancient Kingdom of Sine, now part of Senegal, was a pre-colonial Serer kingdom. Their kings were titled Maad or Maad (also spelled Mad or Maat). The royal title Maad is sometimes used interchangeably with their ancient kings and landowners - the Lamanes. Between 1350 and 1969 (the Guelowar period - the last maternal dynasty in Serer country), more than fifty Serer kings have been crowned Maad a Sinig.

== Kings of Sine titled Maad a Sinig ==
- Maad a Sinig Waagaan Tening Jom Faye
- Maad a Sinig Wagane Kumba Sanjan Faye (var : Waagaan Kumbasaanjaan Faye in Serer language).
- Maad a Sinig Laasuk Fanaan Faye
- Maad a Sinig Sanmoon Faye
- Maad a Sinig Niokhobaye Mane Niane Joof
- Maad a Sinig Gejopal Mane Niane Joof
- Maad a Sinig Ama Joof Gnilane Faye Joof, king of Sine (reigned : 1825-1853)
- Maad a Sinig Kumba Ndoffene Famak Joof, king of Sine (reigned: 1853-1871)
- Maad a Sinig Kumba Ndoffene Fa Ndeb Joof, king of Sine (reigned: 1898-1924)
- Maad a Sinig M'Backeh Kodu Njie (M'Backé Mak), king of Sine (reigned: 1884-1885)
- Maad a Sinig Mahecor Joof, king of Sine (reigned: 1924-1969)
