= Lamane =

Word meaning "master of the land" in the Serer language

Lamane or laman (also laam or lam) means "master of the land" in the Serer language. The name was also sometimes the title of chiefs or kings of the Serer people of the Senegambia region which includes modern day Senegal and the Gambia. This title was also used by some kings of the Wolof kingdoms. The title is sometimes used interchangeably with the old Serer title Maad. After the Guelowars' migration to the Sine and the foundation of the Kingdom of Sine, "lamane" denotes a provincial chief answerable to the King of Sine and Saloum.

Although the later lamanes were always descendants of the Serer village and town founders (the original lamanes), and their families ruled the Kingdoms of Sine, Saloum and Baol etc., the power they previously enjoyed as lamanes diminished, but they continued to make up the land-owning class. Though their power was somewhat diminished, their economic and political power was intricately linked to Serer custom, Serer history, and Serer religion. As such, they were extremely powerful if not as true kings as guardians of Serer traditions and beliefs and could dethrone a reigning monarch if threatened.

The lamanes were the guardians of Serer religion. They created sanctuaries and shrines in honour of the Pangool (Serer ancestral spirits and Saints). They are the predecessors of the Serer priestly class, the Saltigue (the "hereditary rain priests").

== Some prominent Serer lamanes ==
- Lamane Jegan Joof
- Lamane Jaw (or Lamane Diao) – King of Jolof 1285
- Lamane Pangha Yaya Sarr – c. 14th century lamane of Sine and an opponent to the Guelowar refugees.
- Sayerr Jobe, founder of Serekunda
- Latir Kumba Lô (nicknamed Lat Kumba Lo) of Latrikunda

== See also ==
- States headed by Serer Lamanes
- Serer history
- Serer ancient history
- Timeline of Serer history
