= Serer maternal clans =

Clans in western Africa

Serer maternal clans or Serer matriclans (Serer : Tim or Tiim; Ndut : Ciiɗim) are the maternal clans of the Serer people of Senegal, the Gambia and Mauritania. The Serer are both patrilineal (simanGol or Simangol) and matrilineal. Inheritance depends on the nature of the asset being inherited – i.e. whether it is a maternal asset which requires maternal inheritance (ƭeen yaay or den yaay) or paternal asset requiring paternal inheritance (kucarla). The Serer woman play a vital role in royal and religious affairs. In pre-colonial times until the abolition of their monarchies, a Serer king would be required to crown his mother, maternal aunt or sister as Lingeer (queen) after his own coronation. This re-affirms the maternal lineage to which they both belong (Tim). The Lingeer was very powerful and had her own army and palace. She was the queen of all women and presided over female cases. From a religious perspective, the Serer woman plays a vital role in Serer religion. As members of the Serer priestly class (the Saltigues), they are among the guardians of Serer religion, sciences, ethics and culture. There are several Serer matriclans; not all of them are listed here. Alliance between matriclans in order to achieve a common goal was, and still is very common. The same clan can be called a different name depending on which part of Serer country one finds oneself in. Some of these matriclans form part of Serer mythology and dynastic history. The mythology afforded to some of these clans draws parallels with the Serer creation narrative, which posits that: the first human to be created was a female. Many Serers who adhere to the tenets of Serer religion believe these narratives to contain profound truths which are historic or pre-historic in nature.

== Terminology ==
- In Serer, Tim (proper : o tim) means matriclan or the maternal origins of an individual. The term o tim ole (var : tim ola) means the matriclan or the name of the family by the mother's line. The name of the family by the father's line (i.e. surname) is called Simangol. This is the name that the Serer carry for example : Sain, Joof, Faye, Sarr, Ngom, Njie, Ndour, Senghor, etc., (see Serer patronyms and Serer surnames for variations in spelling in the Gambia and Senegal). The Serers are bilineal, that is, patrilineal and matrilineal. For more on this, see those articles as well as family name.
- The head of a matriclan is called Tokoor (or Tokor). The Tokoor is usually a very old man (the eldest male of the clan) and a rather important figure in the maternal family.
- ƭeen yaay or den yaay (var : den yay) — means maternal inheritance or matrilineage depending on context.
- A ndok ya — literally means a mother’s house (or cabin). In a historical sense, it can also means all those who trace descent from a direct maternal ancestor. The paternal alternative is mbin (as in Mbin Semou Njekeh - see the Royal House of Semou Njekeh Joof). All the members of this mother's house partains to the same matriclan.
- Maasir (Serer proper) also called Kalir (var : Kal) is a joking relationship between various patronyms of the same ethnic group (for example between the Faye and Joof family - who are both ethnically Serers) or between paternal and maternal first cousins (i.e. between someone and the offspring of his/her maternal uncle or paternal aunt). The term Gamo (from the Serer word Gamahou or Gamohou, which has Serer religious connotations) is used for the same purpose but between different ethnic groups (for example between the Serer, Jola and Toucouleurs, along with the Fula). Gamo is the proper term to describe these inter-ethnic joking relations, although it is common to hear it substituted with the terms maasir, kalir or kal. In the traditions of these groups, they are historical alliances between their ancestors, which were sometimes sealed with blood. These historical pacts dictates that these groups are required to assist one another in times of need; estopped from spilling the blood of another; give advice or even insult one another in a joking manner without the recipient taking offensive. In most cases, their descendants honour this ancient protocol to the present, especially between the Jola and Serer people who have an ancient relationship. This tradition which is present between Serer patriclans and in Senegambian culture, is also present among the Serer matriclans. They are historical alliances to which their descendants still adhere to. For more on this, see Serer - Maasir.

== Types ==
Serer matriclans can be divided into two types :

1. Those clans who are Serers by origin — through the bloodline. They are usually revered in Serer religion and/or legend or mythology, and form part of Serer ancient and dynastic history (only if they have established a maternal dynasty). They tend to be rather old clans and many of their historical narratives are lost to history.
2.Those who are assimilated to Serer culture through marriage (as stated were appropriated) — usually part of Serer dynastic history, especially Serer medieval history, but have no relevance in Serer religion, legend, mythology or ancient history. In certain cases, some of these clans attempt to advance their mythological legitimacy by affiliating themselves to the proto-Serer matriclans or adopting as totems — objects which are enshrined in Serer mythology.

Serer matriclans can be further categorized by splitting them into groups. For example, :

1. The Coofaan group (var : Tiofane or Tiofan) —: i.e. the Coofaan (itself a matriclan), Siañ, Pedior, Taa'boor (or Tabor) and Jolax (var : Diolah) matriclans.

== History ==
Serer matriclans and the role of Serer women are intricately linked to the Serer cosmogony and religion. In their cosmogony, the supreme transedental deity Roog (or Koox among the Cangin) created a woman first before man was ever created from the same divine placenta. In Serer religious symbolism and numbers, women share the same number with Roog (the number 3). The number 3 represents the celetral world in Serer symbolims and "numbers". Their creation narrative posits that : there were three worlds, three parts of the cosmos and three essential elements. Women are also linked to the Divine, who created the Universe via its divine female principles.

The ritual control of the marine life such as sea salt and fish, and that of rain and rivers including fire (for the purposes of farmland) are attributed to the first Serer matriclans. Many of the proto-Serer matriclans are found within the old villages of the Petite Côte in Serer country. The Faoye (var : Fa-oy, a locality of Sine-Saloum situated around 25 km south of Fatick) is also steep rich in tradition as it is in Ñakhar (or Niakhar). Like Ñakhar, Faoye account for many Serer matriclans including : Feejoor, Joofaan, Kare-Kare, Mengeeñ, Raaboor, Rik, Simala, Waale, Wagadu, Yiil, etc. These matriclans were integrated into the Kingdoms of Sine and Saloum. It is suggested that their initial role was religious in nature. Like the Serer patriclans (see Joof family), each Serer matriclan has its associated totem which are rooted in nature or the environment. The Serer Ndut call the ancestors the elements of the environment with which their matriclans are associated, and they differ from the patronymic totems which are related to prohibitions and taboos imposed on an individual by the Serer healers and priestly class. These beliefs are still prevalent, especially in funerals, which are expected to manifest these "ancestors", as well as when the totemic species (animal) needs protection.

Many Serer families can recite their maternal genealogy at least as far back to ten generations from the eldest living member of the clan.

=== The Serer group and matrilineality ===
The Serer ethnic group are very diverse and include : the Seex (pronounced Seeh, i.e. the Seereer Siin, the most numerous among the Serer group), the Ndut, the Saafi, the Laalaa, the Palor, the Noon, the Niominka, etc. All these people are ethnically Serers though some may speak the Cangin language rather than Serer or Seereer Siin. The Cangin is not a dialect of Serer. For more on this, see Serer people and the other relevant articles. Each of these groups have a way of stratifying their matrilineal system. The geographical spread of the Serer group also account for the different names used by these groups to refer to the Serer matriclans along with variations in language. However, the matriclans just like the ethnic group, are all interconnected and in many cases, the variances are minute. The Ndut matriclans have also settled in Palor country (also called Sili, which means Serer in their language) for a long time and their matrilineages still have land rights and distant relatives among the Palor as well as ancestral graveyards in Palor country. The same is true across the Serer group. The Lebou people also have Serer ancestry, and it common for them to have both Serer surnames as well as belonging to one of the Serer matriclans. Many of the Lebou ancestral spirits are actually the Serer Pangool (see Saltigue). The Palors and Ndut are found in Cayor; the Saafi, Noon and Laalaa in Baol; the Seex in Sine, Saloum (which includes Lower Saloum - modern day Gambia as well as the Gambian interior) and Mauritania, the Niominka around the Gambia and Senegal border.

The following table gives some of the variations in the matriclans among the Palor, Ndut, Saafi, Lebou and Seex :

| Palor clans | Ndut clans | Saafi clans | Lebou clans | Seex clans |
|---|---|---|---|---|
| Ƴuuɗ | Ƴuuɗ | Ƴuuɗ | Yuur | - |
| Lemu | Lemu | Lemu | - | - |
| Joofa | - | Joofa | - | Cofa (var : Coofaan) |
| Caagis | - | Caages | - | Cegandum |
| Yookam | Yookam | Yokam | Yokam (Dumbuur) | Bagadou or Bagadu (more commonly known as Wagadou) |

=== Role of the Tokoor ===
The Tokoor (or Tokor) is the head of the maternal clan usually an elderly man. He accumulates and safeguards the asset of the maternal lineage for the benefit of the whole matriclan and plays a major role in marrying off his maternal nephews and nieces. The word tokoor comes from the Serer word tokoor fee, which means maternal uncle. Another derivative of tokoor fee is "Takor", which is also a Serer first name as well as the name for a maternal uncle. Most Serer homes have an ancient artefact, beit a maternal or paternal asset. Some of these are religious in nature, others are of the material world. It is the responsibility of every family member to acquire treasure (halal in Serer) in order to increase the clan's wealth. Some of these treasures or assets may be jewellery, livestock, mechanical equipment, land, furniture, etc. Like paternal assets, the maternal asset of a particular matriclan determines their "collective power" and wealth, which may be drawn upon on certain occasions such as marriages, naming ceremonies or in times of need. Not everything is drawn upon. Some of these assets or treasures are far too precious to the matriclan and form part of their family history i.e. jewellery and land (see Lamane and Lamane Jegan Joof). The responsibility of the Tokoor is to ensure these assets are used wisely and appropriately. The assets which have been accumulated are rarely, if at all "used to reproduce the means of production". Instead, they form part of the total assets for the purposes of maternal inheritance (ƭeen yaay). The heir is only an administrator or custodian of these assets for the benefit of the co-heirs. He is estopped from diverting the maternal wealth from those activities which may benefit the co-heirs. In the old Serer tradition, even today, cattle make up a significant portion of the bride price. As a result, many Serer matriclans have increased their wealth and power through cattle.

[...] wealth, whether achieved initially through individual accumulation as in the Agni case, or through pooling, as in the Serer case, ultimately results in collective accumulation which preserves the ‘power’ of the community of Co-heirs. In the long run, competition and differentiation take place between matrilineages rather than individuals, and can be better represented in terms of ‘power’ - including demographic strength and symbolic power - than in terms of ‘wealth’.

— Jean-Marc Gastellu

== Matriclans ==
There are several Serer maternal clans. The list of clans given below is not exhausive. Many of these went on to establish royal dynasties in Senegambia or provided some of the kings of the Senegambia Region. Not all Serer matriclans went on to establish royal dynasties. Others are more mythological in nature.

=== Gareh Kareh, Rik & Gogol ===
The matriclans Gareh Kareh (variations: Garé Karé, singular : Kareh Kareh or Karé Karé) and Rik (singular : Tik) are two of the old Serer matriclans enshrined in Serer legend, especially the Gareh Kareh, more commonly referred to in academic papers as : Karé Karé (following its French spelling in Senegal). The Gareh Kareh matriclan is one of the better known Serer matriclans. According to the legend of these two clans, they both came from the same mother but diverged following a calamity. Their divergence is elucidated by the proverb : "what goes around comes around". As of 1983, the total Gareh Kareh clan in Ñakhar Arrondissement is estimated to be 1127, and 1336 for Rik. In Baol, the Gareh Kareh are called Gogol.

==== The legend of Gareh Kareh & Rik ====
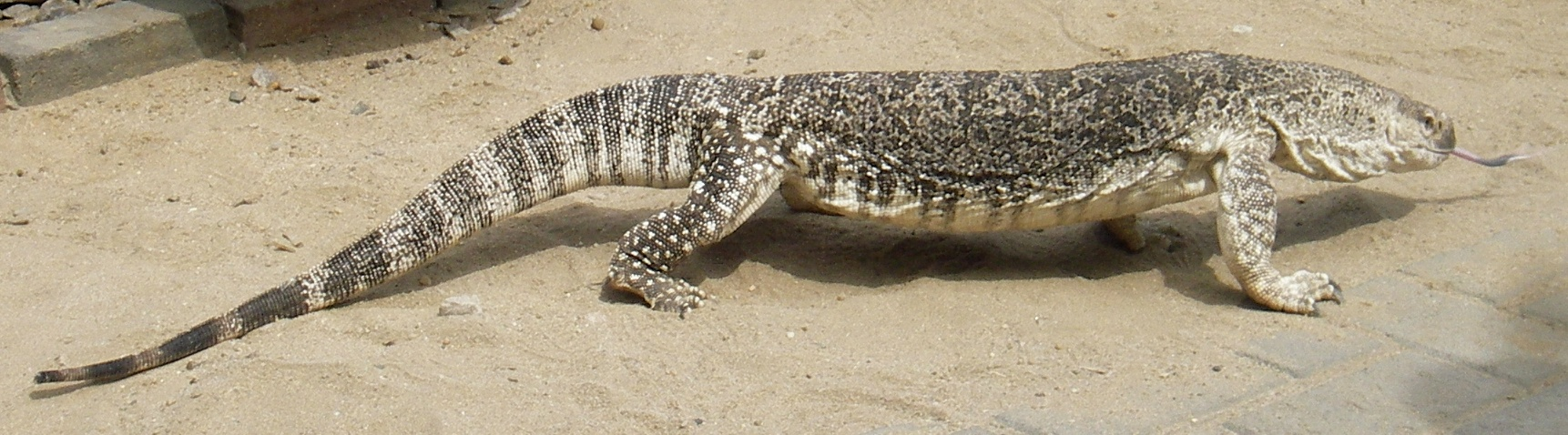
The totem of this matriclan is the savannah monitor, a species of monitor lizard.

These two Tim came from the same mother. Their animal totem is the savannah monitor — fasaax (and/or iguana). The Rik are also prohibited from touching the guiera senegalensis tree — (the sacred NGuƭ tree).

When their ancestors were about to die in the bush from thirst, they were guided by an iguana who climbed a baobab tree and quenched its thirst from the rainwater that had gathered in the hollow chamber of a baobab tree (mbudaay-baak or ƥaak). It was this animal that led them to a source of water in order to quench their thirst and from then on became the totem of this family. The legend went on to say that the ancestors of this family from then on had an extraordinary power to resist death.

Following a famine and disease that had ravaged their community, the ancestors of the Gareh Kareh matriclan stood away from the mortal remains in order to prevent the members of their matriclan suffering the same fate. Parents belonging to the other matriclans (tim) went to pay their last respects to the dead. The Gareh Kareh matriclan who had a technique for resisting death applied their powers in order to prevent the deaths of other families. All of the eldest sons of the Gareh Kareh family organized a procession from the entrance of the family home to the burial chambers in order to bar death's entry. Four times (the number 4 — symbol of the masculine world in Serer—numbers and symbolism) for a man and three times for a woman (the number 3 — symbol of the feminine world in Serer—numbers and symbolism), they performed this displacement carrying in their hands the stick of the Nduy tree (proper : Ndo'oy, variant : Ndooy — detarium senegalense) which they began hitting together in syncopation. On the last lap, they hit the roof of a burial chamber with the stick to prevent the disease that had killed their father from another matriclan from committing further havoc in the family. The split of the two matriclans occurred after the famine. During the famine, a Kareh Kareh woman asked for help, which was granted but with contempt and humiliation. One day, a donor Kareh Kareh sent a little girl carrying a calabash, and said :

In Serer : "Reti bis a saxal alé [aleh] o rik olehneh".
Translation : "Will carry the calabash little thing."

Having been called a "little thing", the group seceded and declared that their matriclan would henceforth be known as Rik. The term Rik means "the little thing". This remark is a derogatory remark, made in reference to the other family members but not necessarily directed at the little girl who was of the other matriclan (what became the Rik). In Ndut classical teachings, both matriclans are criticized. There is a special circumcision song which stigmatizes the poverty of the Rik and the avarice of the Gareh Kareh "in one quatrain without concession" :

In serer :

"Rik a paanga naak
baa mbar o mbambe
Gare Kare [Gareh Kareh] mbaaxeer,
a mbar o mbusu!"

Translation :

The Rik finished their cows,
And kill a kid!
The Gareh Kareh are worthless!
They kill an ox!

=== Jolax ===
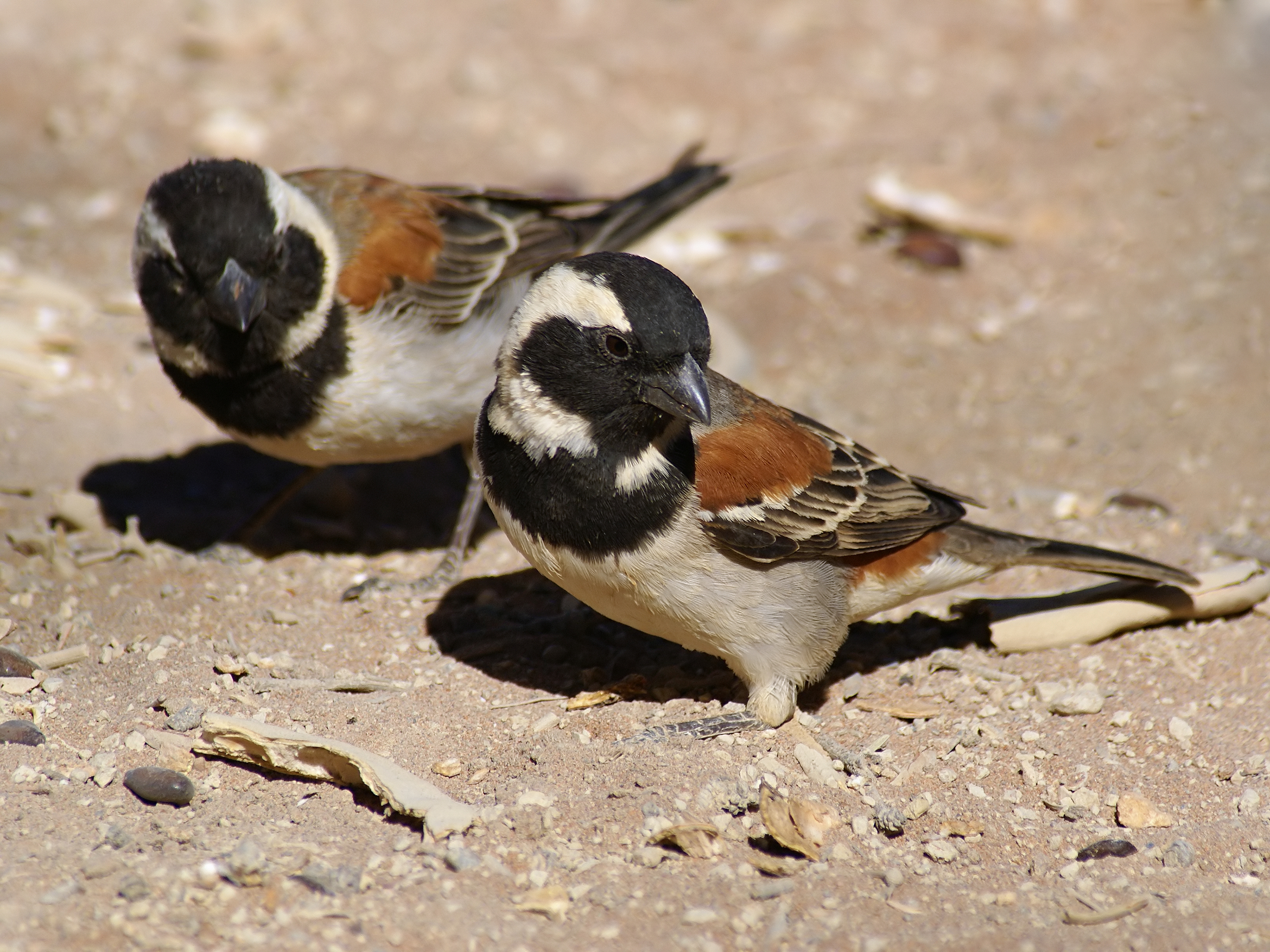
Male Cape sparrows.

Like the Gareh Kareh, the Jolax (var : Diolah, singular : Colax ) is one of the old Serer matriclans. Unlike the Gareh Kareh though, this matriclan is one of the most feared according to Serer legend because of their long involvement in the occult and the supernatural powers to use undesirable magic if they find the need to do so.

Their totem is the African sparrow. It is from this animal that they take their name from — Jolax (sparrow). It is reported that this matriclan does not appear to have many members. As of 1983, only 375 people are reported to be members of this matriclan, mostly concentrated in the arrondissement of Ñakhar (in Senegal). The Jolax along with the Siañ', Pedior and Taa'boor clans are classified as part of the Coofaan group (var : Tiofane or Tiofan).

=== Simala ===
The Simala are one of the three main Serer matriclans, the other two being Fatik and Koyeh (var : Koyé). The Simala are also usually referred to as the "men of the sea". What is known about this matriclan comes from the Serer oral tradition. According to the tradition, the ancestors of this clan were the Serers of Kaabu. Their ancestors came from Kaabu by sea. Having negotiated the rivers of Kaabu to the sea, they skirted the Atlantic coast around the north, just to the Saloum Delta. From there, they headed to the marigot of Simal — the upstream of N'Dangane. It is there they decided to settle and founded the village of Simal in the rias bend. Their earliest descendants later spread to the pre-colonial Kingdom of Sine, living around the Fatik, just to the north of the city of Fatick. The Simala and their allies (maasir) collectively make up the densest of all the tim in terms of population spread. Around Sagne in Senegal, they collectively represent 43.29% of the total population, and in Ñakhar Arrondissement, about 20.81% (1983 estimates). However, the Simala are not well represented in the north of Sine. In the Kingdom of Baol, where they are also present, their clan is called Rada Rada. The totem of this family is the black snake (Saamaand). This matrilineal family who live by fishing, have an old tie to the sea. Their ancestors used to worship the sea, which many of them they still do. Tradition dictates that, the death of a Simala brings common cold.

=== Fatik ===
There are various branches of the Fatik (or Fatick) matriclan which spread from the Kingdom of Sine to Saloum and beyond (see below —: Siañ, Xuter, Siwaña & Fata Fata). Like the Simala, it is one of the principal Serer matriclans. The city of Fatick in Senegal, and the region by the same name derive their names from the Serer term "Fati Ubadik" - which means "we have more to go".

==== Siañ, Xuter, Siwaña & Fata Fata ====
These four matriclans are of the same family. They are called by different names depending on which part of Serer country one finds oneself in. In the Kingdom of Sine, they are called Siañ; in the Kingdom of Baol, they are called Xuter; in the Petite Côte, they are referred to as Siwaña or Fata Fata. The name Fata Fata is commonly found in scholarly works. As a group, their narrative is found within the legend of Siañ, which posits that, the animal totem of their clan is the pelican. The Siwaña and Fata Fata used to belong to the same matriclan. Division of this matriclan occurred when their ancestors started to quarrel over a fish (mullet to be exact, called "a carox" in Serer). Having divided the fish among themselves, they then separated forever, hence the different names. Their custom dictates that, members of this matriclan[s] are prohibited from eating any part of the Njenje tree (erythrina senegalensis — part of erythrina), whose leaves can lead to a nervous breakdown among this clan, according to their beliefs. Collectively, their total number in Niakhar as of 1983 is reported to be 1590, making them the sixth most important Serer matriclan in terms of numerical strength. Along with their totem, the Siwaña are also prohibited from touch the Nile monitor lizard (cas).

The Fata Fata are also referred to as Pata Fata (var : Patafata), Pata Pata or Patik. The Patik matriclan founded the village of Ñirohmol, now practically a deserted village of Diokoul in the Serer pre-colonial Kingdom of Saloum. As with some Serer matriclans, the Patik are referred to by different names depending on region. Among the Serer Niominka (a sub-group of the Serers) of Gandoul, this matriclan is referred to as Pata Pata. In other parts of Serer country such as Boyard, Dioffior and Fadial, the matriclan is called Fatick or Fatik. The Pata Fata invokes the myth of the heroine Bandé Nambo (var : Bande Ñambo), herself affiliated to the Pata Pata or Pata Fata (i.e. Fata Fata) matriclan. These are terms used by the Serers of Saloum to designate the Fatik matriclan (of Sine)

Bande Ñambo was a member of the Serer patrilineage Sarr and the matrilineage Pata Fata. She was not the founder of this matriclan but one of the Serer matriarchs. She is regarded as a princess or founder of Gandun. Whilst the Simala matriclan are associated with the sea, the Pata Fata are regarded as the masters of salines (fata).

=== Koyeh ===
The Koyeh (var : Koyé or Koyer) make up the third of the main three matriclans. They are generally referred to as the "men of rushes". As of 1983, the Koyeh, Fatik and Simila collectively make up 20.81% of the residents of Ñakhar Arrondissement.

=== Cegandum & Kagaw ===
The historical narrative of the Cegandum (var : Tiégandoum, plural : Jegandum) and Kagaw (plural : Gagaw) is found within the hermeneutics of Serer religion and traditions. They are believed by many to be two of the proto-Serer matriclans. The major elements of the historical narrative of these two is summarized as follows :

1. One engages in cannibalism unknowingly,
2. Roog, the supreme transcendental principle entity (whom some Cangins believe to be Koox) intervenes,
3. One is afforded the highest spiritual honour in Serer religion.

==== The legend of Cegandum & Kagaw ====
The Cegandum matriclan used to lived with the Kagaw. One day a famine broke out. Two members of these matriclans travelled a long distance (accompanying each other) in search of food. Due to hunger and fatigueness, the Cegandum fell to the ground and was unable to move. The Kagaw clan member was powerless to help his companion because there was no food in the vicinity. He laid his companion down and begged him to wait whilst he go and look for food. Having walked some distance away from the sight of his companion, he cut a piece of his thigh muscle, made himself a fire, cooked the human flesh and took it to his companion (the Cegandum) to eat. The Cegandum ate it without knowing he was eating a human flesh. Having recovered his strength, they both carried off walking. Having walked some distance, the Kagaw began to lose blood and suddenly collapsed. The Cegandum asked him what the problem was and the Kagaw replied in the following terms:

The meat that you have eaten to save your life. It is this wound that prevents me from walking.

The Cegandum was unable to save his companion from his condition. At this moment, Roog, the supreme deity in Serer religion, intervened, and opened the heaveans. A heavy rain befell. This holy water not only nourished them but also healed the wound of the Kagaw. From that day on, Serer oral tradition generally refer to the Gagaw matriclan as Fog Roog, an endering term meaning kindred and friends of Roog. Although Roog has no cousins or parents, Serer religion and oral tradition lends support to the closeness between the Gagaw clan and the Divine. They both posit that, "the Gagaw matriclan were the first worshippers of Roog and the first to possess supernatural powers to perform miracles." They went on to say that, "the day the entire Gagaw clan die, rainfall will no longer be plentiful." The Jegandum have two totems : a type of snake called Cocom in Serer, and the striped—bull (Mbac). They are also prohibited from working on Sundays but this is believed to be a recent addition. In the arrondissement of Ñakhar, at least 1744 and 2050 inhabitants are reported to members of the Jegandum and Kagaw matriclan respectively (1983 figures).

Although the Cegandum and Kagaw narrative is well enshrined in Serer religion and tradition, a different matriclan known as Bagadu or Bagadou in Serer, and more commonly referred to as Wagadou (or Wagadu) brings a different dimension to the well established narrative. According to the advocates of the Bagadou matriclan, the historical adventure following the famine was between a Kagaw and a Bagadou (and not a Cegandum). However, this is not the generally accepted view. The Bagadou matriclan were a maternal dynasty in Serer and Senegambian medieval dynastic history (see Wagadou & Jaafun below). They have no significance in Serer religion. By trying to associate the Bagadou with the Kagaw, it is merely regarded as attempting to bestow religious legitimacy to the Bagadous. However, it is suggested that, the three matriclans Kagaw, Cegandum and Bagadou are allies.

=== Joofaan ===
This matriclan is linked to an early ancestor from the Joof family, and at Faoye (in Senegal), it is still the members from the Joof patrilineage who are the head of this matriclan (as of 2002). Like their Lamanic paternal ancestor who is associated with a Serer saint — i.e. the justicer Fangool—Lunguñ Joof, this matriclan is also revered in Serer religion, in particular, through the Serer Pangool. Although the Fangool Ngolum Joof (another Fangool from this family) is one of those ancient Pagool requiring a blood sacrifice (i.e. cattle), the totem of this matriclan forbids a blood sacrifice.

=== Soos ===
The origin of this clan is Mandé. For several centuries (i.e. from the medieval era) this matriclan formed as much alliances with many Serer matriclans as it possibly could, through marriage.

The Soos (or Sos) have become so "Sererized" and assimilated that most facets of their Mandé origin has been lost. The Soos assimilation to Serer culture is regarded by some scholars as sheer evidence of strong Serer culture. However, the Soos are few of those matriclans who became Serer through marriage, yet, held in high esteem especially in the Serer oral tradition. The Soos are one of the most well known Serer matriclans. For several centuries, they have formed a permanent fixture in Serer culture and country. According to their tradition, a Soos is prohibited from touching a partridge (ceбel in Serer) or the Nile monitor lizard (cas in Serer).

=== Peƴoor ===
The Peƴoor matriclan is one of the old Serer matriclans who are believed to have held sacred powers especially over the environment, in particular marine life. It is suggested that, this matriclan held great economic power right until the Guelowars' arrival in Sine (in 1335). The Peƴoor matriclan acquired substantial estate in Serer country especially in Sine. Forest burning in order to acquire estates (day or lamanat) was very common among this family. According to Serer tradition, this matriclan are believed to be masters of fire and rain, roles primarily reserved for the ancient Lamanes or Lamanic class and the Saltigues respectively. This makes them one of few if not the only matriclan who are associated with "mastery of fire and land" which are usually associated with the Lamanes, themselves considered the masters of the Earth, inherited through the patrilineal line. The tradition went on to say that, the presence of a clan member would activate a fire and the rain would accompany his death, which only their priests (yaal pangol) can stop.

=== Caxanora ===
Somewhat linked to the Peƴoor matriclan, the proto-Caxanora matriclan (variations : Caxanoora or o Tahanora) are afforded supernatural powers in Serer mythology and legend. According to their myth, they were once believed to possess the power to command the sea and fish at Fadiouth and south of the Palmarin, where they are still present. Their priests were required to take a plunge to the river in order to make offerings to the Fangool Mama Ngec who resides in the arms of the sea of Joal and Fadiouth. This custom is still practice by the high priests of this clan. Mama Ngec, the supernatural entity, is ritually venerated in order to increase fishing or in times of drought. Like the Gareh Kareh and Rik (see above), a Caxanora is forbidden from touching a savannah monitor (it is totemic).

The Caxanoras are related to the Pufun matriclan as well as the Coofaan clan of Saloum. They are regarded as the same clan. They merely branched out and adopted different names. Whilst the death of a Simala brings common cold according to the Serer myth, the death of a Caxanora leads to dying fish spread along the shorelines.

=== Wagadou & Jaafun ===
The Wagadous (Serer : Bagadou, other variations Wagadu or Ougadou) originally came from the Kingdom of Wagadou in the early medieval era, affiliated to King Kaya Magan Cissé whose descendants went on to establish the Ghana Empire (see Soninke people). The Wagadou princesses were married off to the Serer nobility such as the Joof family etc., and they jointly ruled the Kingdom of Baol along with other Senegambian pre-colonial states. By 1350, the Wagadou Maternal Dynasty collapsed in many Serer countries especially in Sine. However, they continued to rule in many parts of Senegambia including Baol and Cayor. The mother of the first "true" Damel of Cayor — Amari Ngoneh Sobell Faal (or Amari Ngoné Sobel Fall) was a Wagadou. Her name was Lingeer Ngoneh Sobell Njie (from the Njie family). Like the Guelowars (see below), this matriclan was assimilated to Serer culture through marriage.

The Wagadous of Sine are related to the Lokam matriclan of Joal and the Wagan (Serer proper : Waagaan) clan of Saloum. Though the Lokam and Wagan clan take their names from the Serer language, they are usually regarded as the same clan or extended relatives of the Wagadous. The Wagadous hold no importance in Serer ancient history, mythology or religion (see the legend of Cegandum & Kagaw" above), however, they form a major part of Serer medieval and dynastic history. Boulègue postulates that, the Jaafuns (Serer proper : Jaafuñ, other variation : Diafoune) are Soninkes and thus linked to the Wagadous. He went on to speculate that they (the Jaafuns) may have taken their name from the Soninke state of Jaafunu, located in the south-west of Wagadu, founded by a son of the founder of Wagadou in the medieval era.

Although both have no significance in term of Serer religion or mythology, in Serer country, they have adopted as their family totem the Mbos or Mboosé tree, one of the sacred trees enshrined in Serer cosmogony and Ndut classical teachings. The Jaafuns, like their Wagadou relatives are one of the medieval Serer matriclans with strong royal ties especially to the Kingdom of Baol where they married the Serer patrilineages who ruled by the Serer title Teigne.

=== Joos ===
The Joos Maternal Dynasty originated from the Serer pre-colonial Kingdom of Sine. The earliest recorded ancestor of the Joos clan is Lingeer Fatim Beye (c. 1335). Her grand daughter — Lingeer Ndoye Demba established this dynasty in Waalo in the 14th century (c. 1367) after she was married off to the king of Waalo — Brak Caaka Mbaar. The Joos Dynasty of Waalo lasted for nearly 600 years, and collapsed in 1855, the year Waalo fell to the French. The Joos as a matriclan goes back to Lamanic times.

=== Guelowar ===
The Guelowars were originally from the Kingdom of Kaabu. They were allegedly defeated by the powerful Ñaanco Maternal Dynasty at the so-called Battle of Troubang in c. 1335, an alleged dynastic war between the royal houses of Guelowar and Ñaanco. In reporting this tradition, Henry Gravrand did not notice that this is actually a description of the 1867 (or 1865) Battle of Kansala although the departure of the Guelowar can probably be explained by a war or a conflict of succession. After their defeat tradition says that they escaped from Kaabu, the country of their birth, and went to Sine where they were granted asylum by the Serer council of Lamanes. The Guelowar women were married off to the Serer nobility and they assimilated to Serer culture and traditions. These royal marriages created the Guelowar Maternal Dynasty of Sine and Saloum which lasted for 600 years (1350 — 1969 in Sine, and 1493 — 1969 in Saloum). Some sources suggests that, Yembe Kame Guélaware is the matriarch or earliest known maternal ancestor of this matriclan. Yembe Kame Guélaware was a Queen Consort (Maisata) of Bala Diakha - a medieval king (Mansa) of one of the provinces of Kaabu. The year of reign for Bala Diakha and Yembe Kame Guélaware is uncertain, but they are believed to have preceded Mansa Tiramakan Traore (one of Sundiata Keita's generals in the 13th century, c. 1235) who later conquered Kaabu. Other sources suggests they were the maternal descendants of princess Tenemba. In Serer medieval history to the present, the Guelowars are regarded as the last of the Serer matriclans. Unlike the proto-Serer matriclans who hold religious significance and enshrined in Serer legend, the Guelowars are merely viewed as the last maternal dynasty in Serer kingdoms but hold no religious significance in Serer religion or legend. Any link between the Serers and Guelowars prior to the Battle of Troubang is suggested to have taken place in Kaabu between the ancestors of the Serers of Kaabu and ancestors of the Guelowars.

=== Mouïoy ===
The Mouïoy (many variations : Mooyoy or Moyoy) are one of the oldest Serer matriclans. In the Middle Ages, they were one of the rivals of the Wagadous. The Mouïoy prominence came later especially in Cayor and Baol. Some of the earliest Damels of Cayor were Mouïoys (16th century). Deche Fou Njoogu (father of Amari Ngoneh Sobell) is credited as the first Damel, albeit his short reigne (1549, died the same year) was a Mouïoy and so was Biram Yassin Boubou (var : Biram Yacine Boubou, reigned : c. 1664 - 1681) and Ma Fali Gaye (reigned : c. 1683* - 1684) who was assassinated in 1684. From 1549 following the Battle of Danki to 1697 following the rise of the Geej Maternal Dynasty of Cayor and Baol, the Mouïoys were one of the dominant maternal dynasties of these two countries at least during this period.

==== The legend of the Mouïoy brothers ====
According to Serer oral tradition, the first Mouïoys were two brothers of noble birth, the eldest of which was destined to become a king. However, in his youth, he (the eldest) killed a man from a foreign family. In that distance past, Serer religious law dictates that a murderer must pay with blood for his action or in certain cases, deliver himself or a family member to the victims family to work in servitude if that is the will of the victim's family in a murder hearing for the purposes of tort. The killer failed to deliver himself to the grieving family. As he had no one to deliver other than his younger brother, the young man was delivered to the victim's family. Instead of the victim's family killing the young man, he was held in servitude for his older brother's deed. Without rest, the young man was required to work all day, and at night, he was chained in the most inhabitable hut. He spent most of his youth in servitude.

The Serer tradition is silent on whether this foreign family were royals from a foreign land or not. However, it went on to say that when the older brother took power in the country and became the king, he thought about liberating his younger brother, and accordingly, organized a great army to liberate him from servitude. The younger brother was successfully liberated and brought back to the palace. However, the stigma of servitude especially for a royal prince was unpalatable for the Serer community of that era, and he was regarded as nothing more than a liberated serf in spite of his royal blood. Therefore, the ambition of becoming a king one day was unlikely. As such, the younger brother's altered his royal ambitions from kingship to becoming a member of local government or even a military commander. He settled near the palace in order to part take in constitutional affairs as much as he was possibly allowed. A man who was gifted with wisdom and supernatural powers became the father of two Mouïoys. This man, regarded as the Tokoor of the clan, had before his death hidden a secret talisman in a special place within the palace so no one can gain access to it and reveal the powers contained therein. Due to an influx of visitors to the palace, the older brother took the charms to his younger brother for safe keeping. As such, the younger brother became the guardian of the family's secrets. Before going to a military campaign, the king (the elder brother) would slip the secret charms (rooster) in his younger brother's case for sacred washing and divination consultations. The younger brother who had gradually become a competent soothsayer was able to interpret the divination material. He used a pestle that he would place in equilibrium near the sacred places. If it remains standing, that signifies that the omens were favorable. If on the hand it drops, that signifies bad omen as it means that the king would not only suffer a severe defeat in war, but would also be killed in battle. The young brother's newly acquired powers earned him great respect and favour at least in his older brother's eyes. However, the esteem and respect afforded to him by his older brother was not matched by the Serer community of that era, who still regarded him as a liberated serf. When his elder brother died, not only was he barred from succeeding his late brother, but his entire descendants were barred from ascending to the throne. He "languished in grief" and later died. The Mouïoys that later ruled parts of the Senegambia Region were not from his direct line.

=== Beye ===
Beye (also Bey or Bèye following its French spelling in Senegal) is both a Serer surname as well as a Serer matriclan. This matriclan gained particular prominence in Cayor and Baol (who ruled by the titles Damel and Teigne respectively) especially in the later part of the 17th century. They were more successful in Baol than in Cayor where they provided one Damel by the name of Dé Tialao - the blind king who tried to conceal his physical disability but was later found out and deposed (reigned : 1693 — 1697). The demise of this maternal dynasty was not merely due to the discrimination of Dé Tialao, but also coincided with the introduction of a new maternal dynasty of Cayor and Baol (the establishment of the Geej Maternal Dynasty).

=== Geej ===
The Geej (many variations : Guedj or Gedj) matriclan gained prominence in the late 17th century. The Serer princess —Lingeer Ngoneh Jaye (var : Ngoné Dièye) of the Jaye family of Saloum was the mother of Damel–Teigne Latsoukabe Ngoneh Faal (the king of Cayor and Baol). Having battled against his paternal half brothers and cousins, this king (Latsoukabe) introduced the Geej clan (his own matriclan) to his realm, thus making it the reigning maternal dynasty of both Cayor and Baol. From 1697 to the late 19th century (the period both countries fell to the French), the Geej was the main reigning maternal dynasty of these countries. This matriclan has provided several Senegambian kings including Lat Jorr Ngoneh Latir Jobe, one of the better known kings of 19th century Senegambian royalty.

The Geej family of Cayor and Baol are related to the Soos family of Sine and Saloum, the country of their birth. They are usually regarded as extended relatives.

=== Gaanguuna ===
The Gaanguuna (sing : O Kaanguuna) are most numerous in Sine and make up the fifth largest matriclan in Niakhar Arrondissement. According to their family legend and history, they claim descent from an ancient and invisible power — Kangeer, one of the Pangool in Serer religion. The Gaanguuna clan are responsible for the Kangeer sacrifices to the ancient royal Lingeer (queen) who is reported to have bursted at the time of her death without pouring blood. Kangeer, who was an ancient queen and canonized as Pangool, is one of the most respected and venerated Pangool in Diakhao in Sine as well as the more ancient localities such as Fa Yil (also in the Sine), where this clan are also present. This matriclan precides over the religious affairs and sacrifices to the cult of Kangeer.

=== Other matriclans ===
The following are some of the other major matriclans :

- Taa'boor matriclan (var : Tabor) — their clan is linked to the Pangool Laga Ndong, whose libation is headed by this maternal family.
- Sass or Saas — the name for their clan is linked to the Saas tree which is enshrined in Serer cosmogony.
- Didink
- Bangai
- Siagne
- Biban
- Tied
- Tioka
- Baling

== Alliances (Maasir) ==
Alliances (maasir) between matriclans which are historical in nature was, and still is prevalent. Some of the most well known matrilineal alliances are given below. :

1. The Coofaan group which includes : the Coofaan, Siañ, Pedior (also : Feejoor or Peeĵoor), Taa'boor and Jolax (or Diolah) are allies of the Gareh Kareh, Kogol, Haleh (or Halé), Rik, Lumel, Saas (or Sass), Tioka and Sasan.
2. The Kagaw are allies of the Cegandum and Wagadou (or Bagadou).
3. The Joofaan are allies with the Feejoor (Peeĵoor or Pedior); the Waale have a bond of cousinage with the Rik and the Simala are allies with the Wagadou
4. The Gaanguuna are a major allies of the Simala.
5. The Soos are allies of the Jegandum, Kagaw, Coofaan, Taa'boor, Jaxanora, Siañ and Wagadou.

== Surnames of matriclans ==
The Serer people do not carry the surnames of their matriclans but they know them. The following table gives some of the matriclans, their totemic observances / myths and surnames :

| Matriclan | Totemic observance / myth | Surname of the clan |
|---|---|---|
| Peeĵoor (var : Pedor, singular : Feeĵoor) | The death of a Pedor will bring rain | Mbasor |
| Leket | Forbidden from touching turtle doves | Sukan |
| Siwaña (or Sivana) | Forbidden from touching the Nile monitor lizard (see above) | Mbangu |
| Simala | The death of a Simala brings common cold | Das |
| Caxanora | Forbidden from touching savannah monitors (cas) (see above) | Puham |
| Pata Fata | — | Bam |
| Waagaan | One of their observances dictates that they should do nothing on Sundays, but this is believed to be a new addition. | Dab |
| Soos (or Sos) | Forbidden from touching a partridge (ceбel) — (see above) | Banda |

== List of matriarchs ==
Serer royal and religious titles
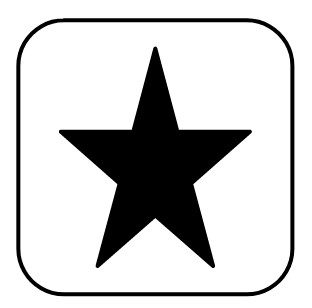
- Royal titles
- Lamane (also religious)
- Maad
- Maad a Sinig
- Maad Saloum
- Teigne
- Lingeer
- Line of succession
- Buumi
- Thilas
- Loul Religious titles
- Saltigue

The following is a list of known Serer matriarchs or dynasty founders. Those who are known to be queens, queen mothers or royal princess are prefixed with the royal title Lingeer :

- Lingeer Fatim Beye, Queen of Sine c 1335, matriarch of the Joos Maternal Dynasty
- Lingeer Bande Ñambo Sarr, a matriarch of the Pata Fata clan.
- Lingeer Ndoye Demba, Queen and Queen Mother of Waalo, c. 1367, grand daughter of Lingeer Fatim Beye. Lingeer Ndoye Demba established the Joos Maternal Dynasty in Waalo.
- Lingeer Ngoneh Jaye (var : Ngoneh Jaaye / Jaay or Ngoné Dièye) of Saloum, founder of the Guedj Maternal Dynasty (var : Geej or Gedj) of Cayor and Baol. Mother of Latsoukabe Fall (Damel of Cayor and Teigne of Baol, respective titles for the king of Cayor and Baol, reigned : 1697-1719). She was given in marriage to the Teinge of Baol — Che Yassin Demba Noudj. It is from that marriage that Lat Soukabe came from.
- Lingeer Bassine Soureh (var : Bassine Souré), matriarch of the Beye Maternal Dynasty of Cayor and Baol and mother of Dé Tialao (reigned : 1693).
- Lingeer Ngoné Dièye, 17th century Queen and Queen Mother of Cayor and Baol, and mother of Damel Lat Sukabe Fall

== Saying ==
Like the reverence held for the most ancient—Serer patriarchs (Mam o Kor), the reverence for Serer matriclans is also preserved in the following popular saying in pre-colonial Sine :

O lok yaa, ten fisu a Sinig.

[ It was a maternal baton which traced the Siin. ]

== The 1983 Ñakhar project ==
The 1983 Ñakhar project was a collaborative effort by various scholars and institutions such as Charles Becker, Léonce Crétois, Henry Gravrand, Victor Martin, Centre National de la Recherche Scientifique, etc., to research and document the Serer matriclans of Niakhar or Ñakhar arrondissement in Senegal. Ñakhar was chosen particularly because it is one of those Serer countries where the Serer religion is dominant, unpenetrated by Islam or Christianity. It is also a place rich in Serer traditions, itself located in the Fatick region which houses many of the Serer holy sites. The scope of the project included the documentation of the Tim in this Senegalese arrondissement, population and demographic spread, and the mythology associated with the clans, etc. The research was a long process but it was actually documented in 1983. A similar project had been undertaken previously by Gravrand, Martin and Crétois, and even before them by Lamoise in 1873 with his work on Serer grammar ("Grammaire de la langue Serer") which lists some of the Serer patriclans and matriclans and the myths associated with them.

== Filmography ==
- Boumi et l'oiseau pélican (1990) by Phillipe Cassard, Paris.

== See also ==
- The Royal House of Boureh Gnilane Joof
- The Royal House of Jogo Siga Joof
- The Royal House of Semou Njekeh Joof
- States headed by ancient Serer Lamanes
- Yaboyabo
- Serer creation myth
- Index of Serer matriarchs
- Index of Serer patriarchs
- Index of Serer surnames

== Bibliography ==
- Dupire, Marguerite, "Sagesse sereer: Essais sur la pensée sereer ndut", KARTHALA Editions (1994), ISBN 2865374874 (in French) (Retrieved : 31 July 2012)
- Dupire, Marguerite, "Totems sereer et contrôle rituel de l'environnement", [in] Persee (in French) (Retrieved : 9 August 2012)
- Kalis, Simone, "Médecine traditionnelle religion et divination chez les Seereer Sine du Senegal", La connaissance de la nuit, L'Harmattan (1997), ISBN 2-7384-5196-9
- Becker, Charles: "Vestiges historiques, trémoins matériels du passé clans les pays sereer", Dakar (1993), CNRS - ORS TO M. (in French) Excerpt (Retrieved : 31 July 2012)
- Faye, Louis Diène. "Mort et Naissance le monde Sereer", Les Nouvelles Editions Africaines (1983), p 59, ISBN 2-7236-0868-9
- Faye, Amade., & Agence de coopération culturelle et technique, "Le thème de la mort dans la littérature Seereer: Essai", Nouvelles éditions africaines du Sénégal (1997), ISBN 2723611078
- Faye, Ousmane, Diop, Adama, "Contribution a l'étude de l'histoire de Fa-oy des origines aux grandes migrations (XIII^{e} - XX^{e} siècle) : approche historique et ethnographique", Université Cheikh Anta Diop de Dakar (2002)
- Crétois, Léonce, Becker, Charles "Le vocabulaire sereer de la faune", (Editor: Charles Becker), Centre de linguistique appliquée de Dakar (1983)
- Sarr, Alioune, "Histoire du Sine-Saloum (Sénégal), Introduction, bibliographie et notes par Charles Becker. Version légèrement remaniée par rapport à celle qui est parue en 1986-87
- Lericollais, André, « La gestion du paysage ? Sahélisation, surexploitation et délaissement des terroirs sereer au Sénégal », Afrique de l'ouest, Dakar (21–26 November 1988), ORSTOM, . (in French) (Retrieved 3 August 2012)
- Gravrand, Henry, "La Civilisation Sereer - Pangool", vol. 2, Les Nouvelles Editions Africaines du Sénégal (1990), ISBN 2-7236-1055-1
- Gravrand, Henry, "La Civilisation Sereer - Cosaan", Nouvelles Editions africaines (1983), ISBN 2723608778
- Universität Frankfurt am Main, Frobenius-Institut, Deutsche Gesellschaft für Kulturmorphologie, Frobenius Gesellschaft, "Paideuma: Mitteilungen zur Kulturkunde, Volumes 43-44", F. Steiner (1997), pp 144–5, ISBN 3515028420
- Centre I.F.A.N. (Sénégal). Ministère de l'éducation nationale, C.R.D.S. (Sénégal), "Connaissance du Sénégal", Part 1, Centre I.F.A.N. (Sénégal) (1962), p 268
- Girard, Jean, "L'or du Bambouk: une dynamique de civilisation ouest-africaine", Georg (1992), pp 206–8, ISBN 2825704512
- Ngom, Biram: "La question Gelwaar et l’histoire du Siin", Dakar, Université de Dakar, (1987) (in French) (Retrieved 1 August 2012)
- Gastellu, Jean-Marc, "Petit traité de matrilinarité. L'accumulation dans deux sociétés rurales d'Afrique de l'Ouest", Cahiers ORSTOM, série Sciences Humaines 4 (1985)
- Gastellu, Jean-Marc, "Matrilineages, Economic Groups and Differentiation in West Africa: A Note", O.R.S.T.O.M. Fonds Documentaire (1988), pp 1, 2-4 (pp 272–4), 7 (p 277) (in English) (original publication in French : "Petit traité de matrilinarité") — (Retrieved : 31 July 2012)
- Gastellu, Jean-Marc, "L'Egalitarisme économique des Serer du Sénégal", IRD Editions (1981), ISBN 2709905914 (in French) (Retrieved : 31 July 2012)
- Université Cheikh Anta Diop, Faculté des Lettres et Sciences Humaines, Département d'Histoire, "Ñirohmol, un village déserté du Diokoul (Saloum) (XIV^{e}-XX^{e} siècle): histoire et archéologie", (présenté par Mamadou Lamine Camara), (2001)
- BIFAN, "Bulletin. serie B: Sciences humaines, Volume 41" (1979)
- Institut fondamental d'Afrique noire, "Bulletin: Sciences humaines, Volume 28", (1966), pp 610, 602 (BIFAN 1966)
- Thiaw, Issa laye, "Mythe de la création du monde selon les sages sereer", pp 45–50, 59-61 [in] "Enracinement et Ouverture" – "Plaidoyer pour le dialogue interreligieux", Konrad Adenauer Stiftung (23 and 24 June 2009), Dakar (in French) (Retrieved : 3 August 2012)
- "Bulletin de l'Institut fondamental d'Afrique noire: Sciences humaines, Volume 45", Institut fondamental d'Afrique noire, IFAN (1983), pp 387–401
- Diouf, Léon, "Eglise locale et crise africaine: le diocèse de Dakar", KARTHALA Editions (2001), p 147, ISBN 2845861710 (in French) (Henry Gravrand, "Cosaan" [in] Diouf) — (Retrieved : 3 August 2012)
- Ba, Abdou Bouri. Essai sur l’histoire du Saloum et du Rip. Avant-propos par Charles Becker et Victor Martin. Publié dans le Bulletin de l’Institut Fondamental d’Afrique Noire. pp 10–27
- Klein, Martin A, "Islam and Imperialism in Senegal Sine-Saloum, 1847-1914." Edinburgh University Press (1968), p XV
- Monteil, Vincent, "Le Dyolof et Al-Bouri Ndiaye," in Esquisses senegalaises (Dakar, 1966)
- Lamoise, LE P., "Grammaire de la langue sérère avec des exemples et des exercises renfermant des documents très utiles", Imprimerie de la Mission (1873)
- Kesteloot, Lilyan, Veirman, Anja, "Le mboosé : mythe de fondation et génie protecteur de Kaolack", IFAN (2006)
- Boulègue, Jean, "Le Grand Jolof, (XVIII^{e} - XVI^{e} Siècle)", (Paris, Edition Façades), Karthala (1987)
- Phillips, Lucie Colvin, "Historical dictionary of Senegal", Scarecrow Press (1981) ISBN 0-8108-1369-6
- Institut fondamental d'Afrique noire, Bulletin de l'Institut fondamental d'Afrique noire, Volume 38, IFAN (1976)
- Brigaud, Félix, "Histoire du Sénégal: Des origines aux traités de protectorat", Clair-afrique (1964)
- Glinga, Werner, "Literatur in Senegal: Geschichte, Mythos und gesellschaftliches Ideal in der oralen und schriftlichen Literatur", D. Reimer (1990), ISBN 3496004606
