= Kumba Ndoffene Fa Ndeb Joof =

King of Sine from circa 1898 to 1924

Maad a Sinig Kumba Ndoffene Fa Ndeb Joof King of Sine
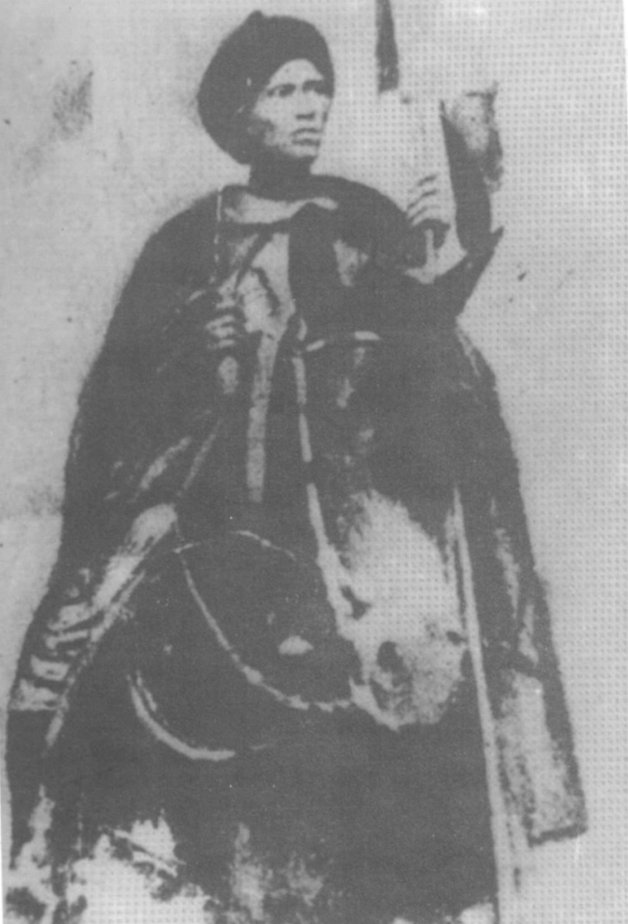
- The King of Sine Kumba Ndoffene Fa Ndeb Joof fully dressed in his ceremonial robe and mounting a horse. In his left hand, it looks like he is holding the flag of Sine.
- Reign: circa 1898 - 1924
- Coronation: Crowned c. 1898 at Diakhao; Kingdom of Sine, part of present-day Senegal
- Predecessor: Maad a Sinig Mbacke Ndeb Njie
- Heir-apparent: Maad a Sinig Mahecor Joof
- Prime Minister: His Great Jaraff (equivalent of prime minister) was Bandiougour Sène.
- Born: Diakhao, Kingdom of Sine, present-day Senegal
- Died: 21 December 1923 at Diakhao
- Issue: El Hajj Farba Diouf
Names
- Maad a Sinig Kumba Ndoffene Fa Ndeb Joof
- House: The Royal House of Boureh Gnilane Joof
- Religion: Serer religion

Maad a Sinig Kumba Ndoffene Fa Ndeb Joof (Serer: Maad a Sinig Kumba Ndoofeen fa Ndeb Juuf), also known as Kumba Ndoffene Joof II or Bour Sine Coumba Ndoffène Fandepp Diouf, was a King of Sine (in present-day Senegal). Maad a Sinig translates as "King of Sine", Maad meaning king in the Serer language or one who bears witness. The surname Joof is the English spelling in the Gambia. Diouf is the French spelling in Senegal (see: Joof family).

There is no consensus regarding the exact date that Maad Kumba Ndoffene Fa Ndeb succeeded to the throne. According to some, he reigned from 1898 to 1924, which correlates with the written sources available at the time. Other historians propose that, he reigned from 1897 or 1898 to 1923. This version agrees pretty much with the oral tradition of the Serer people. According to Serer tradition, the king was very ill before his death and ruled for 27 winters (27 years) before his successor - Maad a Sinig Mahecor Joof succeeded to the throne. When the King died, there was a period of mourning and it took a little while to prepare for the Coronation ceremony of Maad a Sinig Mahecor Joof according to Serer custom and tradition. Maad Mahecor Joof ascended to the throne in 1924, more precisely, according to some, on 28 January 1924. Regarding the year Maad a Sinig Kumba Ndoffene Fa Ndeb Joof died, there is consensus that it was in 1923, more specifically on 21 December 1923 at Diakhao.

Maad a Sinig Kumba Ndoffene Fa Ndeb Joof should not be confused with his great-uncle Maad a Sinig Kumba Ndoffene Famak Joof, also known as Coumba Ndoffène I, who reigned from 1853 to August 1871. The prefix Famak (or Fa mak) means "the elder" in the Serer language. Fa Ndeb (also :Fandepp, Fa ndepp or Fandeb) means "the young" in Serer. These prefixes were later additions (during and after the reigne of Maad a Sinig Kumba Ndoffene Fa Ndeb) to differentiate the two Kings of Sine who shared the same name and surname.

== Succession ==
Serer royal and religious titles
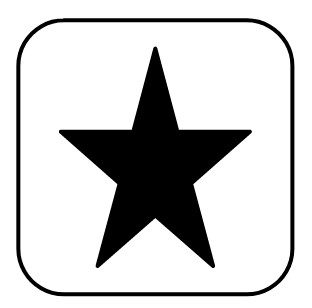
- Royal titles
- Lamane (also religious)
- Maad
- Maad a Sinig
- Maad Saloum
- Teigne
- Lingeer
- Line of succession
- Buumi
- Thilas
- Loul Religious titles
- Saltigue

His predecessor Maad a Sinig Mbacke Ndeb Njie died without nominating his Buumi (heir-apparent). At that time Maad Kumba Ndoffene Fa Ndeb was the Thilas (the second in line to the throne). Without a Buumi, Maad Kumba Ndoffene Fa Ndeb was elected by the Great Jaraff and his Noble Council, as King of Sine. On his coronation, he was crowned Maad a Sinig Kumba Ndoffene Fa Ndeb Joof from the Royal House of Boureh Gnilane Joof. His Great Jaraff (equivalent of Prime Minister) was Bandiougour Sène.

== French interference ==
The succession of Maad Kumba Ndoffene Fa Ndeb was unwelcomed by the French administration in Senegal, in particular by Hippolyte Alsace. The Great Jaraff and his Council of nobles who were in charge of electing the kings from the royal family were informed by Alsace that, he would not endorse their choice. The noble Council objected, and told him they had made their choice, and the people of Sine had appointed Maad Kumba Ndoffene Fa Ndeb as their king. This answer displeased the French administration. The Kingdom of Sine was divided into cantons and Maad Kumba Ndoffene Fa Ndeb was appointed Superior Chief of Eastern Sine and his rival Prince Kumba Jimit was made Superior Chief of Western Sine. The interference of the French administration in Sine and their attempt to divide the Sine into cantons were bound to fail. Whilst in theory Maad Kumba Ndoffene Fa Ndeb was a simple Chief, in practice, he was King of Sine. The Serers of Sine had elected him and they were reluctant to submit to the orders of anyone else. The flaws in this system became apparent when the Serer population of Western Sine refused to pay their taxes. When the French administrator Victor Valantin went to Western Sine in March 1899 in order to force the people to pay taxes, the Serers of Western Sine hid their children, their wives and animals, and took up arms. Valantin and his party were forced to make a hasty retreat. Relations between the French administration and the Serer nobility of Sine deteriorated further when Charles Lefilliâtre wrote to Prince Leopold Joof, the private secretary of the King, saying that "there was no king," and a letter to Maad Kumba Ndoffene Fa Ndeb calling him a "simple chief and nothing more." Lefilliâtre later retracted his statements and became the main supporter of Maad Kumba Ndoffene Fa Ndeb within the French administration of Senegal.

== Leadership ==
In 1901, Maad Kumba Ndoffene Fa Ndeb managed to prevent the creation of a Christian mission in Diohine and kept the Church out of Sine. When a disgruntled son of Damel-Teigne Lat Dior Ngoneh Latir Jobe (former King of Cayor and Baol) tried to incriminate Amadou Bamba by accusing him of pilling weapons in order to launch a war against the French administration, the French put Amadou Bamba on trial. Although Maad Kumba Ndoffene Fa Ndeb was a devout follower of Serer religion and not a Muslim, he was the only one who came to the defense of Amadou Bamba, and told the French administration to release him at once as the accusations made against him are nothing but lies. Amadou Bamba was released and all the false charges against him were dropped.

Maad Kumba Ndoffene Fa Ndeb Joof was an effective leader and his powers were very real despite French directives. When Farba Diouf (son of Maad Kumba Ndoffene Fa Ndeb) - himself a later convert to Islam, was once asked whether his father had ever contemplated converting to Islam. His response was: "Never!"

== Titles ==
Apart from being a Maad a Sinig (King of Sine) and previously a Thilas, he was also made Officier de la Légion d'Honneur.

== Legacy ==
Léopold Sédar Senghor, the poet and first president of Senegal, magnified the king of Sine in his famous poem "Joal" in 1945. He described in Homeric manner all the nobility that surrounded the King in his ceremonies, and went on to talk about how Kumba Ndoffene Fa Ndeb once tried to trim his royal robes, which he [Senghor] still remembers in adulthood.

Each year, the Mbacké family - the descendants of Amadou Bamba Mbacké give thanks to the Diouf family of Sine in remembrance of the day Maad a Sinig Kumba Ndoffene Fa Ndeb Joof came to the defense of Amadou Bamba against the false accusations levied against him. The event which is celebrated on 7 and 13 June each year, alternates between Diakhao (Capital of Sine and former residence of the King) and Darou Marnane. It is a major event.

Since 1983, the Joof/Diouf family have served as guests of honour at Touba's grand màggal. Villalón writes:

In 1983 Abdou Lahatte Mbacké, Bamba's son and successor as head of the Mouride order, came to Fatick personally to pay a visit to Farba Diouf in recognition of the service which the latter's father had performed for that of the former. The visit rekindled close ties, and since that date Farba Diouf has regularly attended the grand màggal at Touba as a guest of the Mbacké family.

== See also ==
- Serer people
- Kingdom of Sine
- Kingdom of Saloum
- Kingdom of Baol

== Notes ==
=== Bibliography ===
- Ajayi, J. F. Ade et Crowder, Michael, History of West Africa, vol. 1, Longman, 1985. ISBN 0582646839
- Brunel, Pierre (coord.), Léopold Sédar Senghor. Poésie complète, CNRS éditions, 2007, 1313 pp. ISBN 2271066042
- Diouf, Marcel Mahawa, Lances mâles: Léopold Sédar Senghor et les traditions sérères, Centre d'études linguistiques et historiques par tradition orale, Niamey, 1996.
- Faal, Dawda, Peoples and Empires of Senegambia: Senegambia in history, AD 1000-1900, Saul's Modern Printshop, 1991.
- Galvan, Dennis C., The State Must be Our Master of Fire, University of California Press, 2004. ISBN 9780520235915
- Klein, Martin A., Islam and Imperialism in Senegal: Sine-Saloum, 1847-1914, Stanford University Press, 1968. ISBN 0804706212
- Oliver, Rolan, Fage, John Donnelly et Sanderson, G. N., The Cambridge History of Africa, Cambridge University Press, 1985. ISBN 0521228034
- Villalón, Leonardo Alfonso, Islamic Society and State Power in Senegal: disciples and citizens in Fatick, Cambridge University Press, 1995. ISBN 0521460077

| Preceded by Maad a Sinig Mbacke Ndeb Njie | Maad a Sinig c. 1898–1924 | Succeeded by Maad a Sinig Mahecor Joof |
