= Djilas (Senegal) =

Coordinates: 14°15′N 16°38′W

Djilas (also spelled Djilass or Djilasse) is a village in Senegal located in the Sine-Saloum, in the west.

== Administration ==
It is the chef-lieu of the rural community of Djilas, located in the Fimela Arrondissement, of the Fatick Department and the Region of Fatick.

== History ==
Djilas is situated in the ancient Kingdom of Sine, one of the precolonial kingdoms of the Serer people. In precolonial times, the Thilas - a Serer title of nobility took residence at Djilas.

== Population ==
In 2003, the local population was estimated to be 2889 with 327 houses.
