= Diakhao Arrondissement =

Diakhao Arrondissement Jaxaaw
- Arrondissement
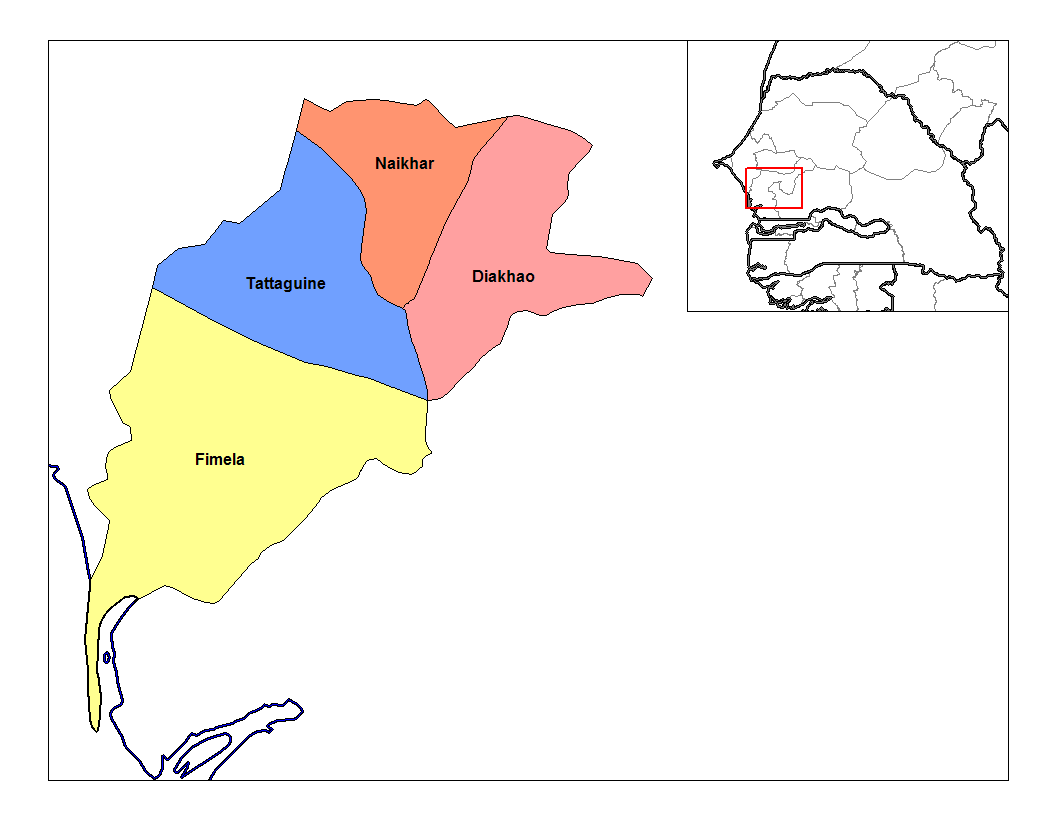
- Location in the Fatick Region
- Country: Senegal
- Region: Fatick Region
- Department: Fatick Department
- Time zone: UTC±00:00 (GMT)

Diakhao Arrondissement (Serer proper : Jaxaaw) is an arrondissement of the Fatick Department in the Fatick Region of Senegal. Its capital is Diakhao.

== Subdivisions ==
The arrondissement is divided administratively into rural communities and in turn into villages.

== History ==
Diakhao is over-run by the Serer people. It was once part of the pre-colonial Kingdom of Sine. Diakhao holds great prominence in Serer medieval history because many of the Maad a Sinigs (title for the king of Sine) were crowned at Diakhao, at least from 1350 during the reign of Maad a Sinig Maysa Wali Jaxateh Manneh to 1969, the year the last Serer king of Sine — Maad a Sinig Mahecor Joof died. As well as being the main capital of Sine, it was also the historical residence of many of the kings of Sine. Maad a Sinig Mahecor Joof died in Diakhao on 3 August 1969.
