= Tattaguine =

Human settlement in Senegal

Tattaguine (or Tataguine) is a town in the west of Senegal. It is also the name of the rural community.

== Religion and toponymy ==
Tattaguine derives its name from a bird called Tatta or Tat in the Serer language. According to Serer mythology, prior to human habitation of this locality, it was these birds that lived there. The word Guine is the name of the bird's egg, i.e. the nesting of these birds. Several Serer religious festivals and customs are observed in Tattaguine. The Ndut rite of passage (the circumcision rite for boys) is just one of many rituals that are observed. It is in this rite that they receive their education about the cosmos and the paranormal world. The classical Ndut teachings prepare boys to be brave and honourable men. The Ndut (nest) is the hut where they receive their education. It is also the place they develop their artistic skills : singing, dancing and composing songs which are religious in nature (see Njuup). The initiation usually takes place at night around a camp fire, where they are taught about the mysteries of the Universe, Serer medicine, etc.

Serer religion and culture forbids the circumcision of girls (FGM). Serer girls receive their initiation by tattooing of the gum. There is also the Bok ceremony for young married women. This is a fertility rite.

The Misse is a religious dance. It takes place once year in April which coincides with the Raan festival. It is a dance that implores the Serer deities for rain in order to have good harvest. It is sometimes referred to as the rain dance by some scholars. Somewhat similar to Misse is the Xooy or Khoy ceremony. The Xooy is not a dance but a religious ceremony where the Serer priestly class (the Saltigues) gather once a year to divine the future and the rainy season.

== History ==
Tattaguine is one of the old Serer countries though much younger than the historic and spiritual village of Yaboyabo. In Serer medieval and dynastic history, Tattaguine, which was in the pre-colonial Serer Kingdom of Sine was partnered with Ngouye because of their geographical affinity hence Ngouye-Tattaguine. Ngouye-Tattaguine gained particular prominence in the latter part of the 14th century, during the reigne of Maad a Sinig Diessanou Faye (king of Sine). It was one of the royal villages at that time. Diessanou Faye was the cousin and brother in law of Jaraff Boureh Gnilane Joof founder of the Royal House of Boureh Gnilane Joof, the first royal house founded by the Joof family. During France's colonization of Senegal, old Tattaguine was divided due to population growth. This demarcation led to the creation of new localities : i.e. Tattaguine-Sérère (or Tattaguine-Serer) and Tattaguine-Mbabara (Tattaguine-Bambara). The division of the old Tattaguine created Tattaguine-Sérère founded in 1901. Its first chief as of 1901 was Ngor Tine. The first chief of Tattaguine-Mbabara was Thierkoro Diakhate (also the same year). Since the division, position for the chief has become hereditary.

== Administration ==
Tattaguine is the chief town of the Tattaguine Arrondissement in the Fatick Department, which lies within the Fatick Region of Senegal.

== Geography ==
The closest localities are Yaboyabo (a holy place), Mbefel, Gaskor, Mboudaye Sek, Ndiefer and Gaolamboura Diarab.

== Population ==
Tattaguine's population consists mostly of the Serer people, the original inhabitants of this area. They make up 99% of the total population. Other groups include the Bambara people.

According to the site of PEPAM (Programme d'eau potable et d'assainissement du Millénaire ( 2012), the rural community of Tattaguine consists of 22,561 people and 2,552 houses. That is equivalent to 2423 people for 274 homes. As of May 2003, the estimated population was 20394.

== Economic activities ==
This Serer country used to be green and fertile, however, the peanut-monoculture has led to a decline in agricultural production and income. The main activity is seasonal subsistence farming. Crops grown include: millet, groundnut, cowpea (beans), watermelon, peppers, sorrel, bissap and tomato.

== Personalities ==
- Philippe seck NGOM of Ngohé Ndoffongor is the current president of the rural community
- Doudou Diop, the former director of Ngohé Secco Primary School (French: l'école primaire de Ngohé Secco)
- Babacar Ndiaye, the former director of El Hadji Moustapha Sarr Primary School of Tattaguine (Fr. l'école primaire El Hadji Moustapha Sarr de Tattaguine)
