= Loul Sessène =

Village

Coordinates: 14°18′N 16°36′W

Loul Sessène (or Loul Séssène) is a village in Senegal located in the Sine-Saloum area, in the West of the country.

== Administration ==
It is the chef-lieu of the rural community of Loul Sessène, located in the Fimela Arrondissement, of the Fatick Department and the Region of Fatick.

== History ==
Loul Sessène is located in the territory of the former Kingdom of Sine. In pre-colonial times, the Loul – a Serer title of nobility – resided in Loul Sessène, founded by the Sène family.

== Population ==
In 2003, the population was 3,601 with 407 houses.

== See also ==
- Loul
- Serer people
- Timeline of Serer history
