= Fatick department =

Coordinates: 14°21′29″N 16°35′09″W

Fatick
- Department
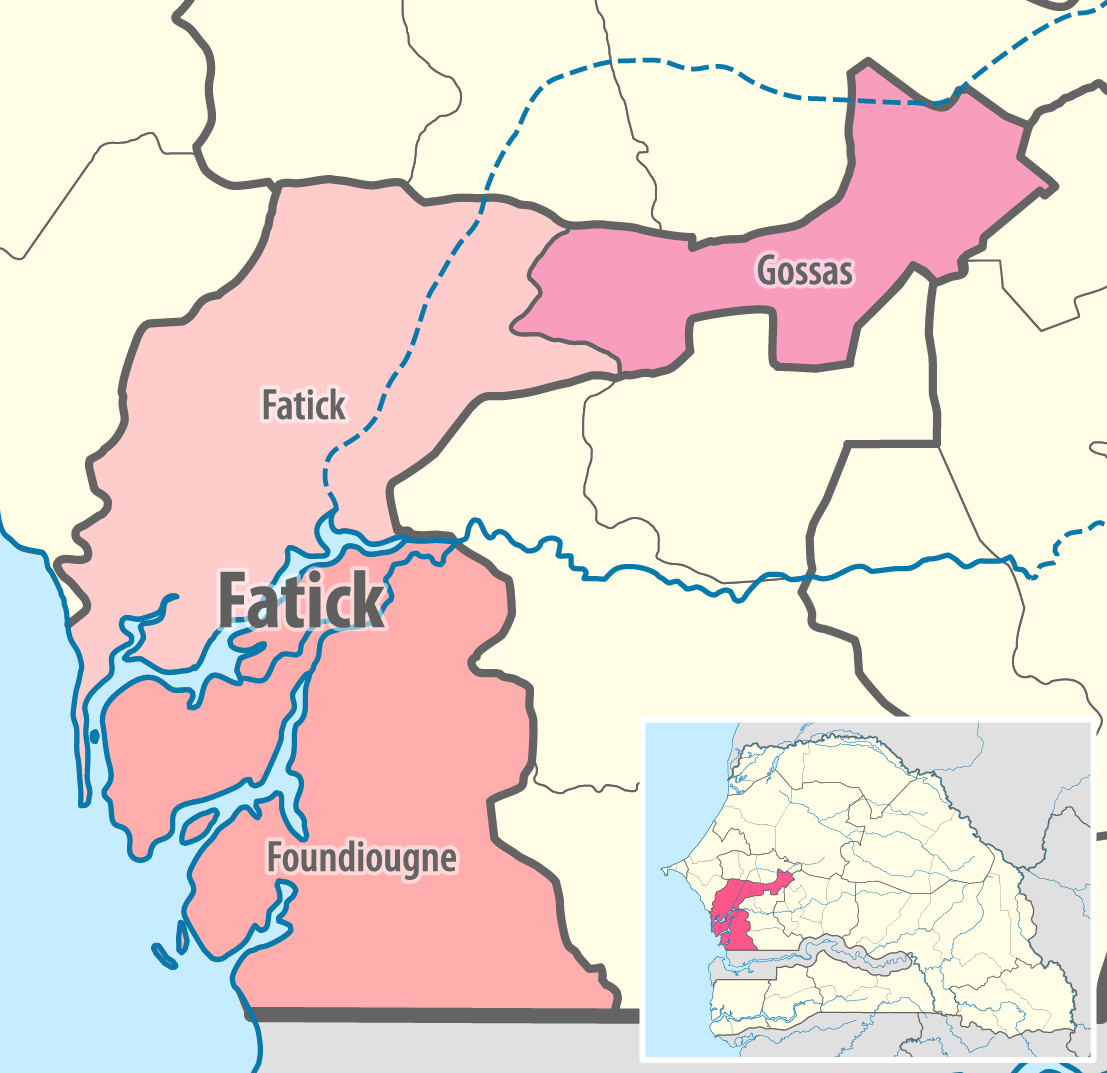
- Location in the Fatick region
- Country: Senegal
- Region: Fatick region
- Capital: Fatick

Area
  - Total: 2,646 km^{2} (1,022 sq mi)

Population (2023 census)
  - Total: 409,283
  - Density: 154.7/km^{2} (400.6/sq mi)
- Time zone: UTC+0 (GMT)

Fatick department is one of the 46 departments of Senegal, one of the three departments making up the Fatick region, and lies on the road between Mbour and Kaolack. The Fatick region is home to many Sereer people (or Serer); the Sereers are one of the major ethnic groups in Senegal and there are four Sereer dialects. At least 99% of the regional area consists Seereer, notably of Seereer Niominka people, and less than 1% of migrant Fulbe (1998 figures).

Fatick town is the major urban center for the region. The department has an area of 2646 km² and is divided into arrondissements, communes, and rural communities.

== Administrative divisions ==
There are two communes in the department: Diofior and Fatick.

The rural districts (communautés rurales) comprise:

- Arrondissement of Diakhao:
  - Diakhao (2011)
  - Diaoulé
  - Mbéllacadiao
  - Ndiob
  - Thiaré Ndialgui
- Fimela Arrondissement:
  - Djilasse
  - Fimela
  - Loul Sessène
  - Palmarin Facao
- Niakhar Arrondissement:
  - Niakhar
  - Ngayokhène
  - Patar Sine
- Tattaguine Arrondissement:
  - Diarrère
  - Diouroup
  - Tattaguine

== Historic sites ==
Fatick town

- Mbind Ngo Mindiss, site of offerings, situated on an arm of the sea, the Sine
- Diobaye, site of traditional ceremonies
- Jab Ndeb, sacred tree, at Ndiaye-Ndiaye
- Lutheran Mission building
- Prefecture building
- Tribunal building

Diakhao

- Royal house
- Tomb of Maad a Sinig Kumba Ndoffene fa Maak Joof
- Tombs of the Guelowar dynasty
- Tombs of the Lingeers at Diakhao Thioupane
- Kanger baobab tree of Diakhao, site of the offerings by the Seereer Kings of Sine
- Mausoleum of Maba Diakhou Bâ at Mbel Fandane

Fimela

- Tomb of Maad a Sinig Maysa Wali Jaxateh Manneh at Mbissel
- Wells and Mosque of El Hadji Omar at Simal
- Senghor family house at Djilor Djidiack

Niakhar

- Tumulus of Yenguélé
- Raised posts at Niakhar related to initiation
- Raised posts at Mboul related to initiation
- Fasaw, fangool (ancestral spirit) of the land of Njaafaaj

Tattaguine

- Remains of the Maad a Sinig Salmon Faye house in the village of Khodjil-Ndiongolor
- Raised posts at Bikol
- Gouye Géwel baobab tree at Toucar and Senghor
- Harwak, fangool of the maternal family Coofan at Fayil
