= Babacar Touré =

Babacar Touré may refer to:

- Babacar Touré (basketball)
- Babacar Touré (businessman)
