= Kahone Arrondissement =

Kahone
- Arrondissement
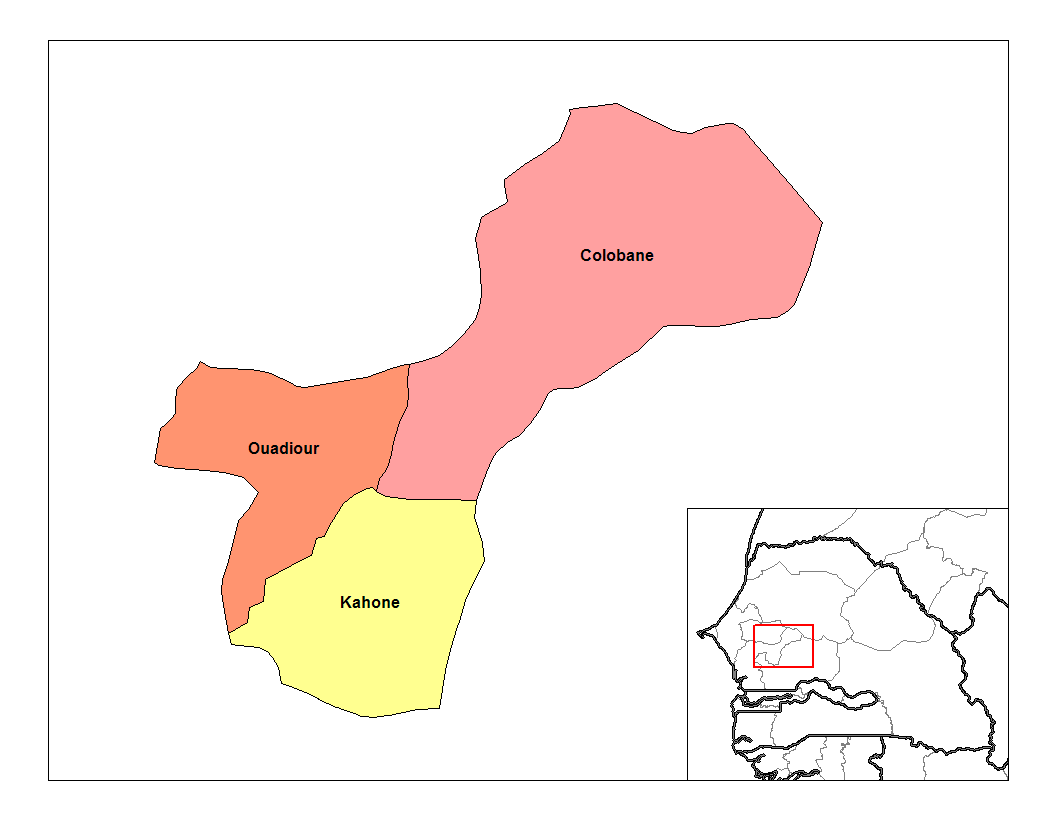
- Location in the Gossas Department
- Country: Senegal
- Region: Fatick Region
- Department: Gossas Department
- Time zone: UTC±00:00 (GMT)

Kahone Arrondissement is an arrondissement of the Gossas Department in the Fatick Region of Senegal.

== Subdivisions ==
The arrondissement is divided administratively into rural communities and in turn into villages.
