= Séssène =

Village in Senegal

Séssène is a locality of Senegal, situated in the M'bour Department and the Thiès Region, not far from Thiadiaye.

It is the chef-lieu of Séssène Arrondissement, one of the Arrondissements of Senegal.

Over run by the Serer people, it derives its name from one of the most revered Serer families in Serer religion (the Sène family, see also Loul Sessène). The chief of Séssène as of 2010 is Demba Sène. The current population as of 2012 is 1552.
