= Niakhar Arrondissement =

Niakhar Arrondissement Ñaaxar
- Arrondissement
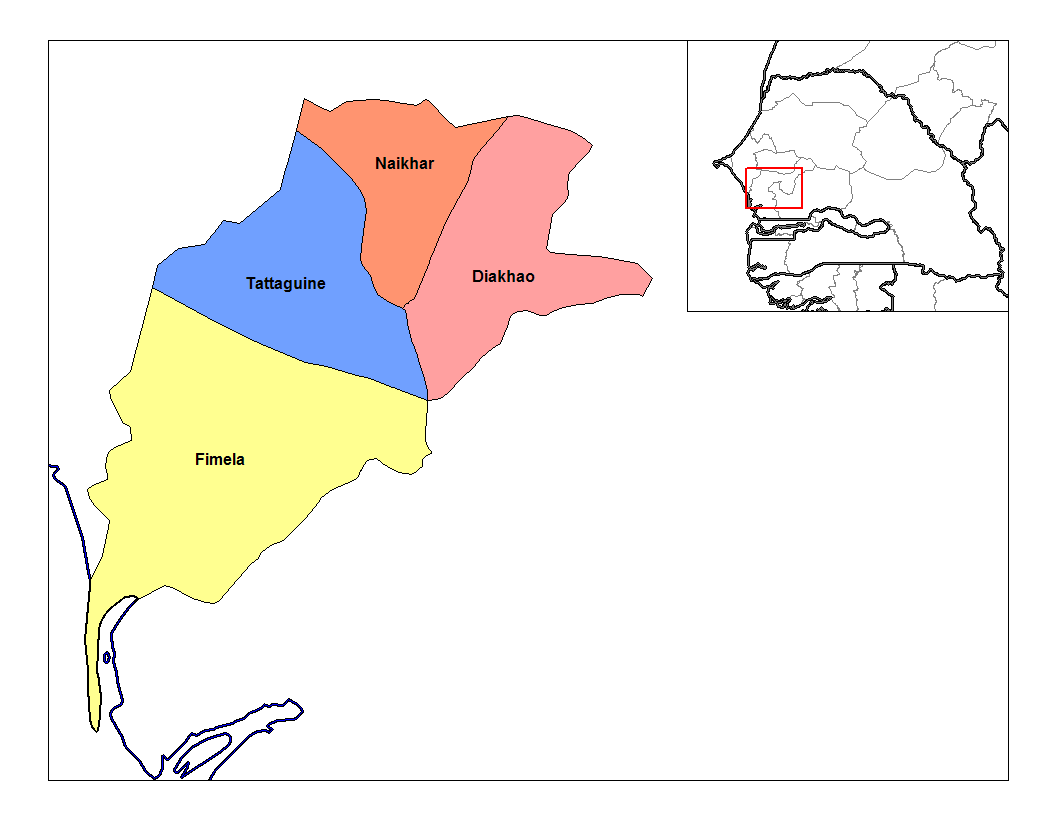
- Location in the Fatick Department
- Country: Senegal
- Region: Fatick Region
- Department: Fatick Department
- Time zone: UTC±00:00 (GMT)

Niakhar Arrondissement (Serer proper : Ñaaxar or Ñakhar, other variation : Nakhar) is an arrondissement of the Fatick Department in the Fatick Region of Senegal.

== In religion and mythology ==
According to Serer cosmogony, the Saas tree (acacia albida), which is considered to be a fertility tree and a tree of life among the Serers, is abundant in this area which assists in crop rotation and intensive farming. The Jolax matriclan, one of the old Serer matriclan who are enshrined in Serer mythology and legend, is also reported to be heavily concentrated in Niakhar Arrondissement. As of 1983, at least 375 people are reported to be members of this clan.

== Subdivisions ==
The arrondissement is divided administratively into rural communities and in turn into villages.
