= Mbissel =

Village in Senegal

Coordinates: 14°08′45″N 16°44′35″W

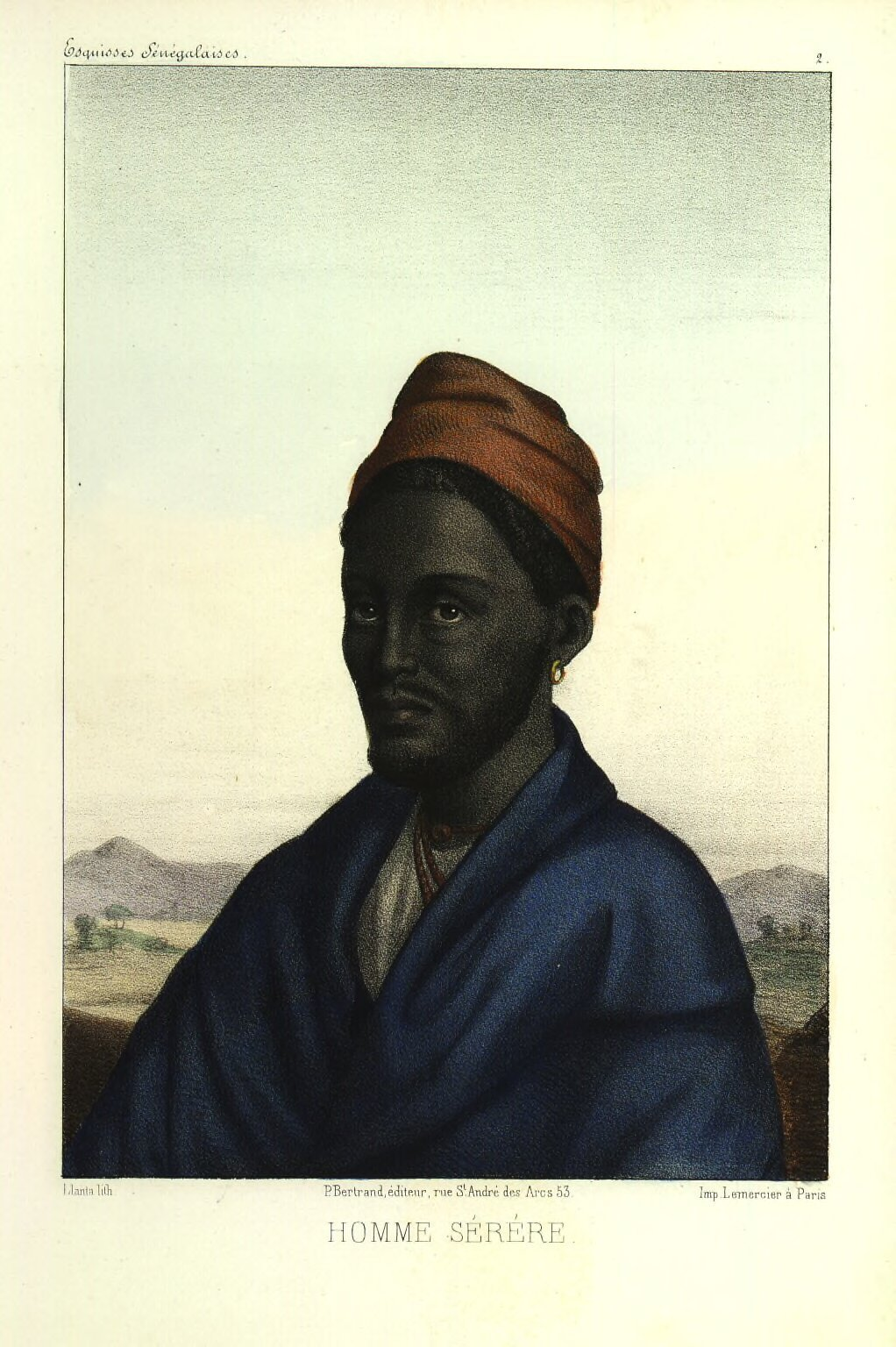
King of Sine Maat Sine Ama Joof Gnilane Faye Joof. Water colour taken in 1850, three years before the King's death

Mbissel is a village in the west of Sénégal. It is situated in the region of Fatick. The population is mostly Serer.

== History ==
Mbissel was the capital of the first Guelowar king of Sine - Maad a Sinig Maysa Wali Jaxateh Manneh commonly known as Maysa Wali Jon. Maysa Wali made it his capital in the 14th century.

The area just like the whole of Sine and Saloum has many historical monuments. The traditional site of the tomb of Maysa Wali is located in Mbissel.

== See also ==
- Kingdom of Sine
- Kingdom of Saloum
- Serer people
- Maat Sine Kumba Ndoffene Famak Joof (King of Sine 1853 - 1871)
- Guelowar
- Serer religion
- Mossane, a 1996 film directed by Safi Faye
