= Yaboyabo =

Ancient village in Senegal

Coordinates: 14°27′0″N 16°40′0″W

Yaboyabo (Serer, variations : Yaabo-Yabo, Yabo Yabo, YABO-YABO or Yabo-Yabo) is an ancient village in the rural community of Séssène (var : Sessene), in the Thiès Region of Senegal.

== History and religious status ==
Linked to Serer mythology and religion and deemed one of the Serer holy sites, Yaboyabo is one of the oldest villages in Senegal. According to the Serer creation myth, Yaboyabo takes its name from the first human couple (YAAB and YOP, var : YAAB and YOB) created by the supreme being Roog (or Koox among the Cangin). The narrative went on to state that, the original twins (female and male respectively) were carried from the Empyrean Heaven by an ark. This is believed to be deposited in the sacred village of Yaboyabo. Although the ark of Yaabo-Yabo is an ancient relic under the guardianship of this Serer village, and ritually venerated by those who adhere to the tenets of Serer religion, it is highly unlikely to be the original "ark" and was probably an ancient replica. Many Serer homes have ancient artifacts, some of which are religious in nature (see Serer ancient history).

== Population ==
The population is overrun by the Serer people, the original inhabitants. As of 2012, the population is estimated to be between 1715 and 1953.

== Geography ==
Some of the nearest localities include Tattaguine, Mbefel, Saokom, Sakone, Dom and Diarab. The closest major cities include Thies and Kaolack.

== Bibliography ==
- Gravrand, Henry, "La Civilisation Sereer - Pangool", vol. 2. Les Nouvelles Editions Africaines du Senegal (1990), ISBN 2-7236-1055-1
- Becker, Charles, "Vestiges historiques, témoins matériels du passé dans les pays sereer", CNRS-ORSTOM, Dakar, 1993, (Retrieved : 25 June 2012)
