= Buumi =

Royal title in several pre-colonial kingdoms of Senegal

Serer royal and religious titles
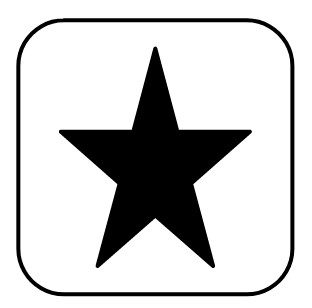
- Royal titles
- Lamane (also religious)
- Maad
- Maad a Sinig
- Maad Saloum
- Teigne
- Lingeer
- Line of succession
- Buumi
- Thilas
- Loul Religious titles
- Saltigue

Buumi (many variations : Buumy, Bumy, Bumi, etc.) was a royal title in the pre-colonial Serer Kingdoms of Sine, Saloum and Baol, as well as in the Jolof Empire.

== Among the Serer ==
In the Serer kingdoms, the Buumi was the first in line to inherit the throne of the Maad a Sinig (King of Sine) or Maad Saloum (king of Saloum). In some cases, a Buumi could act as regent if the king was too young, as was the case with Maad a Sinig Ama Joof Gnilane Faye Joof, whose uncle was appointed regent until he came of age. In Sine, the Buumi usually resided at Somb Rongodior. In many cases, he was elected by the Maad a Sinig, but the Great Jaraff and the Council of Electors decided which member of the royal family succeeded to the throne. When a Maad a Sinig died without nominating a Buumi, as was the case with Maad a Sinig Mbackeh Ndeb Njie, the "thilas" (the second in line to the throne) could succeed him, as was the case with Maad a Sinig Kumba Ndoffene Fa Ndeb Joof.

The Buumi had their own army and led a contingent of the country in times of war. At The Battle of Fandane-Thiouthioune (18 July 1867) also known as the Battle of Somb, the Buumi Somb commanded the army of eastern Sine. In the Kingdom of Saloum, which had a very similar political structure to Sine, the two most important were the Buumis of Kaymor and Mandak. In Sine, there was also the Buumi Nguess and Buumi Ndidor. Although they were all important figures, they should not be confused with the Buumi (heir apparent).

== In the Jolof Empire ==
In the Jolof Empire, the title of Buumi was adopted in the late 15th century after a long period of succession disputes between paternal and maternal lineages. Buurba Tase Daagulen, supported by the Loogaar of Waalo, had managed to take the throne. The Buumi, a descendant of the Waalo-Waalo family in question, became an important and powerful figure, nearly equalling the power of the Buurba himself. This power-sharing setup was designed to bring the succession crises to an end.

One of the earliest Buumi of Jolof, and the most well-known, was Buumi Jeleen Yatta Ntanye (also known as Bemoi amongst the Portuguese). In 1488 he visited the King John II of Portugal to seek support to claim the throne of Jolof. The King of Portugal granted this request, after his conversion to Catholicism, but Jeleen was assassinated by Pero Vaz da Cunha upon arriving at the mouth of the Senegal River. Da Cunha, the leader of the expedition, was afraid to stay in Senegal and risk dying of disease, but claimed that Jeleen had committed treason, hence why he was killed.

== Notes ==
=== Bibliography ===
- Diouf, Niokhobaye (1972). "Chronique du royaume du Sine". Bulletin de l'IFAN (in French). 34 B (4).
- Fall, Rokhaya (2013). "De la nécessité de réactualiser le recours à la « tradition orale » dans l'écriture du passé africain". In Fauvelle-Aymar, François-Xavier; Hirsch, Bertrand (eds.). Les ruses de l'historien. Essais d'Afrique et d'ailleurs en hommage à Jean Boulègue. Hommes et sociétés (in French). Paris: Karthala. pp. 15–29. doi:10.3917/kart.fauve.2013.01.0015. ISBN 978-2-8111-0939-4.
- Klein, Martin A. (1968). Islam and Imperialism in Senegal: Sine-Saloum 1847-1914. Edinburgh: Edinburgh University Press.
- Sarr, Alioune (1986). "Histoire du Sine-Saloum". Bulletin de l'IFAN (in French). 46 B (3–4).
