= Maad =

Title given to a male monarch by the Serer people of Senegal, Gambia and Mauritania

Serer royal and religious titles
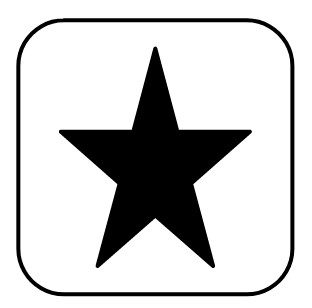
- Royal titles
- Lamane (also religious)
- Maad
- Maad a Sinig
- Maad Saloum
- Teigne
- Lingeer
- Line of succession
- Buumi
- Thilas
- Loul Religious titles
- Saltigue

Maad (in Serer, or Mad) is the title given to a male monarch by the Serer people of Senegal, Gambia and Mauritania. In Serer royal history, the Maad possessed supreme power throughout Serer country. The Maad was chosen from the royal lineage and crowned by the great Jaraaf (French: Diaraf) who was equivalent to a prime minister. After his coronation, he would crown a member of his maternal family, usually his mother, sister, maternal aunt, or wife as Lingeer (Queen). The Serer titles Maad a Sinig (King of Sine) and Maad Saloum (King of Saloum) take their names from the radical Serer title Maad, and identifies which part of Serer country they rule.

== Toponymy ==
In Serer, Maad mean king in its simplest definition. When referring to a king, the noun Maad is preceded by "o". For example "o Maad" (The King). In its historical context, Maad mean one who bears witness or to bear witness–denoting one who judges disputes, usually a king. Such judgments were carried out in public by the Serer kings. When used as a suffix, it identifies someones' noble status or function under the service of the king. For example, the term bii no maad means a noble, member of the royal family, the son of a king - one who got their nobility from their father; maad could also mean chief of a province.

The Serer term Maat is sometimes used interchangeably with Maad, but very rarely, and sometimes wrongly. In Serer, the term Maat is usually reserved for the ancient Serer kings whose function was also religious, for example the lamanes. Maat mean the reign of a sovereign, civil administration, and power. However, in its deepest, sacred meaning, it also means “the public thing”, in the highest sense of the term—evoking public order, order in the country, and manifests the natural inclination of the king/Serer man to want to capture the mystical aura that radiates from the Maat.

== Bibliography ==
- Diouf, Mame Birame, "La société sérère: organisation et cosmogonie : essai." Éditions Maguilen/Michel Lafon (2008), pp. 129–132, ISBN 9782355620034
- Faye, Souleymane, "Morphologie du nom sérère: système nominal et alternance consonantique." Université de Dakar, Centre de linguistique appliquée de Dakar, (1985), pp. 4, 7, 40, 70
- Reinwald, Brigitte, "Der Reichtum der Frauen: Leben und Arbeit der weiblichen Bevölkerung in Siin/Senegal unter dem Einfluss der französischen Kolonisation." Volume 9 of Studien zur afrikanischen Geschichte. Lit, (1995), pp. 16, 85–8, 94–95, 162, ISBN 9783894737788
- Bourdier, Jean-Paul; Trinh, Thi Minh-Ha; "Drawn from African Dwellings." Contributor: Thi Minh-Ha Trinh, pp. 198, 308, ISBN 9780253330437
- Gravrand, Henry, "La Civilisation Sereer" : "Pangool." Les Nouvelles Editions Africaines du Senegal (1990), p 36, ISBN 2-7236-1055-1
- Lericollais, André, "Paysans sereer: dynamiques agraires et mobilités au Sénégal." IRD Editions (1999), pp. 12, 51, 59, 63, 680, ISBN 9782709914413
- Sheldon, Kathleen E., "Historical dictionary of women in Sub-Saharan Africa", vol. 1, Scarecrow Press (2005) p 148 ISBN 0-8108-5331-0
- Gravrand, Henry, "La Civilisation Sereer" : "Cosaan." Volume 1 of La Civilisation Sereer. Nouvelles Editions africaines (1983), p. 68, 268-286 ISBN 9782723608770
- Sarr, Alioune, "Histoire du Sine-Saloum." Introduction, bibliographie et Notes par Charles Becker, BIFAN, Tome 46, Serie B, n° 3–4, (1986–1987), pp. 28–30
- Ngom, Biram, "La question Gelwaar et l’histoire du Siin." Dakar, Université de Dakar (1987), p 18
