= Thilas =

Serer royal and religious titles
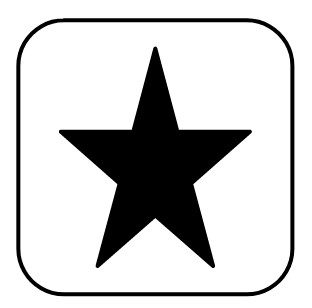
- Royal titles
- Lamane (also religious)
- Maad
- Maad a Sinig
- Maad Saloum
- Teigne
- Lingeer
- Line of succession
- Buumi
- Thilas
- Loul Religious titles
- Saltigue

Thilas (or tjilas, Djilas Tilas, etc.) was an ancient title of nobility used in the Serer pre-colonial Kingdoms of Sine, Saloum and previously the Kingdom of Baol, which are all now part of modern-day Senegal. The Thilas was the second in the order of succession to the throne after the Buumi who was the heir apparent. Only members of the royal family could hold this title. When a Maad a Sinig (King of Sine) dies without a Buumi, the Thilas could ascend the throne at the discretion of the Great Jaraff and his Noble Council of Electors responsible for electing the kings from the royal family. In the history of Sine to its 20th century history, such an incident is only known to have occurred once, at the succession of Maad a Sinig Kumba Ndoffene Fa Ndeb Joof (reigned c.. 1898 to 1924) whose predecessor died without a Buumi.

Before the abolition of the Serer monarchies in 1969, the Thilas always took residence at Djilas in the Sine.

== See also ==
- Maad a Sinig
- Maad Saloum
- Buumi
- Loul
- Lingeer
- Kingdom of Sine
- Kingdom of Saloum
- Kingdom of Baol
- Serer people

== Notes ==
=== Bibliography ===
- Diouf, Niokhobaye, « Chronique du royaume du Sine. Suivie de notes sur les traditions orales et les sources écrites concernant le royaume du Sine par Charles Becker et Victor Martin », Bulletin de l'IFAN, tome 34, série B, n° 4, 1972
- Klein, Martin A. Islam and Imperialism in Senegal Sine-Saloum, 1847–1914, Edinburgh University Press, 1968
