= Babacar Touré (businessman) =

Senegalese businessman and journalist (1951–2020)

- Born: 1 July 1951; Fatick, French Senegal
- Died: 26 July 2020 (aged 69); Dakar, Senegal
- Education: Centre d'études des sciences et techniques de l'information, Université du Québec à Montréal, Michigan State University, and University of Kansas
- Occupations: Businessman, journalist
- Known for: Co-founder of the Senegalese newspaper Sud Quotidien

Babacar Touré (1 July 1951 – 26 July 2020) was a Senegalese businessman and journalist. He co-founded and led the Senegalese newspaper Sud Quotidien.

== Early life ==
Touré obtained a master's degree in political science, journalism, and communication, as well as one in English. He graduated from the Centre d'études des sciences et techniques de l'information (CESTI) in 1979.

== Career ==
Touré began working for Le Soleil before earning a scholarship to study in the United States. He then studied at the Université du Québec à Montréal, Michigan State University, and University of Kansas. Upon his return to Senegal, he began working for Enda Tiers-monde, an NGO.

In 1986, Touré co-founded Sud hebdo, which became Sud Quotidien in 1993. He then began leading Sud Communication, a group that began Sud FM, Senegal's first private radio station. He was also a founding member of the Syndicat Professionnels Information Communication Sénégal (SYNPICS).

== Other positions ==
He was a member of the Social and Economic Council of Senegal, the Midwest Sociological Society, the National Democratic Institute, and the Panos Network. In 2012, Touré was appointed President of the Conseil National de Régulation de l'Audiovisuel.

== Death ==
Babacar Touré died on 26 July 2020 in Dakar.
