= Fimela Arrondissement =

- Arrondissement
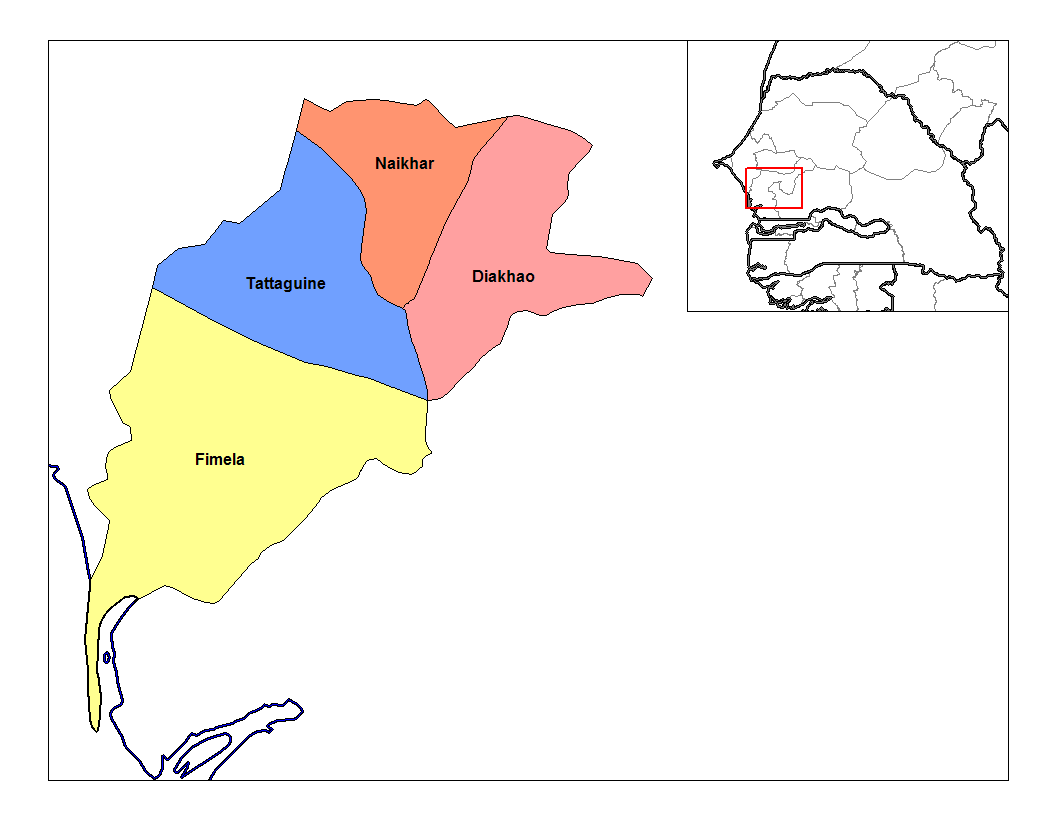
- Location in the Fatick Department
- Country: Senegal
- Region: Fatick Region
- Department: Fatick Department
- Time zone: UTC±00:00 (GMT)

Fimela Arrondissement is an arrondissement of the Fatick Department in the Fatick Region of Senegal.

== Subdivisions ==
The arrondissement is divided administratively into rural communities and in turn into villages.
