= Loul =

Serer ancient royal title

Serer royal and religious titles
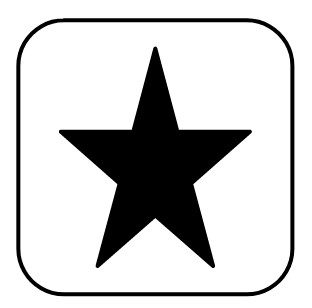
- Royal titles
- Lamane (also religious)
- Maad
- Maad a Sinig
- Maad Saloum
- Teigne
- Lingeer
- Line of succession
- Buumi
- Thilas
- Loul Religious titles
- Saltigue

The title Loul (or Lul) is an ancient royal title used in the pre-colonial Serer kingdoms, such as the Kingdom of Sine, the Kingdom of Saloum and formerly the Kingdom of Baol. These three pre-colonial kingdoms are now part of independent Senegal. The Loul was the third in line to the throne after the Buumi and Thilas. In old Serer language, Loul means "envoyer" (to send).

Some have advanced the claim that the title itself derived from the Lamanic era - (ancient kings and landed gentry of the Serer people) and was generally reserved for the lamane Sène, the head of the Sène family (or Sene).

In the pre-colonial period, the Loul took residence at Loul Sessène, now part of the Fatick Region, founded by the Sène family.

== Notes ==
=== Bibliography ===
- Diouf, Niokhobaye, « Chronique du royaume du Sine. Suivie de notes sur les traditions orales et les sources écrites concernant le royaume du Sine par Charles Becker et Victor Martin », Bulletin de l'IFAN, tome 34, série B, numéro 4, 1972
- Sarr, Alioune, Histoire du Sine-Saloum. Introduction, bibliographie et Notes par Charles Becker, Bulletin de l'IFAN, tome 46, série B, numéros 3–4, 1986–1987
- Klein, Martin A., Islam and Imperialism in Senegal Sine-Saloum, 1847–1914, Edinburgh University Press, 1968
- Diop, Papa Samba, Glossaire du roman sénégalais, L'Harmattan, 2010, p. 92, ISBN 978-2-296-11508-8
