= Thiadiaye Arrondissement =

- Arrondissement
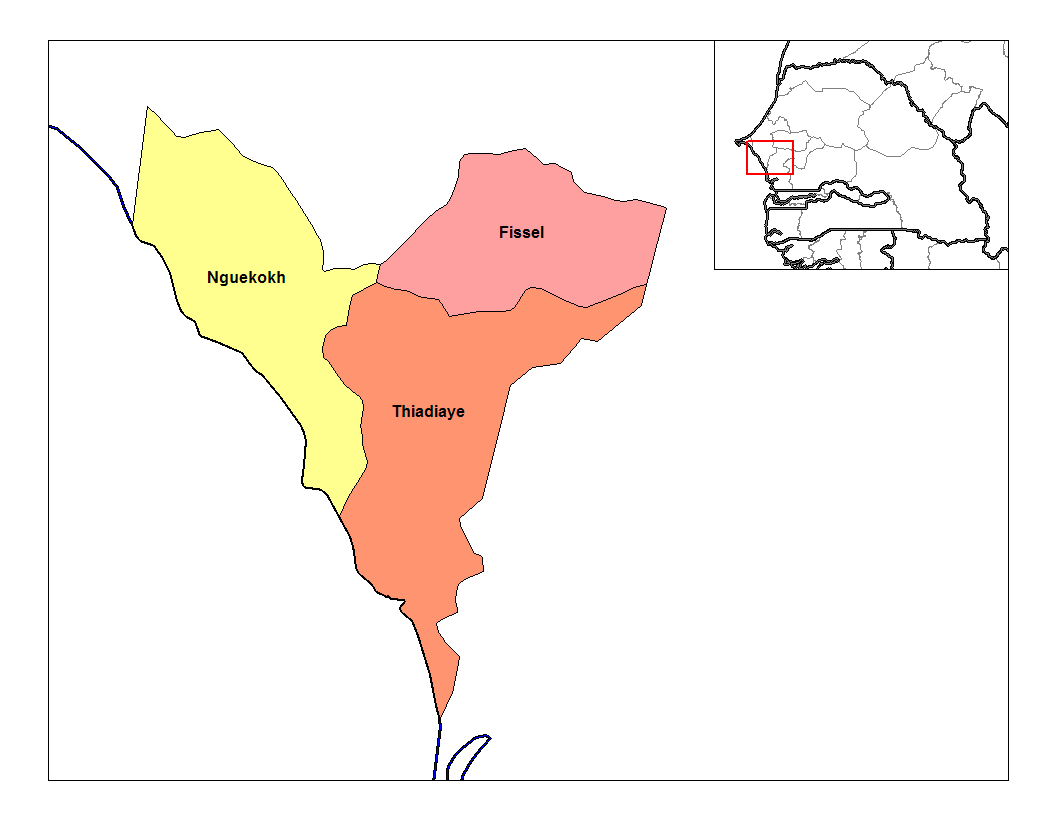
- Location in the M'bour Department
- Country: Senegal
- Region: Thiès Region
- Department: M'bour Department
- Time zone: UTC±00:00 (GMT)

Thiadiaye Arrondissement is an arrondissement of the M'bour Department in the Thiès Region of Senegal.

== Subdivisions ==
The Thiadiaye arrondissement is divided administratively into rural communities. These in turn are subdivided into villages.
