= Diakhao =

- Town and commune
- Location within Senegal
- Coordinates: 14.46209°N 16.29039°W
- Country: Senegal
- Region: Fatick Region
- Department: Fatick Department

Area
  - Town and commune: 11.71 km^{2} (4.52 sq mi)

Population (2023 census)
  - Town and commune: 5,590
  - Density: 477/km^{2} (1,240/sq mi)

Diakhao (Serer proper : Jaxaaw) is a small town and commune in the Fatick Region in the west of Senegal.

== History ==
Diakhao was the last capital of the pre-colonial Serer Kingdom of Sine. It has several sites classified as historical monuments. It houses the tombs of the Serer kings such as Maad a Sinig Kumba Ndoffene Famak Joof (king of Sine), the tombs of the Guelowars, the Lingeers and the Kanger (or Kangeer) baobab, a place of libation of the kings of Sine (Maad a Sinig).

In 1867 at the Surprise of Mbin o Ngor (a surprise attack against the Serers by the Muslim marabout which precipitated the Battle of Fandane-Thiouthioune), Diakhao was burned to the ground by the marabouts. To rebuild his capital (Diakhao), Maad a Sinig Kumba Ndoffene Famak implemented new tax measures throughout the Sine. Although Maad a Sinig Kumba Ndoffene Famak had no problem collecting taxes in other areas of Sine, he failed in Joal, one of the principalities of Sine occupied by the French administration. For years he tried to exercise his authority in Joal. In August 1871, he went to Joal to deal with the French and exercise his authority in the area. He was assassinated.

== Administration ==
Diakhao is a rural commune in the Department of Fatick (in Fatick Region).

== Geography ==
The closest localities are Soror, Gadoguene, Ndidor, Tela, Maronem, Ngekor, Ndofene, Ndofane and Ndielem Farha.

== Population ==
Diakhao, which is inhabited by the Serer people is one of the Serer countries. According to PEPAM (Programme d'eau potable et d'assainissement du Millénaire), the estimated population is 3429.

== See also ==
- Serer ancient history
- Index of Serer royalty
