= Fatick =

- Town and commune
- Location within Senegal
- Coordinates: 14°20′0″N 16°24′25″W
- Country: Senegal
- Region: Fatick Region

Area
  - Town and commune: 16.01 km^{2} (6.18 sq mi)

Population (2023 census)
  - Town and commune: 39,361
  - Density: 2,459/km^{2} (6,368/sq mi)
- Time zone: UTC+0 (GMT)

Fatick (French pronunciation: [fatik]; Wolof: Fatik; Serer: Fatik) is a town and urban commune in Senegal, located between M'bour and Kaolack and inhabited by the Serer people. Its 2023 population was at 39,361. It is the capital of the Fatick Region and the Fatick Department.

== Toponymy ==
Its name (Fatick), including its region and department take their names from one of the Serer maternal clans (Fatik)—which derives from the Serer term Fati Ubadik ("we have more to go"). The name is also spelled Patik following its pronunciation which is the same as the Fatik matriclan. The 15th century King of Sine Wasilla Faye named it after his father's matriclan. His father was a member of the Patik matriclan.

== History ==
The city has several ancient sites classified as historical monuments and added to the World heritage list. There is also the site of Mind Ngo Mindiss, located in the Sine River, where libations and offerings are made, the site of Ndiobaye, where traditional ceremonies takes place, and Ndeb Jab, which houses a sacred tree at Ndiaye-Ndiaye. These sites are sacred places in Serer religion. The Xooy ceremony (or Khoy), performed by the Serer high priests and priestesses (the Saltigues), takes place at Fatick once a year.

== Geography ==
Fatick is located "in the savanna belt of the West African Sahel, a sandy arid region south of the Sahara desert." The nearest towns are Nerane, Pourham, Mbirk Pourham and Tok. Dakar, the capital of Senegal, is located 155 km away.

== Climate ==
Under Köppen-Geiger climate classification system, it has a hot semi-arid climate (BSh).

Climate data for Fatick (1991–2020)
Month	Jan	Feb	Mar	Apr	May	Jun	Jul	Aug	Sep	Oct	Nov	Dec	Year
Mean daily maximum °C (°F)	34.2 (93.6)	36.3 (97.3)	38.4 (101.1)	39.3 (102.7)	38.8 (101.8)	36.7 (98.1)	34.5 (94.1)	33.1 (91.6)	33.1 (91.6)	35.5 (95.9)	36.7 (98.1)	34.8 (94.6)	36.0 (96.8)
Mean daily minimum °C (°F)	16.7 (62.1)	18.3 (64.9)	19.6 (67.3)	20.5 (68.9)	21.9 (71.4)	24.1 (75.4)	24.9 (76.8)	24.7 (76.5)	24.5 (76.1)	24.1 (75.4)	20.3 (68.5)	17.7 (63.9)	21.4 (70.5)
Record low °C (°F)	9.4 (48.9)	11.9 (53.4)	14.0 (57.2)	15.2 (59.4)	16.5 (61.7)	18.4 (65.1)	20.4 (68.7)	20.0 (68.0)	20.4 (68.7)	18.0 (64.4)	14.0 (57.2)	9.4 (48.9)	9.4 (48.9)
Average precipitation mm (inches)	2.0 (0.08)	1.1 (0.04)	0.1 (0.00)	0.0 (0.0)	0.4 (0.02)	24.6 (0.97)	116.0 (4.57)	239.8 (9.44)	177.7 (7.00)	41.4 (1.63)	0.4 (0.02)	1.1 (0.04)	604.6 (23.80)
Average precipitation days (≥ 1.0 mm)	0.1	0.2	0.1	0.0	0.1	1.6	7.1	12.6	11.2	3.5	0.2	0.1	36.8
Source: NOAA

== Population ==
In the censuses of 1988 and 2002, the estimate population figures were 18,416 and 23,149 respectively. In 2007, according to official estimates, the population was 24,855.

== Economy ==
Since the peanut trade is losing momentum, salt marshes are the main local resource.

== Twinning ==
Relationships exist with Montoir-de-Bretagne (Loire-Atlantique, France), through the René Guy Cadou middle school's “Club Sénégal” association, as well as with the association “Les Pirogues du Cœur,” which supports the elementary school in Sagne by reestablishing the school cafeteria two days a week and sending school supplies.

Mame Mélanie Loquais, born in Saint-Hilaire de Chaléons (Loire-Atlantique, France) in 1895, was a sister of the Catholic mission in Fatick who, from 1946 onwards, contributed to the creation of a school that still bears her name: the Mame Mélanie FATICK school. She died and has been buried in Fatick since 1996.

== Notable people from Fatick ==
- Macky Sall, former Prime Minister and former President of Senegal
- Chérif Ousmane Sarr, footballer
- Alioune Badara M'Bengue, politician
- Babacar Touré, businessman and journalist
