= Kingdom of Sine =

Post-classical Serer kingdom in Senegal

Kingdom of Sine Siin
- ca. 1335
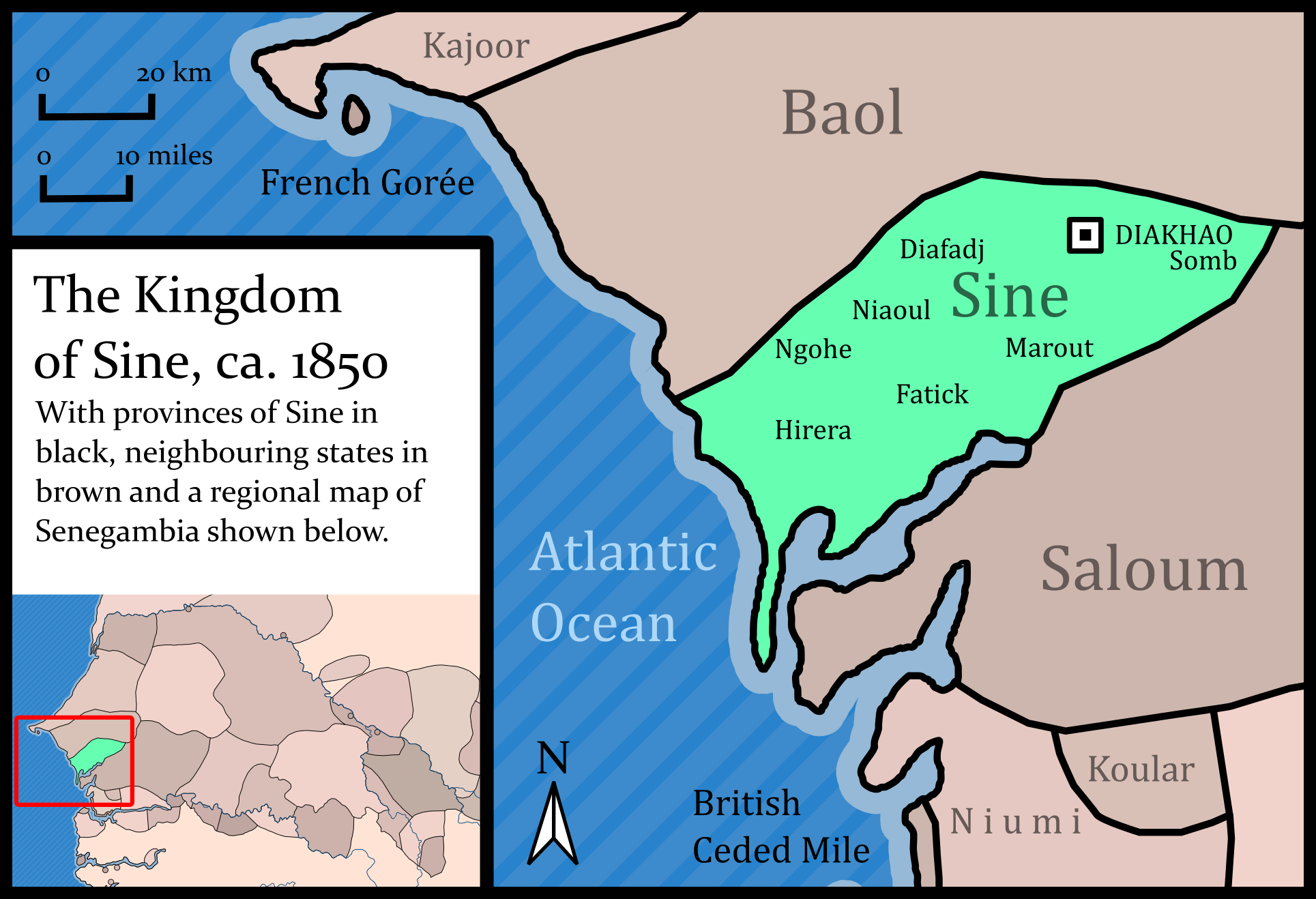
- Map of Sine (ca. 1850)
- Status: Non-sovereign monarchy within Senegal
- Capital: Diakhao
- Common languages: Serer
- Religion: Serer religion
- Government: Absolute monarchy, then traditional monarchy from 2019 – present
- Maad a Sinig, Lamane
- Historical era: Medieval
  - Established: ca. 1335
  - Abolition of the monarchy: 1969
  - Restoration of the monarchy: 2019

The Kingdom of Sine (or Siin in Serer, variations: Sin or Siine) was a post-classical Serer kingdom along the north bank of the Saloum River delta in modern Senegal.

== Toponymy and Demonym ==
During the Guelowar Era the region was named after Sine-o-Méo Manneh (Serer proper: Siin o Meo Maane), sister of Maysa Wali Manneh. The inhabitants are called Siin-Siin or Sine-Sine (a common structure for demonyms in Senegal, e.g. Bawol-Bawol and Saloum-Saloum / Saluum-Saluum, inhabitants of Baol and Saloum respectively).

Portuguese explorers in the 15th century referred to Sine as the kingdom of Barbaçim, a corruption of 'Bur-ba-Sine' (Wolof for 'King of Sine'), and its people as Barbacins (a term frequently extended by early writers to Serer people generally, while others insisted that Serreos and Barbacins were completely distinct peoples.) Old European maps frequently denote the Saloum River as the "River of Barbacins/Barbecins". Alvise Cadamosto, a 15th-century Venetian navigator, slave trader, and chronicler, mistakenly distinguished between the "Sereri" (Serer people) and the "Barbacini", which seems to indicate that he was referring to two different people when in fact, the Kingdom of Sine was a Serer Kingdom.

== History ==
The history of Sine, which has been inhabited by the Serer people for centuries, can be divided into three main periods.

- The Lamanic Era
- The Wagadou Era
- The Guelowar Era

=== Serer Exodus ===
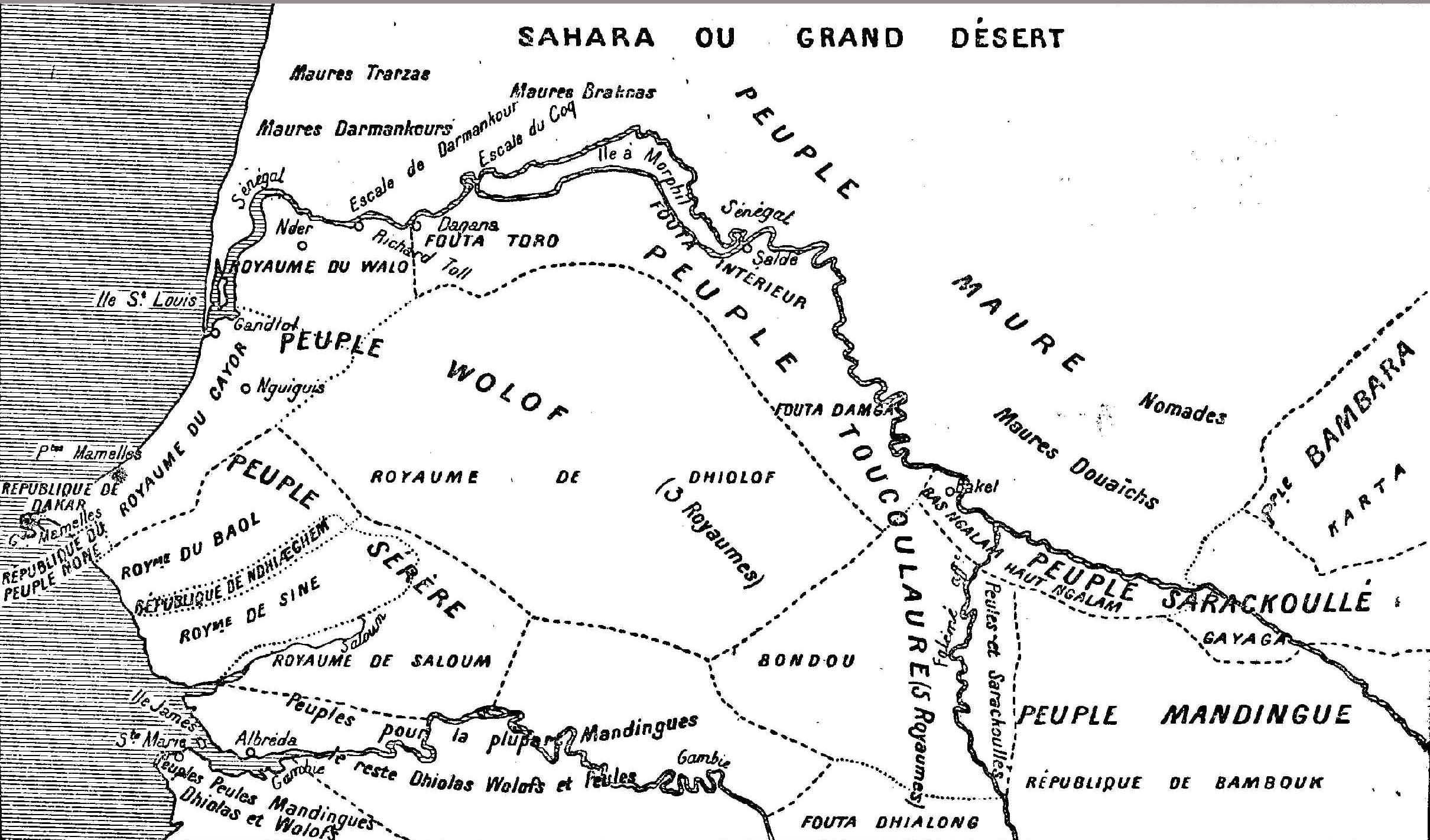
Carte des peuplades du Sénégal de l'abbé Boilat (1853): an ethnic map of Senegal at the time of French colonialism. The pre-colonial states of Baol, Sine and Saloum are arrayed along the southwest coast, with the inland areas marked "Peuple Sérère".

The diverse peoples grouped under the term Serer include the Serer Seex (pronounced Seh or Seeh), subgroups with various dialects of Serer proper, and the Cangin speaking Serers, all of whom historically have moved across Senegambia. According to historian Dennis Galvan, "The oral historical record, written accounts by early Arab and European explorers, and physical anthropological evidence suggest that the various Serer peoples migrated south from the Futa Tooro region (Senegal River valley) beginning around the eleventh century, when Islam first came across the Sahara."

King War Jabi of Takrur first instituted Sharia law and persecuted any of his subjects who refused to abandon their traditional beliefs in favour of Islam. In response, some began migrating south and west. Over generations these people, possibly Pulaar speaking herders originally, moved through Wolof areas and entered the Siin and Saluum river valleys. This lengthy period of Wolof-Serer contact has left historians unsure of the origins of shared "terminology, institutions, political structures, and practices." This migration was the process by which the Serer coalesced into a coherent ethnic group, separate from the Fula and the Wolof.

The lamanes, in particular, who were the guardians of Serer spirituality, leaders and the landowning class, put up a strong resistance to conversion partly to preserve their religion, but also to preserve their assets and power from the centralizing tendencies of the state. In some early Arab sources, the term lamlam became associated with "non-believers" in the region, which may have been a corruption of the Serer title Lamaan. In summarizing the influence of Serer culture, history, religion and tradition on the Senegambia region in his paper "Vestiges historiques, trémoins matériels du passé clans les pays Sereer" (1993), historian and author Professor Charles Becker writes that:

Finally we should remember the important relic call Sereer in Fouta, but also in the former countries of the Ferlo, Jolof and Kajoor, which marked the migration of proto-Sereer, whose imprint on the Fouta was so significant and remains in the memory of the Halpulaareen.

=== Lamanic Era ===
At the time of the Serer lamans, Sine was not called Sine. Instead, the roughly 60 villages were divided into states ruled by lamans, namely: Njafaj; Ña-UI; Joral; Ngohe-Pofin; Hiréna (west of Sine at the Petite Côte); and Singandum — which covers the two banks of the Sine valley.

Niokhobaye Diouf notes that, just before the Guelowar's arrival in Sine, there were three notable rulers using the Serer title laman:

- Lam Sango, sometimes called Diarno Diouala (or Jarno Jouala), residing in Palmarin
- Lam Diémé Fadial (or Lamaan Jame Faajaal), residing in Fadial (Faajaal in Serer)
- Lam Wal Satim Ndok, residing in Ndok (east of current Sine)

The Wagadou were century maternal dynasty of Soninke origin, descended from the Ghana Empire, that ruled much of modern-day Senegal by marrying into Serer lamanic families. Some of the notable Serer lamanic families included the Sarr family, the Joof family, the Ngom family, etc. These lamanic families formed a great council (the Great Council of Lamanes) to settle disputes. It was similar to a higher court where the lamanes sat to hear disputes brought in front of them so they could pass judgement. It was the last resort if a lamane from another part of Serer country could not decide on a case brought before him or the complainant was not satisfied with the judgment. This Council would elect one of their own as head of the Council.

=== Founding of Sine ===
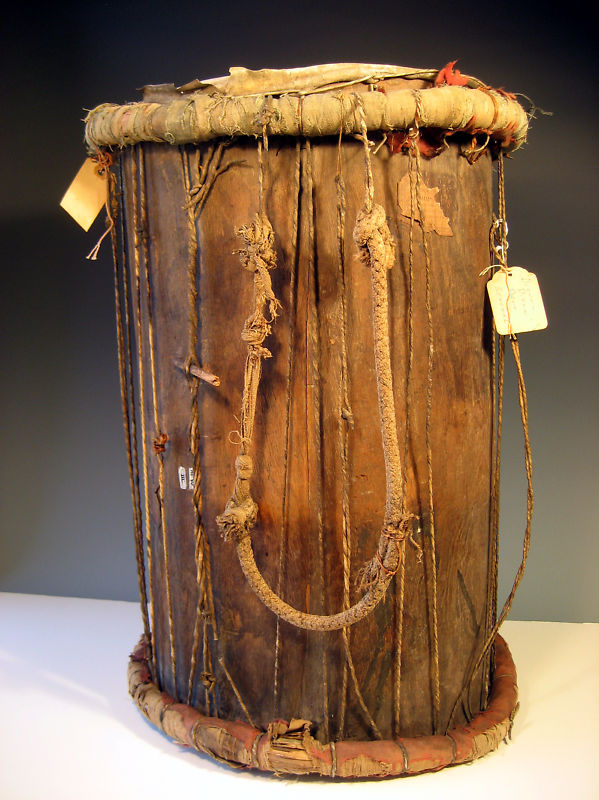
19th-century junjung from Sine.

The actual foundation date of the Kingdom of Sine is unclear, but in the 13th or 14th century Mandinka migrants entered the area from the southeast. They were led by a matrilineal clan known as the Gelwar. Father Henry Gravrand reports an oral tradition that one Maad a Sinig Maysa Wali Jaxateh Manneh fled with his family from Kaabu following a battle in 1335 which he calls the Battle of Troubang, "troubang" meaning "genocide"; "to wipe out"; or "to annihilate" a family, clan, or people. Charles Becker pointed out that Gravrand actually described the 1867 (or 1865) Battle of Kansala, although he as well as Senegalese historians Babacar Sedikh Diouf and Biram Ngom agree that the Guelowar dynasty, offshoots of the Ñaanco dynasty of Kaabu, had lost a dynastic struggle there, forcing them to seek refuge in Sine.

Near Niakhar, they encountered the Serer, the Council agreed to grant them asylum, and they joined to create a Gelwaar-led state with its capital at or near a lamanic estate at Mbissel. Under the Serer–Guelowar alliance, Serer men from the noble families of Sine and later Saloum, married Guelowar women and the offsprings of those unions ruled as kings. The children of such unions and their descendants identified as Serer, spoke the Serer language, and followed Serer religion and customs.

Serer oral history says that after Maysa Wali assimilated into Serer culture and served as legal advisor to the laman council of electors for atime, he was chosen by the lamans and people to rule. He served as King of Sine from c. 1350-1370. Lamaan Jame Ngom of Faajaal, a member of the Ngom family and head of the council, was the one who crowned Maysa Wali, and spoke the proclamation words or crowning speech to him so he could repeat it during his coronation ceremony. He was renowned for organising Serer wrestling tournaments in his country (Faajaal). It was through those tournaments that the patriarch of the Faye family, the "great Serer wrestler" Boukar Djillakh Faye demonstrated his skills and was given the hand of a princess in marriage.

The end of the Lamanic period led to a waning of the power and influence of the Lamanes, although the positions did not disappear. Lamanic families pre-Guelowar had real powers and wealth, were heads of their states, and were the custodians of Serer spirituality (A ƭat Roog). After the Guelowar they kept their wealth and titles but were merely provincial chiefs. However, due to their connection to Serer religion, they did maintain some power, and could dethrone a reigning monarch if threatened.

=== Under the Jolof Empire ===
According to legend, Maysa Wali elected the legendary Ndiadiane Ndiaye (Serer proper: Njaajaan Njaay) in c. 1360 as first Emperor of the Jolof Empire. He was the first king of modern Senegal to voluntarily gave his allegiance to Ndiadiane Ndiaye and asked others to do so, thereby making Sine a vassal of the Jolof Empire. Oral traditions hold that the Jolof Empire was not an empire founded by conquest, but through a voluntary confederacy of states. More likely, however, Jolof grew by a process of conquest. In some Serer dialects 'Njaajan Njaay' can be translated as 'catastrophe', indicating what impact his rule may have had on the Serer people.

Serer oral tradition says that Sine never paid tribute to Ndiadiane Ndiaye nor any of his descendants, that the Jolof Empire never subjugated the kingdom, and Ndiadiane Ndiaye himself received his name from the mouth of Maysa Waly. The historian Sylviane Diouf, however, states that "Each vassal kingdom—Walo, Takrur, Kayor, Baol, Sine, Salum, Wuli, and Niani—recognized the hegemony of Jolof and paid tribute."

The Serer Kingdoms of Sine and Saloum were the first to leave the Jolof Empire, at least twenty-nine years before the famous Battle of Danki in 1549, which saw the other kingdoms gained their independence from Jolof.

=== Middle Ages ===
Mbegane Ndour was the king of Sine around the turn of the 16th century (approx. 1495-1514). Lilyan Kesteloot and Anja Veirman advanced the claim that, Mbegane defeated the Takruri marabout Moussa Eli Bana Sall, who at that time reigned over Saloum, by poisoning him with a viper. The authors then went on to claim that, Mbegane Ndour was born of the matrilineal royal clan, but out of wedlock and with a relatively unimportant father. His marriage, they claim, with a princess and priestess of Baol propped up his legitimacy as well as helping him conquer Saloum.

=== 19th century and colonialism ===
Like most of their subjects in the 19th century, the Serer Kings of Sine and Saloum continued to follow Serer religion. On 18 July 1867, the prolific 19th century Senegalese Muslim cleric, jihadist, and slave trader Maba Diakhou Bâ was defeated at The Battle of Fandane-Thiouthioune fighting against the King of Sine Maad a Sinig Kumba Ndoffene fa Maak Joof when he tried to launch jihad in Sine, but failed. Maba and his allied forces suffered a severe defeat, and he was killed in that battle.

The rulers of Sine retained their title (Maad a Sinig) throughout the colonial period and did not lose official recognition until 1969 after the death of Maad a Sinig Mahecor Joof.

=== Post Colonialism ===
In 2019, the Serer people of Sine decided to reinstate their monarchy, and Maad a Sinig Niokhobaye Fatou Diène Diouf was crowned King of Sine (Maad a Sinig) on 8 February 2019 at Diakhao, the precolonial capital of Sine. He belongs to the Royal House of Semou Njekeh Joof via the branch of Maad a Sinig Semou Maak Joof, and a member of the Guelowar matrilineage through his mother Lingeer Fatou Diène. Since Sine is now part of independent Senegal, Niokhobaye Diouf is a traditional monarch with no official powers. His role is simply ceremonial and diplomatic. He does however, have influence and has been able to utilise the old pleasant cousinship between the Serer and Jola people by liaising with the King of Oussouye (Maan Sibiloumbaye Diédhiou) to help effect economic and cultural development, as well as bring about peace in Casamance, following decades long of the Casamance conflict.

== Economy ==
The economic base of Sine was agriculture and fishing. Millet and other crops were grown. Sine was very reluctant to grow groundnut for the French market, in spite of French colonial directives. It was less dependent on groundnut than other states. Deeply rooted in Serer conservatism and Serer religion, for several decades during the 19th century, the Serer farmers refused to grow it or when they did, they ensured that their farming cycle was not only limited to groundnut production. Their religious philosophy of preserving the ecosystem affected groundnut production in Sine. Even after mass production was later adopted, succession struggles in the late 19th century between the royal houses hampered production. However, the Kingdom of Sine was less susceptible to hunger and indebtedness, a legacy which continued right up to the last absolute monarch of Sine – Maad a Sinig Mahecor Joof. It was very common for people from other states to migrate to the Serer kingdoms of Sine and Saloum in search of a better life. The inhabitants of Sine (the "Sine-Sine") rarely migrated.

== Social organisation ==
Some of the king's government (or the political structure of Sine) include: the Lamanes (provincial chiefs and title holders, not to be confused with the ancient Serer Lamanes); the heir apparents such as the Buumi, Thilas and Loul (in that order); the Great Farba Kaba (chief of the army); the Farba Binda (minister of finance, the police and the royal palace) and the Great Jaraff (the king's advisor and head of the noble council of electors responsible for electing the kings from the royal family).

=== Political structure of Sine ===
The following list gives a condensed version of the political structure of Sine:

Maad a Sinig (king of Sine)

- Heir apparent
  - Buumi
  - Thilas
  - Loul
- Central hierarchy
  - Great Jaraaf (head of the noble council responsible for electing kings; he is the equivalent of prime minister)
  - Great Farba Kaba (chief commander of the army)
  - Farba mbinda (minister of finance)
  - Lingeer (queen regnant/queen mother, head of the female court)—equivalent of minister for women, also judge cases relating to women))
- Royal entourage
  - Paar no Maad (the chief griot of the king, who was very powerful and influential, usually very rich/financially well off due to their profession, knowledge, and master of speech), in Wolof kingdoms, they are referred to as buur geweel))
  - Family
- Territorial command (the title holders)
  - Lamane (holders of noble title and land)—they are the descendants of the ancient Serer lamaans (the lamanic families))

== See also ==
- Serer people
- Kingdom of Saloum
- Biffeche
- History of Senegal

== Sources ==
- Becker, Charles (1993). Vestiges historiques, témoins matériels du passé dans les pays sereer. Dakar: CNRS.
- Chavane, Bruno (1985). Villages de l'ancien Tekrour. Paris: Karthala Editions. ISBN 2-86537-143-3.
- Diouf, Niokhobaye (1972). "Chronique du royaume du Sine". Bulletin de l'IFAN. 34 (B).
- Galvan, Dennis (2004). The State Must Be Our Master of Fire: How Peasants Craft Culturally Sustainable Development in Senegal. Berkeley: University of California Press.
- Gravrand, Henri (1983). La Civilisation Sereer: Cosaan, Les Origines. Dakar: Nouvelles Editions Africaines. ISBN 2-7236-0877-8.
- Gravrand, Henri (1990). La Civilisation Sereer – Pangool. Dakar: Nouvelles Editions Africaines. ISBN 2-7236-1055-1.
- Klein, Martin (1968). Islam and Imperialism in Senegal Sine-Saloum, 1847–1914. Stanford University Press. ISBN 978-0804706216.
- Ngom, Biram (1987). La question Gelwaar et l'histoire du Siin. Dakar: Universite de Dakar.
- Phillips, Lucie Colvin (1981). Historical Dictionary of Senegal (1st ed.). Meuchen, NJ: Scarecrow Press.
- Sarr, Alioune (1986). "Histoire du Sine-Saloum". Bulletin de l'IFAN. 46 (3–4).
- Thiaw, Ibrahima (2013). "From the Senegal River to Siin: The Archaeology of Sereer Migrations in North-Western Senegambia.". In Bosma, Ulbe; Kessler, Gijs; Lucassen, Leo (eds.). Migration and Membership Regimes in Global and Historical Perspective: An Introduction Studies in Global Migration History. Brill. ISBN 978-9004241831.
