= Fatick region =

Region of Senegal

Fatick region Région de Fatick (French) Diiwaanu Fatik (Wolof)
- Region
- Location of Fatick in Senegal

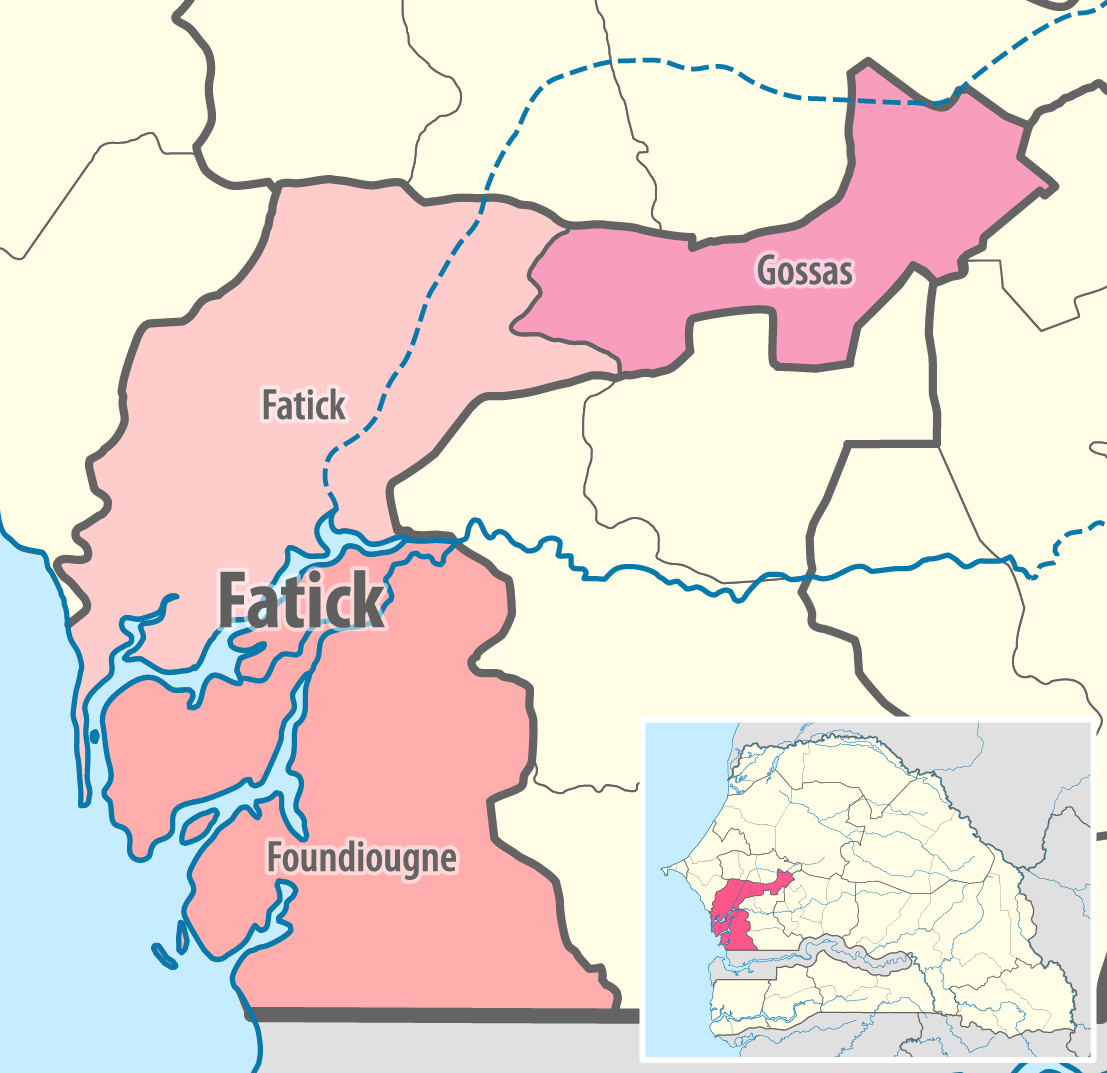
- Fatick région, divided into 3 départements
- Coordinates: 14°22′N 16°08′W
- Country: Senegal
- Capital: Fatick
- Départements: List: Fatick; Foundiougne; Gossas

Area
  - Total: 6,849 km^{2} (2,644 sq mi)

Population (2023 census)
  - Total: 908,858
  - Density: 132.7/km^{2} (343.7/sq mi)
- Time zone: UTC+0 (GMT)
- HDI (2021): 0.503 low · 4th

Fatick is the southwest region of the northern outcrop of Senegal. Its alternative name is Jinnak Bolon. The region is named for its capital city, Fatick.

== History ==
The area is rich with Serer ancient and medieval history. Many of the ancient Serer sites are found within this region. It is also one of the holy places in the Serer religion. The Xooy Ceremony (or Khoy), a divination festival by the Serer priestly class (the Saltigues) is held within this region once a year. The population is overrun by the Serer people. Historically, it was part of the Serer pre-colonial Kingdom of Sine. In 1859, the Battle of Logandème took place within this region. It was a battle of resistance by the Siin-Siin (Serer people of Sine) against French colonialism. It is called in some French scholarly works as the Battle of Fatick.

== Departments ==
Fatick region is divided into 3 departments :

- Fatick département
- Foundiougne département
- Gossas département
