= Persecution of Serers =

Religious and ethnic persecution of the Serer people of West Africa

The Persecution of Serers is multifaceted and includes both ethnic and religious persecution of the Serer people of Senegal, the Gambia, and Mauritania, first, by Muslims, and later by Christians. The persecution of the Serer people can be reliably traced back to the 11th century, continuing from the medieval and European colonial era, to the 19th century, and resulting in the Battle of Logandème (against French colonialism), and the Battle of Fandane-Thiouthioune (against the Muslim jihads). Since the 20th century, the persecution of the Serers has been less visible; they are still the "objects of scorn and prejudice."

== By Muslims ==
The religious and ethnic persecution of the Serer people dates back to the 11th century, when King War Jabi usurped the throne of Tekrur (part of present-day Senegal) in 1030, and in 1035, introduced Sharia law and forced his subjects to submit to Islam. With the assistance of his son Leb, their Almoravid allies and other African ethnic groups who had embraced Islam, the Muslim coalition army launched jihads against the Serer people of Tekrur because they refused to abandon their Serer religion in favour of Islam.

The Serer lamanic class, who also acted as the priestly class and guardians of Serer religion, are believed to have been at the forefront of resisting Islamization, partly to preserve their religion, and also their power and wealth as landowners. It was common for early Arab writers such as Al Bakri to refer to "non-believers" of Islam in their works as lamlam, lemlem, or damdam which may be a corruption of the Serer title lamaan. The persecution of the Serers in the 11th century led to their first generally accepted exodus from Tekrur, moving southwards. The number of Serers who were killed is unknown, and the defeat of the Serers at Tekrur triggered their exodus from Tekrur to the south, where they were granted asylum by the Serer lamanes in the south. The Serer people are very diverse and the Serer Exodus from Tekruk only affected the Serers living in Tekrur at the time. The Tanzanians historian and author Godfrey Mwakikagile notes that: "...the Serer traversed vast expanses of territory during pre-colonial times and saw the entire region as their home, as their history of migration in the area clearly shows..."

In the 13th century, a civil war broke out in Tekrur. The descendants of the Serers who chose to remain in Tekrur during the first Serer Exodus decided to migrate southwest, first to the Ferlo, and then to Siin and Saloum rather than be converted to Islam. Ibrahima Thiaw advanced the claim that, this was the process by which a distinct 'Serer' identity first emerged, separate from the rest of the Takruri population. Professor Issa Laye Thiaw, Professor Cheikh Anta Diop, the 18th century French archaeologist Paul Pierret, and Professor Molefi Kete Asante et al. amongst other historians posits that the name 'Serer' is sacred and pre-Islamic, leading Asante et al. to conclude that, "they are an ancient people whose history reaches deep into the past..." and that would be consistent with their "strong connection to their ancient religious past".

The persecution of the Serer people continued from the medieval era to the 19th century, resulting in the Battle of Fandane-Thiouthioune where the Serers defeated the ally Muslim forces of the 19th century Senegambian jihadist, Muslim cleric and slave trader, Maba Diakhou Bâ. Since the 20th century, the persecution of the Serers has been less visible though the object of "scorn and prejudice."

== By Christians ==
The Serer people have a somewhat recent contact with Christianity compared to Islam which they vehemently and violently resisted for almost a thousand years, since the 11th century. Serer contact with Christianity came via the Atlantic slave trade and European colonialism. Thus, Christian persecution of Serers who adhere to Serer spirituality (A ƭat Roog), was multi-faceted, and mainly motivated by European colonialists' greed and attempts to dehumanise the Serer. Many early European writers (and some modern writers), some of whom never entered Serer country, relied on information received from their Wolof translators, have works filled with anti-Serer sentiments including, and not limited to, viewing the Serer people as wicked; "idolaters of great cruelty"; pagans; evil; people without kings; unwelcoming; uncivilised; always sticking together; hostile; and not open to other cultures; etc.. French colonialists preferred Islam over Serer spirituality, especially when the Serer kings refused them permission to own land in Serer country or build Christian missions in brick masonry.

The earliest contact with European Christians was during the 15th century. In 1446, the Portuguese slave raider Nuno Tristão tried and failed to launch a slave raiding expedition with his Portuguese party in Serer territory. They all succumbed to Serer poisoned arrows except five young Portuguese (some sources say less). One of them was left to charter their caravel back to Portugal. Nuno was amongst those killed by the Serers for attempting slave raiding in Serer country.

In 1455, the Venetian slave trader, chronicler, and navigator Alvise Cadamosto parked his caravel in the water and sent his Wolof translator to the Serer community on shore―who stood guard looking menacing, to negotiate slave buying terms. Serer religion and culture forbids slavery. The Wolof interpreter was brutally killed on the spot by the Serer people on guard for bringing European slave traders into their community. Cadamosto and his Portuguese party on board who witnessed the murder did not come out of the ship; he ordered the ship to be turned around, and headed towards the Gambia.

Cadamosto never set foot in Serer country. He failed to realise that he was approaching Serer country, and what was acceptable in Wolof country was not necessarily acceptable in Serer country who did not practice a slave culture due to their religious beliefs or at least not to the same extent as other groups, and each tribe have their own customs and traditions, as well as languages. He also failed to realise that the Serer people on the border of Wolof and Serer country viewed the Wolof as ardent enemies for their slave raiding and slave trading slaves activities with Europeans.

The Serer Cangin people (a subgroup of the Serer) viewed the Wolof as the agents of Portuguese slave traders, and their own community the victims of Wolof slave raiding. The Portuguese saw the Wolof as more agreeable and had a better slave trading relationship with them than with the Serer, whom they viewed as hostile.

Michał Tymowski said that:

"The Wolof were just as determined as the Portuguese to ensure smooth and efficient trade."

Without ever setting foot in Serer country Cadamosto corrupted the name of the Kingdom of Sine (one of the Serer Kingdoms) by referring to it as the Kingdom of Barbaçim , and the Serer people of Sine as Barbacins among other names which many Europeans of that era referred to the Serer people as in their old maps. Since neither Cadamosto nor any of his party ever stepped in Serer country, historians believe that his negative opinions about the Serer were coming from his Wolof interpreters. The Wolofs of Cayor were in constant war with the Serer community living on their border and were fearful of the Serers (the Serer Cangin people to be exact), as detailed by Cadamosto in his writings. In Robert Kerr's "A general history of voyages and travels to the end of the 18th century", Cadamosto refer to the Serers as without kings. However, these Serers were those living on the Wolof Cayor border and refused to submit to the Wolof kings of Cayor. Alvise did not know that the Kingdom of Sine was actually a Serer kingdom, where the Serer King of Sine, whom he called "Barbacini" – (a corruption of the Wolof "Bur Ba Sine" which means king of Sine, "Maad a Sinig" in Serer) took residence.

In 1678, the Serer communities of Sine and Baol (an old Serer kingdom prior to the Battle of Danki in 1549) refused to welcome the French merchants that had settled on the Petite Côte, and voiced their grievances to their respective kings (the Maad a Sinig, king of Sine; and the Teigne, king of Baol). The Maad a Sinig and Teigne with their respective armies sacked the French post. The French, under the command of Admiral Jean-Baptiste du Casse, launched a revenge attack the following year and defeated them.

On 13 May 1859, the Serer people of Sine under Maad a Sinig Kumba Ndoffene fa Maak Joof declared war against the French, for France's attempts to revoke all previously agreed treaties which the French no longer viewed as to their advantage, especially in relation to land and building missions in brick, and tried to exercise their wishes without the authority of the Serer King, Kumba Ndoffene fa Maak Joof. At the Battle of Djilas (13 May 1859), the Serers defeated the French, and France suffered a humiliating defeat and lost many soldiers on the battlefield. As reprisals for their defeat at Djilas, France declared war against the Serers of Sine. The Serer people, a very small community, faced the French colonial empire at the Battle of Logandème that same year, also known as the "Battle of Fatick" in some French sources, when France brought in more army personnel from its empire, including soldiers from North Africa (Algeria), and the Wolof and Lebou ethnic group whom governor Louis Faidherbe of France recruited. In a letter sent to Paris, Faidherbe detailed how he managed to recruit Wolofs and the Lebous to join the French army against their Serer neighbours, as follows:

"I told them that they were French, and that for this reason they had to take arms to join us and had to participate in the expedition that we are going to make against their neighbours to obtain reparations for wrongs those people [the Serer people] had done to us."

The Serer army, under the command of King Kumba Ndoffene fa Maak Joof (French variation: Coumba N'Doffène famack Diouf), put up a strong resistance against the French Empire. They were no match for the mighty French Empire and French weaponry, and suffered a severe defeat. It was at Logandème that France, for the first time, decided to employ cannonball on Senegambian soil, and possibly in Africa. According to French reports, 150 Serer-Sine men were "either killed or wounded, but that the French force had only five wounded." After the French victory, governor Louis Faidherbe ordered his men to burn Fatick and the surrounding villages to the ground. The Fatick, as well as the Thiès regions are two of the holiest places in Serer religion. Fatick is where the annual Xooy ceremony is held. Thiès is where the ancient village of Yaboyabo is located. The village is believed to be the custodian of an ancient Serer relic whose narrative is preserved in the Serer creation myth.

In 1861, the Serer elder and Chief of Gorom, Jogomay Tine (or Diogomay Tine) of Gorom was displeased when the Wolof King of Cayor, Damel Majojo Faal (the French-backed puppet king of Cayor) conceded his province to the French governor Louis Faidherbe. Damel-Teigne Lat Joor Ngoneh Latir Jobe who had now form good relations with the French was invited by the French to occupy the region including Jogomay Tine's province. Majojo was declared too incompetent by the French. Jogomay Tine refused to submit to neither Lat Joor nor the French, and refused to authorise the Serer population of his province to take part in the 1863 census. In April 1863, French governor Émile Pinet-Laprade authorised the French forces to enter his province. Jogomay Tine was killed by the gun shot. Eight years later in August 1871, the King of Sine, Kumba Ndoffene fa Maak Joof from the Royal House of Semou Njekeh Joof, went to Joal (one of his provinces) accompanied by a small entourage rather than his army, to assert his authority over Joal, which the French previously took illegally. He was assassinated in Joal by the French. The French claimed they never gave the order to assassinate the King, and laid the blame on a French drunkard merchant called Baccaria. None of the credible historians believe them, and the consensus is the assassination of the King was a French directive. Historian and author, Professor Martin A. Klein notes that:

"The French treated Coumba N'Doffène's visit as another example of tyeddo [animist/pagan] thievery, but it is more likely that it was another attempt by the Bur [King] to show the French that he could be a valuable friend or a potent enemy. Coumba N'Doffène's demand was simple: clear recognition of the Bur's supremacy within Sine."

Prior to the Battle of Fandane-Thiouthioune on 18 July 1867, the Senegambian jihadist, Maba Diakhou Bâ was able to go to British Gambia to stock up on arms in preparation for the upcoming jihad against the Serer people of Sine. The Serer King of Sine, Maad a Sinig Kumba Ndoffene fa Maak Joof, was however refused permission to buy arm, and blocked by the French from going through Joal, his only route to Gambia, to buy arms from the British in order to defend his people and country from the Muslim jihadists. Despite the severe handicap in acquiring arms, the King of Sine, the warriors of Sine, and their only ally, the Serer Kingdom of Saloum, won the battle by sheer military strategy.

== Legacy ==
The Senegambia region where the Serers are found includes the modern countries of Senegal, Gambia and Mauritania, all which are predominantly Muslim countries. Thus, scholars agree pretty much that the Islamic religion has more of an adverse impact on the Serer than any other religion. In that regard, Professor Klein, writing in 1968 notes that: "The most important factor dividing the peoples of Senegambia was the differential impact of Islam. In this, the Serer stood out as the one group that had undergone no conversion." This division is not just religious, but also has ethnic elements. In his paper La Religiosité des Sereer, Avant et Pendant Leur Islamisation (1991), Professor Issa Laye Thiaw posits that, "Islam has divided African communities into believers and non believers." One of the most decisive and well-known religious battles on Senegambian soil was the Battle of Fandane-Thiouthioune between the Muslims, led by the Muslim cleric Maba Diakhou Bâ–aided by the Kingdom of Jolof and Cayor, against the Serers of Sine (aided by the Serer Kingdom of Saloum). It was in that battle were Maba was defeated by the Maad a Sinig, Kumba Ndoffene Famak Joof, and Maba killed. In view of the legacy of this historic battle, Iba Der Thiam writes:

"Maba Diakhou, the fighter of the faith died in the land of Sine without ever managing to Islamize the country deeply rooted in centuries old belief. The glorious epic of Islam in the land of Senegambia did not spread to Ceddo [Animist] Sine, who were determined to reject forever the religion that threatened the faith of their forefathers and to rule their lives in defiance of their customs. The Sine is an impregnable bastion of the anti-Islamic."

On the subject of how Serer culture and traditions managed to survive throughout the centuries despite attempts by others to destroy it, historian Godfrey Mwakikagile writes:

"Today, the Serer retain much of their old culture, customs and traditions. In fact, it's not uncommon to hear how Serer culture has survived through the centuries in spite of all the forces which tried to destroy it."

== See also ==
- Persecution of traditional African religions
- Persecution of Dogons

== Bibliography ==
- Abbey, M T Rosalie Akouele, "Customary Law and Slavery in West Africa", Trafford Publishing (2011), pp. 481–482, ISBN 1-4269-7117-6
- Mwakikagile, Godfrey, "Ethnic Diversity and Integration in The Gambia: The Land, The People and The Culture," (2010), pp. 11, 224, 241, ISBN 9987-9322-2-3
- Clark, Andrew F., & Phillips, Lucie Colvin, "Historical Dictionary of Senegal". ed: 2, Metuchen, New Jersey : Scrarecrow Press (1994) p. 265
- Page, Willie F., "Encyclopedia of African history and culture: African kingdoms (500 to 1500)", pp. 209, 676. Vol.2, Facts on File (2001), ISBN 0-8160-4472-4
- Streissguth, Thomas, "Senegal in Pictures, Visual Geography", Second Series, p. 23, Twenty-First Century Books (2009), ISBN 1-57505-951-7
- Oliver, Roland Anthony, Fage, J. D., "Journal of African history", Volume 10, p. 367. Cambridge University Press (1969)
- Chavane, Bruno A., "Villages de l’ancien Tekrour", Vol. 2, Hommes et sociétés. Archéologies africaines, KARTHALA Editions (1985), p. 38, ISBN 2-86537-143-3
- Diop, Abdoulaye Bara, "Le tenure foncière en milieu rural Wolof (Sénégal): Historique et actualité." Notes Africaines, no. 118, (April 1968), IFAN, Dakar, pp. 48–52
- Mwakikagile, Godfrey, "The Gambia and Its People: Ethnic Identities and Cultural Integration in Africa", p 136 -138, (2010), ISBN 9987-16-023-9
- Klein, Martin (1968). "Islam and Imperialism in Senegal Sine-Saloum, 1847–1914." Edinburgh University Press, pp, 7, 46, 55-59, 63, 73, 88-89, 94, 106-9, 130, ISBN 0-85224-029-5
- Gravrand, Henry, La Civilisation sereer: Cossan, vol. 1. pp 115–18
- Gravrand, Henry, La civilisation Sereer: Pangool, vol. 2, p. 13
- Gravrand, Henry, "La Civilisation Sereer: Pangool." Vol. 2. Les Nouvelles Editions Africaines du Senegal (1990), pp. 13, 205-8, ISBN 2-7236-1055-1
- Colvin, Lucie Gallistel, "Historical dictionary of Senegal, Scare Crow Press Inc. (1981), p. 18, ISBN 0-8108-1369-6
- Kane, Oumar (2004). "La première hégémonie peule. Le Fuuta Tooro de Koli Teηella à Almaami Abdul." Paris: Karthala. . Retrieved 29 March 2025.
- Thiaw, Ibrahima (2013). "From the Senegal River to Siin: The Archaeology of Sereer Migrations in North-Western Senegambia.". In Bosma, Ulbe; Kessler, Gijs; Lucassen, Leo (eds.). Migration and Membership Regimes in Global and Historical Perspective: An Introduction Studies in Global Migration History. Brill. ISBN 978-9004241831
- Thiaw, Issa Laye, La Religiosité des Sereer, avant et pendant leur Islamisation. Éthiopiques, No: 54, Revue Semestrielle de Culture Négro-Africaine. Nouvelle Série, Volume 7, 2e Semestre (1991).
- Pierret, Paul, "Dictionnaire d'archéologie égyptienne", Imprimerie nationale (1875), p. 198-199
- Pierret, Paul, "Dictionnaire d'archéologie égyptienne", Imprimerie nationale 1875, p. 198-199 [in] Diop, Cheikh Anta, "Precolonial Black Africa." (translated by Harold Salemson), Chicago Review Press (1988), p. 65
- Asante, Molefi Kete; Mazama, Ama; Encyclopedia of African Religion, SAGE Publications (2008), p. 606-7 ISBN 9781506317861 (retrieved 29 March 2025)
- Hopkins, J. F. P., & Levtzion, Nehemia, "Corpus of Early Arabic Sources for West African History", pp 77–79, Cambridge University Press (1981)
- Trimingham, John Spencer, "A history of Islam in West Africa", pp 174, 176 & 234, Oxford University Press, USA (1970)
- Tymowski, Michał, "Europeans and Africans: Mutual Discoveries and First Encounters." BRILL (2020), pp. 70-72, ISBN 9789004428508 (retrieved 29 March 2025)
- Kerr, Robert, "A general history of voyages and travels to the end of the 18th century", pp. 238–240, J. Ballantyne & Co. (1811) [in] Verrier, Frédérique, "Introduction. Voyages en Afrique noire d'Alvise Ca'da Mosto (1455 & 1456)", p. 136, Chandeigne, Paris, (1994), [in] Russell, Peter E., "Prince Henry 'the Navigator : A life." New Haven, Conn: Yale University Press (2000), pp. 299–300
- Diouf, Cheikh, "Fiscalité et Domination Coloniale: l'exemple du Sine: 1859-1940", Université Cheikh Anta Diop de Dakar (2005)
- Hair, Paul Edward Hedley, "The Use of African Languages in Afro-European contacts in Guinea : 1440-1560", [in] "Sierra Leone Language Review", no. 5, 1966, p. 13
- Hair, Paul Edward Hedley, "Africa encountered: European contacts and evidence, 1450-1700", Variorum (1997), pp. 213-15 & 248, ISBN 0-86078-626-9
- Richard, François G., "Recharting Atlantic encounters. Object trajectories and histories of value in the Siin (Senegal) and Senegambia." Archaeological Dialogues 17(1) 1–27. Cambridge University Press (2010)
- Hall, Trevor P., "Before Middle Passage: Translated Portuguese Manuscripts of Atlantic Slave Trading from West Africa to Iberian Territories, 1513-26." Routledge (2016), p. 22-23, ISBN 9781317175728 (accessed 29 March 2025)
- Boulègue, Jean, "Le Grand Jolof, (XVIIIe – XVIe Siècle)", (Paris, Edition Façades), Karthala (1987), p. 16.
- Ndiaye, Ousmane Sémou, "Diversité et unicité Sérères: L'exemple de la Région de Thiès", Ethiopiques, n°54, revue semestrielle de culture négro-africaine, Nouvelle série volume 7, 2e semestre (1991)
- Sarr, Alioune, "Histoire du Sine-Saloum", (Introduction, bibliographie et Notes par Charles Becker), Bulletin de Institut Fondamental d'Afrique Noire, Tome 46, Serie B, n° 3-4, 1986–1987, pp. 37-39
