= Lambaye =

- Town and commune
- Location in Senegal
- Coordinates: 14.80132°N 16.53391°W
- Country: Senegal
- Region: Diourbel Region
- Department: Bambey
- Arrondissement: Lambaye

Area
  - Town and commune: 144.5 km^{2} (55.8 sq mi)

Population (2023 census)
  - Town and commune: 30,486
  - Density: 211.0/km^{2} (546.4/sq mi)
- Time zone: UTC+0 (GMT)

Lambaye is a town and commune located in the Diourbel Region of Senegal, capital of the eponymous Arrondissement.

== History ==
Lambaye was the capital of the Kingdom of Baol. During the period when Baol was a part of the Jolof Empire, some of the Buurbas used it as their seat, since their maternal lines were from Baol.

During the Marabout War of the late 17th century, Lambaye was attacked by Muslim troops under Ndiaye Sall, who defeated and killed the Damel-Teigne Mafaly Gueye there and burned the town.
