= Bambey department =

Coordinates: 14°43′12″N 16°36′41″W

Bambey
- Department
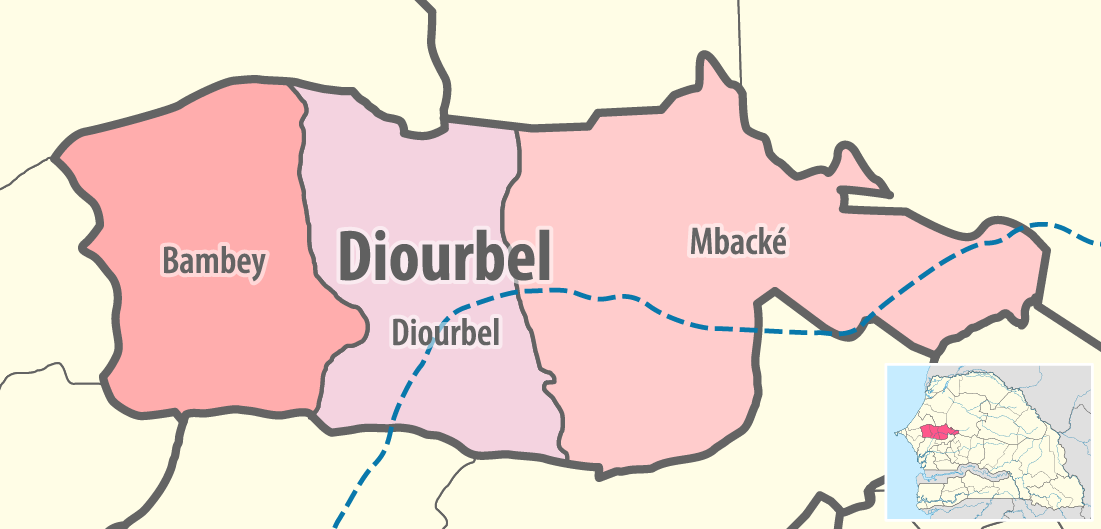
- Location in the Diourbel Region
- Country: Senegal
- Region: Diourbel Region
- Capital: Bambey

Area
  - Total: 1,351 km^{2} (522 sq mi)

Population (2023 census)
  - Total: 376,945
  - Density: 279.0/km^{2} (722.6/sq mi)
- Time zone: UTC+0 (GMT)

Bambey department is one of the 46 departments of Senegal, one of the three making up the Diourbel region.

Its capital and the only commune in the department is Bambey.

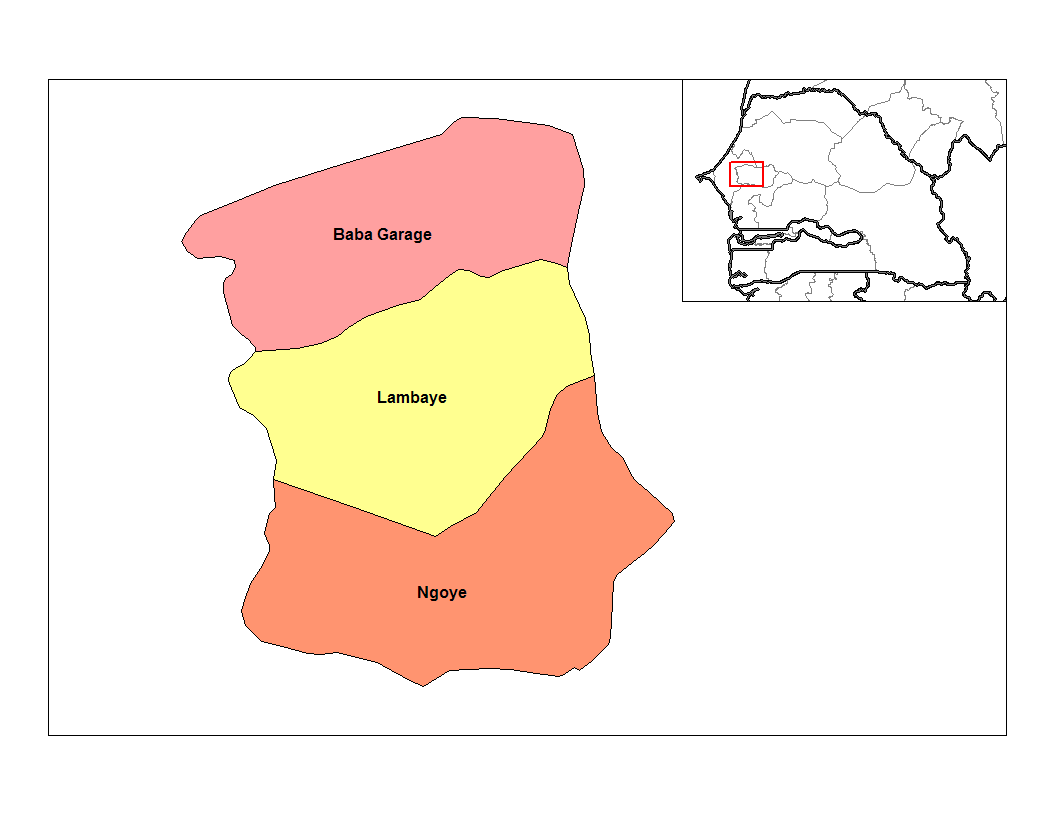
Map of the department arrondissements

The rural districts (communautés rurales) are:

- Baba Garage Arrondissement:
  - Baba Garage
  - Dinguiraye
  - Keur Samba Kane
- Lambaye Arrondissement:
  - Gawane
  - Lambaye
  - Ngogom
  - Réfane
- Ngoye Arrondissement:
  - N'Dangalma
  - N'Dondol
  - N'goye
  - Thiakhar

Historic sites

- Tumuli of Lambaye (tombs of the Teignes of Baol)
- Tène-Mbambey, battlefield at Mbambey Sérère
- Gouye Ndeung, baobab tree on the site of the Battle of Sanghay at Lambaye
- Battlefield at Sanghay-Mbol
- Site of battle of Ndiarème, near Sindiane
- Mausoleum of Cheikh Anta Diop at Thieytou, Dinguiraye
- Tumulus of Pouniar, Lambaye Arrondissement
- Tumulus of Gallo Peye, Ndangalma
- Tumulus of Peul Lamassas, Ndangalma
