= Lat Sukaabe Fall =

Lat Sukaabe Ngone Fall
- Teigne
- Reign: 1693-1719
- Predecessor: Thié Yasin Demba Noudj
- Successor: Makodou Koumba Diaring

Lat Sukaabe Fall
- Damel
- Reign: 1697-1719
- Predecessor: Déthialao Bassin Sow
- Successor: Maissa Teindé Wedj
- Born: Lambaye, Baol
- Spouse: Koumba Diaring, Issa Teindé, Ndoumbé Ndella Dieye, Ngoné Ndella Dieye, Koura Kondiogo, Yasin Kondiogou, Awa Sambe, Mbatio Sambe
- Issue: Thié Koumba, Mali Koumba Tègne, Kodou Koumba, Ndella Koumba, Ngoné Latir, Maissa Teindé Wedj Damel, Fatim Penda, Yasin Issa, Mawa Mbatio Sambe
- House: Geej
- Father: Thié Yasin Demba Noudj Fall
- Mother: Ngoné Dièye
- Religion: Islam

Lat Sukaabe Ngone Jey Fall, sometimes spelled Lat Sukabe or Lat Soucabe (or Lat Sukabe Ngoneh Jaye Faal), was Damel-Teigne of the pre-colonial kingdoms of Cayor and Baol in what is now Senegal in the late 17th and early 18th centuries.

== Background ==
Lat Sukaabe was born a younger son of the Teigne of Baol, Thié Yasin Demba Noudj Fall, and Ngoné Dièye of the Gej or Guedj matrilineal clan. Keur Thie Yasin was a minor branch of the Fall dynasty that had dominated Cayor since Amary Ngone Fall had won the kingdom's independence from the Jolof Empire at the Battle of Danki in 1550.

Beginning in the 1670s the Tubenan movement, a multi-national uprising of Muslim marabouts, had severely destabilized the traditionalist kingdoms of present-day Senegal ruled by the ceddo kings and their slave warriors. Cayor in particular had seen a series of civil conflicts and assassinations, as well as the armed intervention of the Bour Saloum, that had weakened the aristocracy.

== Rule ==
Upon Thie Yasin's death, Lat Sukaabe fought for his older half-brothers Lat Kodou and Biram Kodou when they claimed the throne. They were wounded in the conflict, however, leaving Lat Sukaabe as regent during the convalescence. He plied the nobles of the kingdom with gifts, securing their support, such that when his brothers came to reassert their right to rule, he dismissed them, later killing them when they began to gather forces to resist. He was officially elected Teigne shortly afterwards. At the battle of Nganiane, he defeated the Buur of the Kingdom of Sine, expanding his lands to the southeast. He further strengthened his army by purchasing 300 muskets from European traders as Mbour. The nobility of Cayor, seeing Fall's growing power, invited him to balance out the Buur Saloum's power, and he soon usurped the throne there as well.

Lat Sukaabe powerfully centralized royal power through a variety of means. Rather than fight the Muslims, he gave marabouts prominent government positions and responsibility for the defense of the frontiers, as well as contracting marriage alliances, aligning a potential threat to ceddo power with the throne and driving a wedge between those who accepted to be bought and those who refused to compromise with a king who was a nominal Muslim at best. Nevertheless, Lat Sukaabe did confront a Muslim rebellion in the Ndiambour province, aided by the Emir of Trarza and Muslims from Waalo. He crushed them at the battle of Ngangaram, where the waajor forces were led by Ngone Latir Fall, Latsukaabe's eldest daughter, while her father was sick.

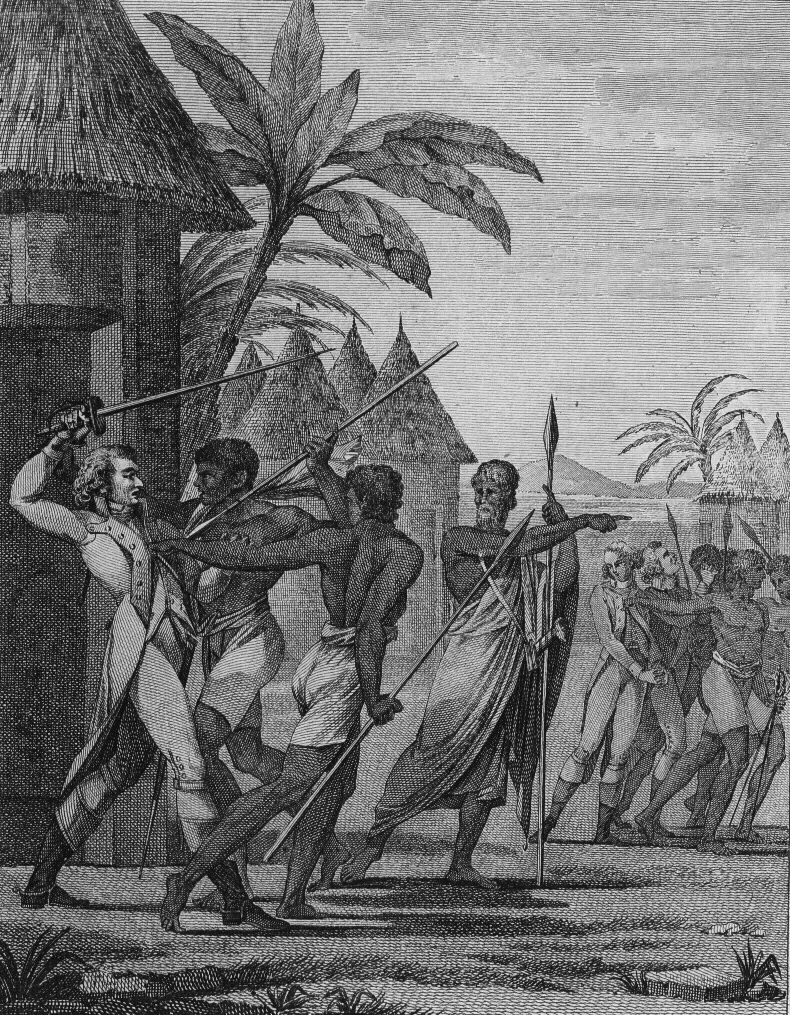
Arrest of the French Director-General Andre Brue.

Lat Sukaabe had an often turbulent relationship with the French, who were important trading partners based on the island of Goree. As the ruler of nearly the entire coast between Saint-Louis and the Saloum Delta, he believed that he could impose his terms on the Europeans. The French, meanwhile, were attempting to enforce a trading monopoly against the Damel-Teigne's wishes and reduce customs payments. His mother Lingeer Ngoné Dièye sometimes served as an intermediary between them. In 1699, after the French captured a British ship attempting to trade in Cayor, Lat Sukaabe ordered a commercial blockade. In 1701 he captured and imprisoned the Director-General of the Compagnie du Senegal, Andre Brue, and even sacked Goree.

He tried and failed to bring under his control the Lebu people of the Cap-Vert peninsula, who profited handsomely from both trade and rent the French paid for Goree.

== Legacy ==
At his death, Lat Sukaabe left Cayor to his eldest son, Maissa Teindé Wedj, whose mother was waajor, and Baol to a son by a Baol-Baol wife. Without his leadership, conflict between the two sister kingdoms immediately resumed. The French, having learned how inconvenient it could be to have Cayor and Baol united, continually interfered to keep them apart. The constant wars between them provided both a consistent supply of slaves and a ready market for European weaponry.

Lat Sukaabe ensured the dominance of the Gej matrilineage for much of the next two centuries, supplanting the Dorobe and Gelwaar. His paternal lineage would continue in power until 1763. The relative importance of matrilinear line increased at the expense of the patrilinear, perhaps a reflection of a backlash against Islamic customs in favor of traditional ones.
