= Taïf (arrondissement) =

- Arrondissement
- Location within Senegal
- Country: Senegal

Taïf is an arrondissement of Mbacké in Diourbel Region in Senegal.
