= Ndame Arrondissement =

- Arrondissement
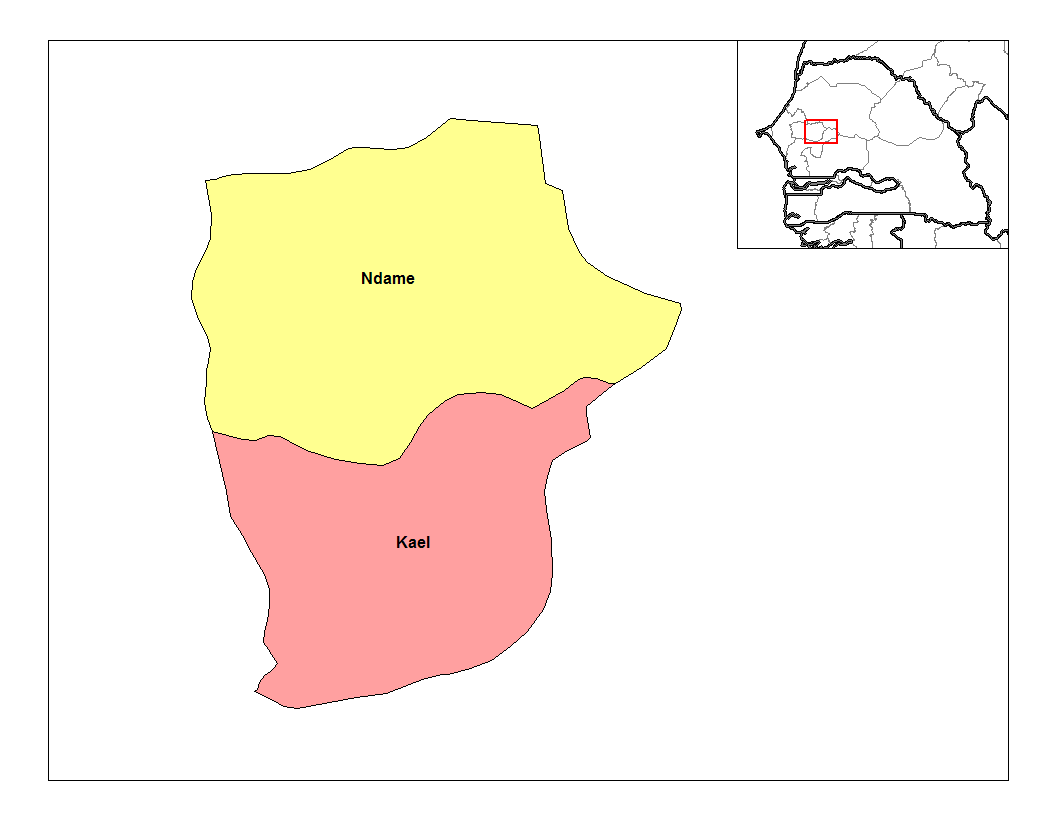
- Location in the Diourbel Region
- Country: Senegal
- Region: Diourbel Region
- Department: Mbacké Department
- Time zone: UTC±00:00 (GMT)

Ndame Arrondissement is an arrondissement of the Mbacké Department in the Diourbel Region of Senegal.

== Subdivisions ==
The arrondissement is divided administratively into rural communities and in turn into villages.

== Notable people ==
Serigne Abdou Khadr Mbacké, the fourth Mouride caliph, was born in 1914 in Daaru Alimul Kabir in Ndame.
