= Baba Garage Arrondissement =

Baba Garage
- Arrondissement
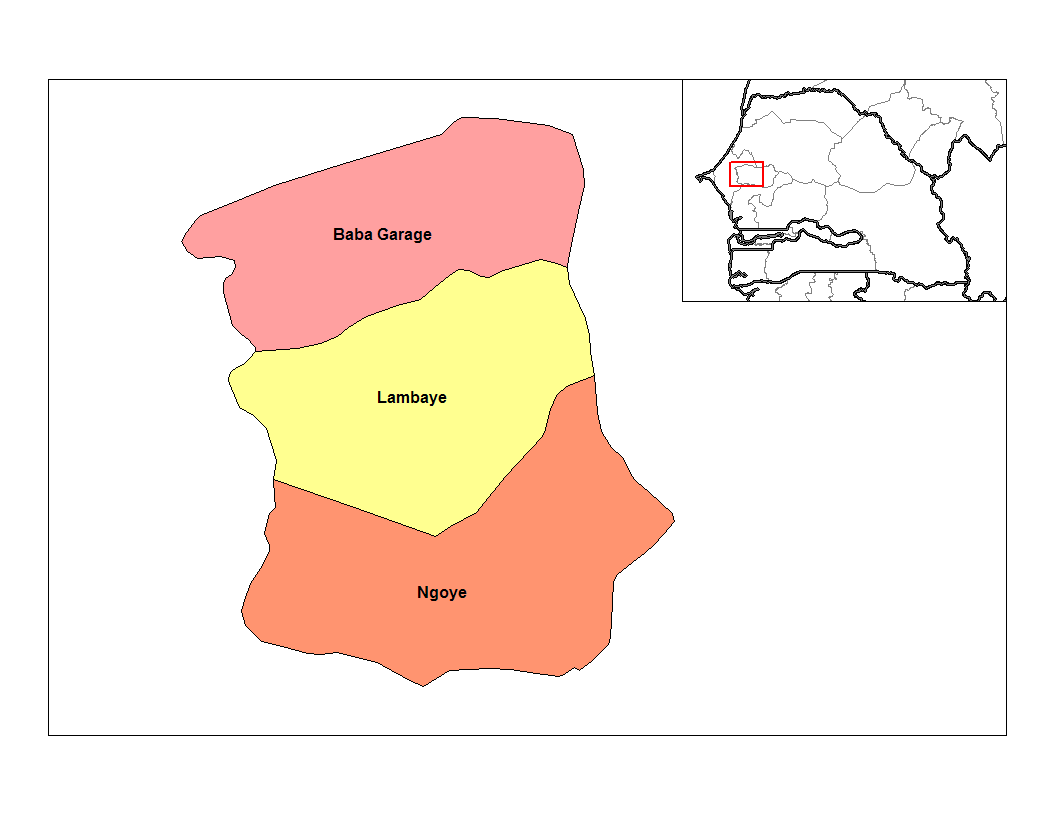
- Location in the Diourbel Region
- Country: Senegal
- Region: Diourbel Region
- Department: Bambey Department
- Time zone: UTC+0 (GMT)

Baba Garage Arrondissement is an arrondissement of the Bambey Department in the Diourbel Region of Senegal.

== Subdivisions ==
The arrondissement is divided administratively into rural communities and in turn into villages. The rural communities are:

- Baba Garage
- Dinguiraye
- Keur Samba Kane
