= Lambaye Arrondissement =

- Arrondissement
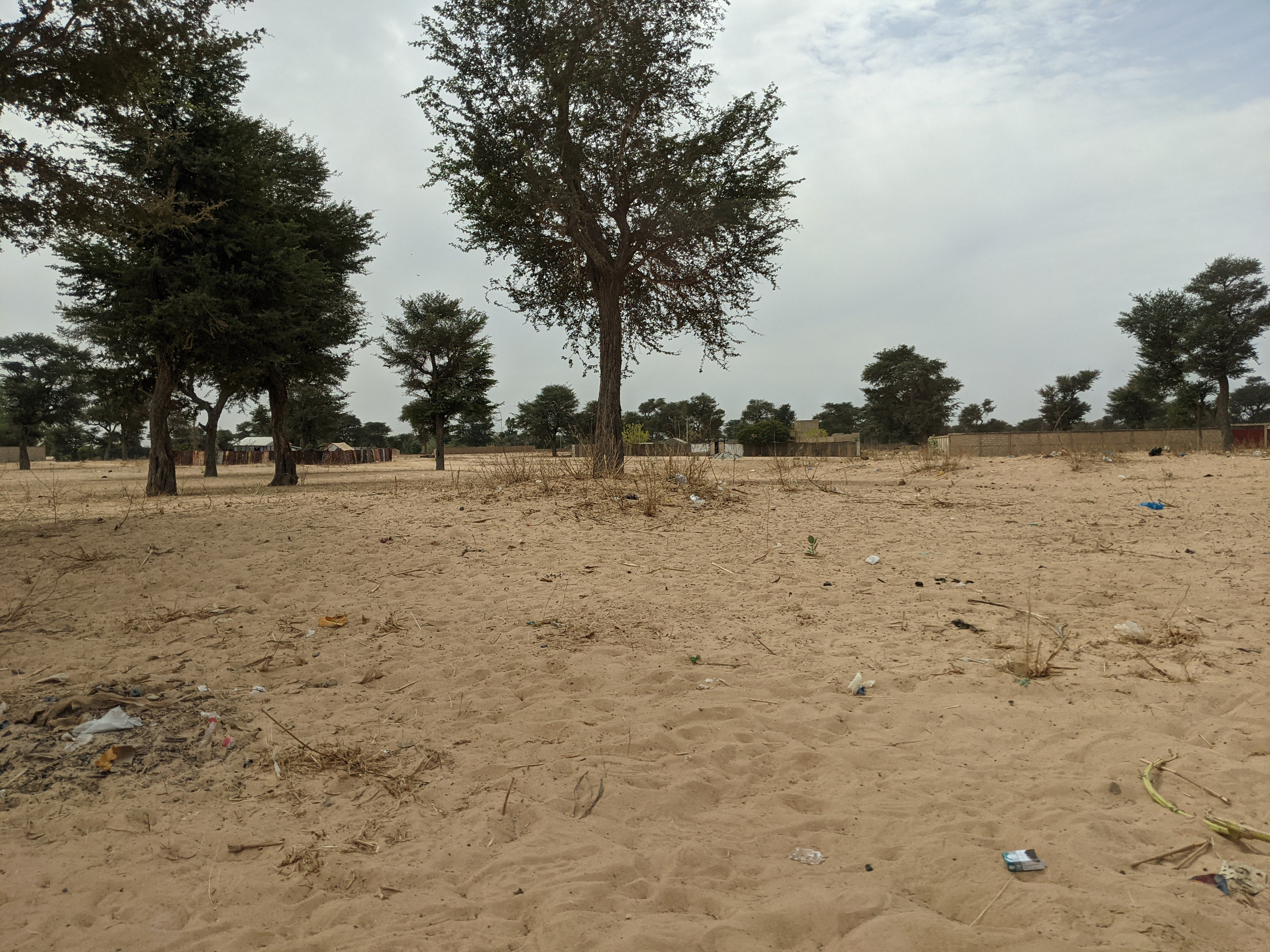
- An agricultural landscape in Lambaye Arrondissement

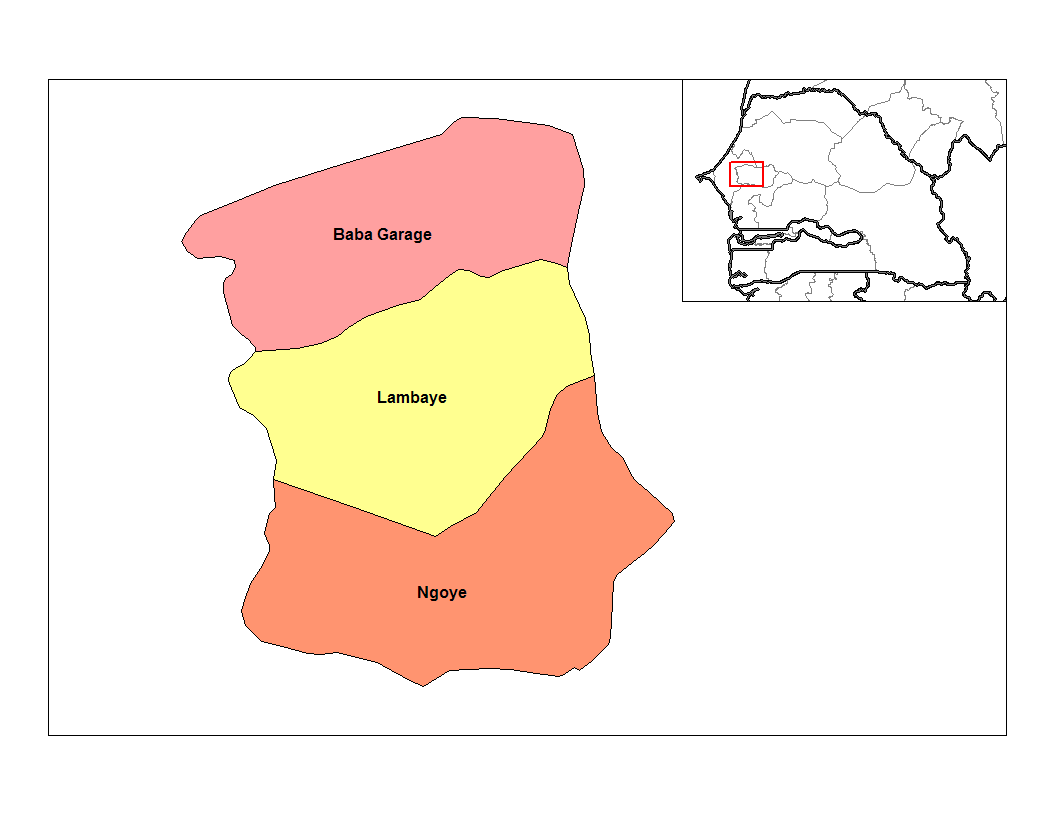
- Location in the Diourbel Region
- Country: Senegal
- Region: Diourbel Region
- Department: Bambey Department
- Time zone: UTC+0 (GMT)

Lambaye Arrondissement is an arrondissement of the Bambey Department in the Diourbel Region of Senegal.

== Subdivisions ==
The arrondissement is divided administratively into four rural communities : Gawane, Lambaye, Ngogom and Réfane.
