= Maissa Bigué Ngoné Fall =

- Damel
- Reign: 1748-1749, 1756-1759
- Predecessor: Maissa Teindé Wedj
- Successor: Madior Dior Yasin Issa
- Died: 1759
- House: Geej Maternal Dynasty
- Religion: Islam

Maissa Bigué Ngoné Fall or Ma Isa Bige Ngone Fall (Gambian English: Ma Isa Begay Ngoneh Faal; other spelling: Isa Bige N'Gone) was King of the Wolof Kingdom of Cayor, in what is now Senegal, during the 18th century. He reigned as Damel from 1748—1749 and again from 1756—1759.

== Family ==
Maissa Bigué belonged to the reigning Fall patrilineage and the "Géej maternal dynasty " of Cayor and Baol, and was a direct maternal descendant of Lingeer Ngoné Dièye, the matriarch of the maternal dynasty of "Géej." He came to the throne as a young man in 1748, succeeding his uncle Maissa Teindé Wedj.

== Rule ==
Shortly after Maissa Bigué was crowned, a rival claimant, Mawa Mbatio Sambe, launched a surprise attack and forced him into exile in Waalo.

From 1749 to 1756 Mawa Mbatio ruled as Damel while Maissa Bigué sought support from neighboring kings. Eventually he led his forces to Maka, where the court resided, and in a brutal urban battle was able to drive his rival out of Cayor. A relative of Mawa Mbatio claimed the throne at Mboul, and held the title for six months while Maissa Bigué rebuilt his strength. At the battle of Sanguere this new claimant was killed, and Maissa Bigué was elected Damel for the second time.

Three years later, in 1759, the Bourba Jolof (king of Jolof) Birayamb Ma-Dyigen Ndaw Njie (or Birayamb-Madjiguène N'Dao N'Diaye) invaded Cayor. He defeated Maissa Bigué at the battle of Bitiwe and exiled him. However, his victory was short-lived, because the following year, Maissa Bigué returned with support from the Emirate of Trarza. The allies defeated the Bourba, and personally killed him in battle at Mbal. As a condition of his aid, however, the Emir received yearly tribute from Cayor, and his warriors were allowed free rein to pillage the kingdom during one month every year.

Maissa Bigué Ngoné Fall died two years after the battle of Mbal, leaving the throne to Madior Dior Yasin Issa.

== See also ==
- Teign
- Damel
- Cayor
