= Réfane =

- Town and commune
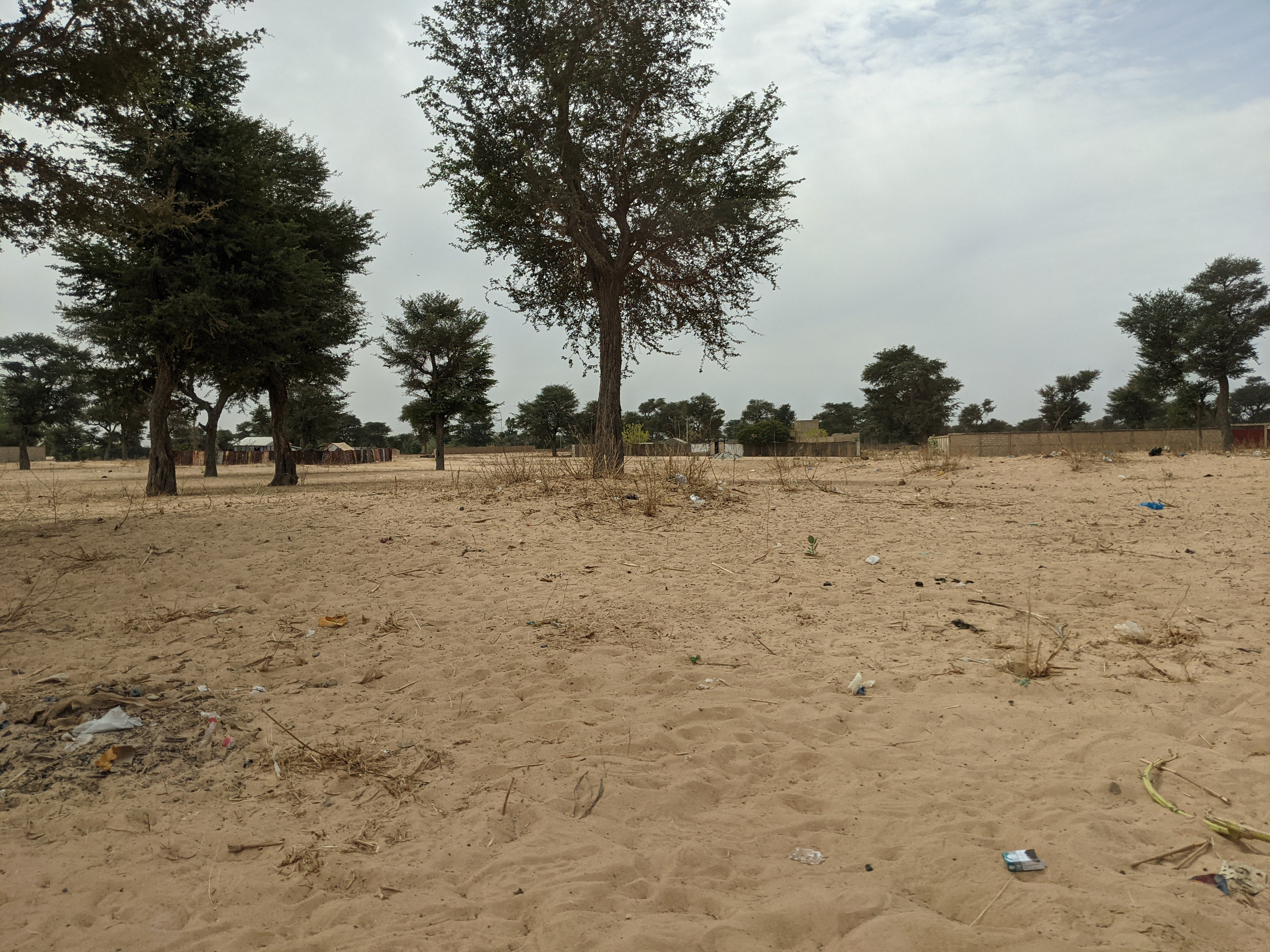
- An agricultural landscape in Refane Commune

- Location in Senegal
- Coordinates: 14.790°N 16.615°W
- Country: Senegal
- Region: Diourbel Region
- Department: Bambey
- Arrondissement: Lambaye

Area
  - Town and commune: 77.44 km^{2} (29.90 sq mi)

Population (2023 census)
  - Town and commune: 39,955
  - Density: 515.9/km^{2} (1,336/sq mi)
- Time zone: UTC+0 (GMT)

Réfane is a town and commune located in the Diourbel Region of Senegal.
