= Cekeen Tumuli =

Ancient burial mounds in Senegal

Coordinates: 14°42′2.91″N 15°57′10.27″W

The tumuli of Cekeen are ancient burial mounds located in the Diourbel Department of the Diourbel Region, in Senegal. The region and the city of Diourbel were part of the precolonial Kingdom of Baol.

== Purpose ==
In this area, a tumulus was used as a burial mound for chiefs. A deceased chief would be joined by other members of his court along with important objects such as furniture and other implements. The burials and objects would be situated in the chief's hut, which was then covered with soil and rocks. Thousands of such tumuli exist in Senegal, with Cekeen containing the largest and densest number.

== World Heritage Status ==
This site was added to the UNESCO World Heritage Tentative List on 18 November 2005, in the cultural category.

== See also ==
- Senegambian stone circles
- History of Senegal
- History of the Gambia
