= Kael Arrondissement =

- Arrondissement
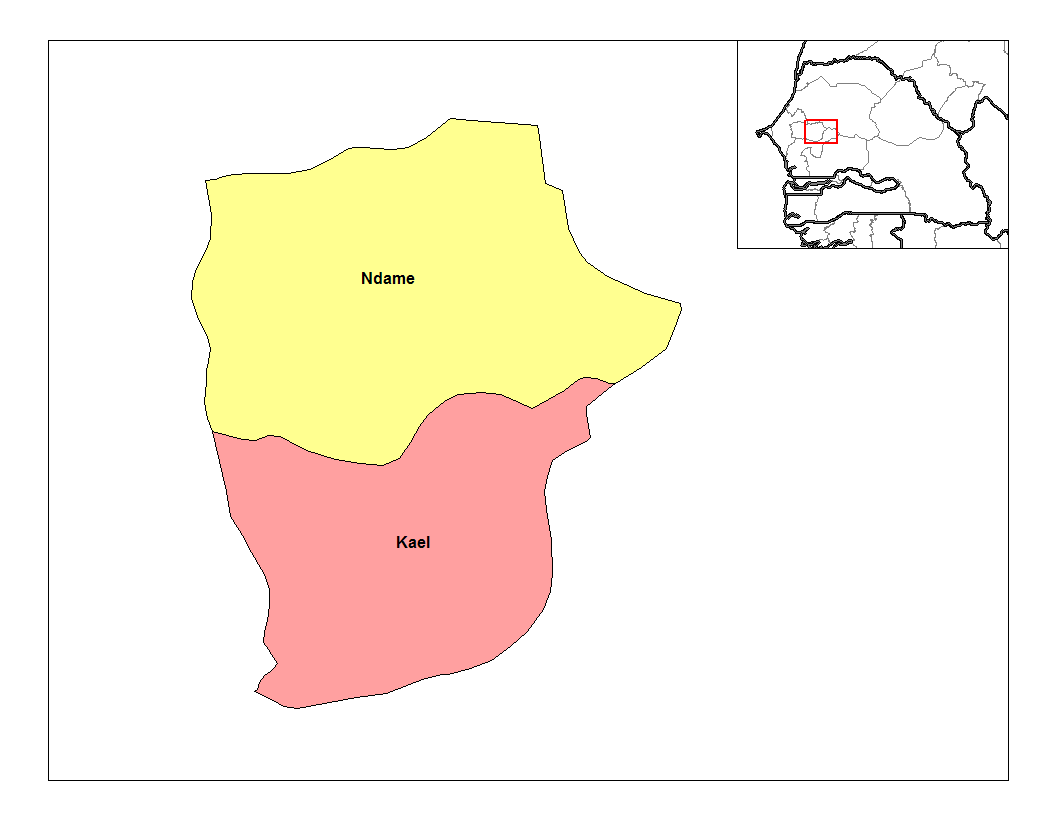
- Location in the Diourbel Region
- Country: Senegal
- Region: Diourbel Region
- Department: Mbacké Department
- Time zone: UTC±00:00 (GMT)

Kael Arrondissement is an arrondissement of the Mbacké Department in the Diourbel Region of Senegal.

== Subdivisions ==
The arrondissement is divided administratively into rural communities and in turn into villages.
