= Ndindy Arrondissement =

- Arrondissement
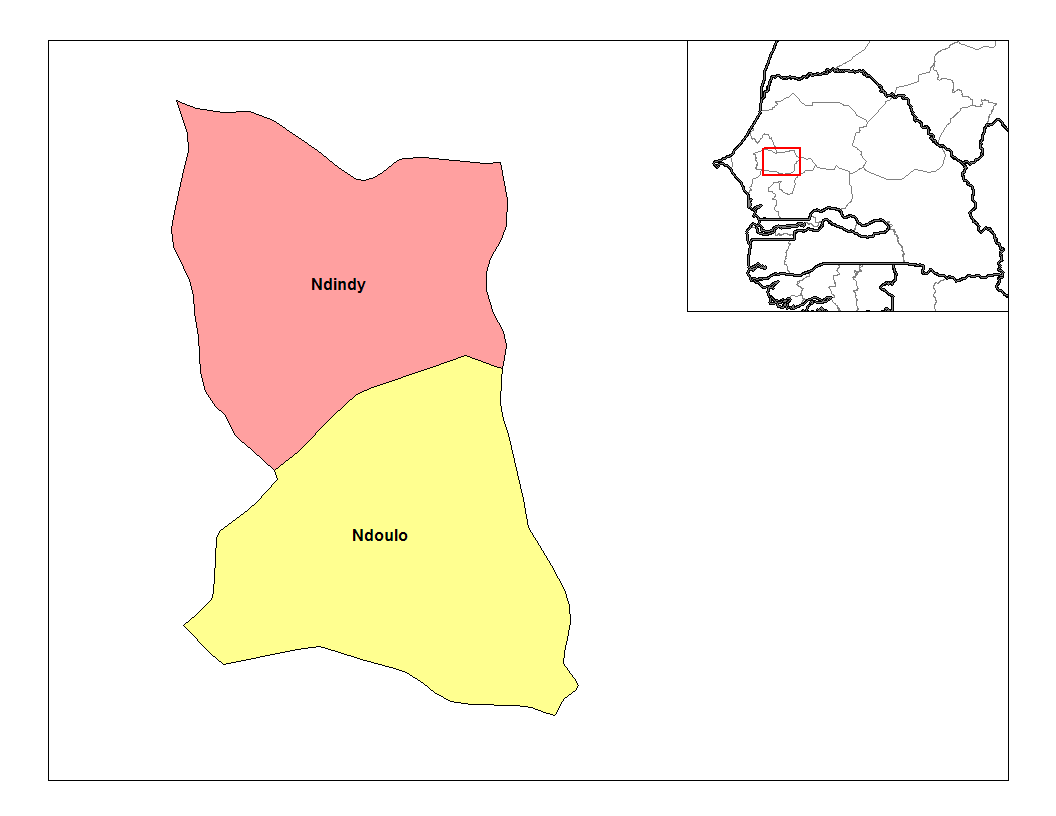
- Location in the Diourbel Region
- Country: Senegal
- Region: Diourbel Region
- Department: Diourbel Department
- Time zone: UTC+0 (GMT)

Ndindy Arrondissement is an arrondissement of the Diourbel Department in the Diourbel Region of Senegal.

== Subdivisions ==
The arrondissement is divided administratively into rural communities and in turn into villages.
