= Centre de linguistique appliquée de Dakar =

Language institute in Dakar, Senegal

The Centre de linguistique appliquée de Dakar (French for "Center of Applied Linguistics of Dakar"), abbreviated CLAD, is a language institute, which especially plays an important role in the orthographical standardization of the Wolof language.

The institute is located in Dakar (Senegal) and belongs to the Cheikh Anta Diop University ( "Université Cheikh Anta Diop").

== History ==
The Centre was founded in 1963, and was initially headed by Gabriel Manessy.

== Overview ==
The Serer Division is headed by Professor Souleymane Faye. Together with his team, they work towards standardizing the Serer language. Faye, a professor of linguistics at the Cheikh Anta Diop University who has authored and co-authored several books and papers pertaining to the Serer and Cangin languages is one of the current professors of the Centre (as of 2012).
