= Cayor =

Former country in present-day Senegal

Kingdom of Cayor Kajoor
- 1549–1886
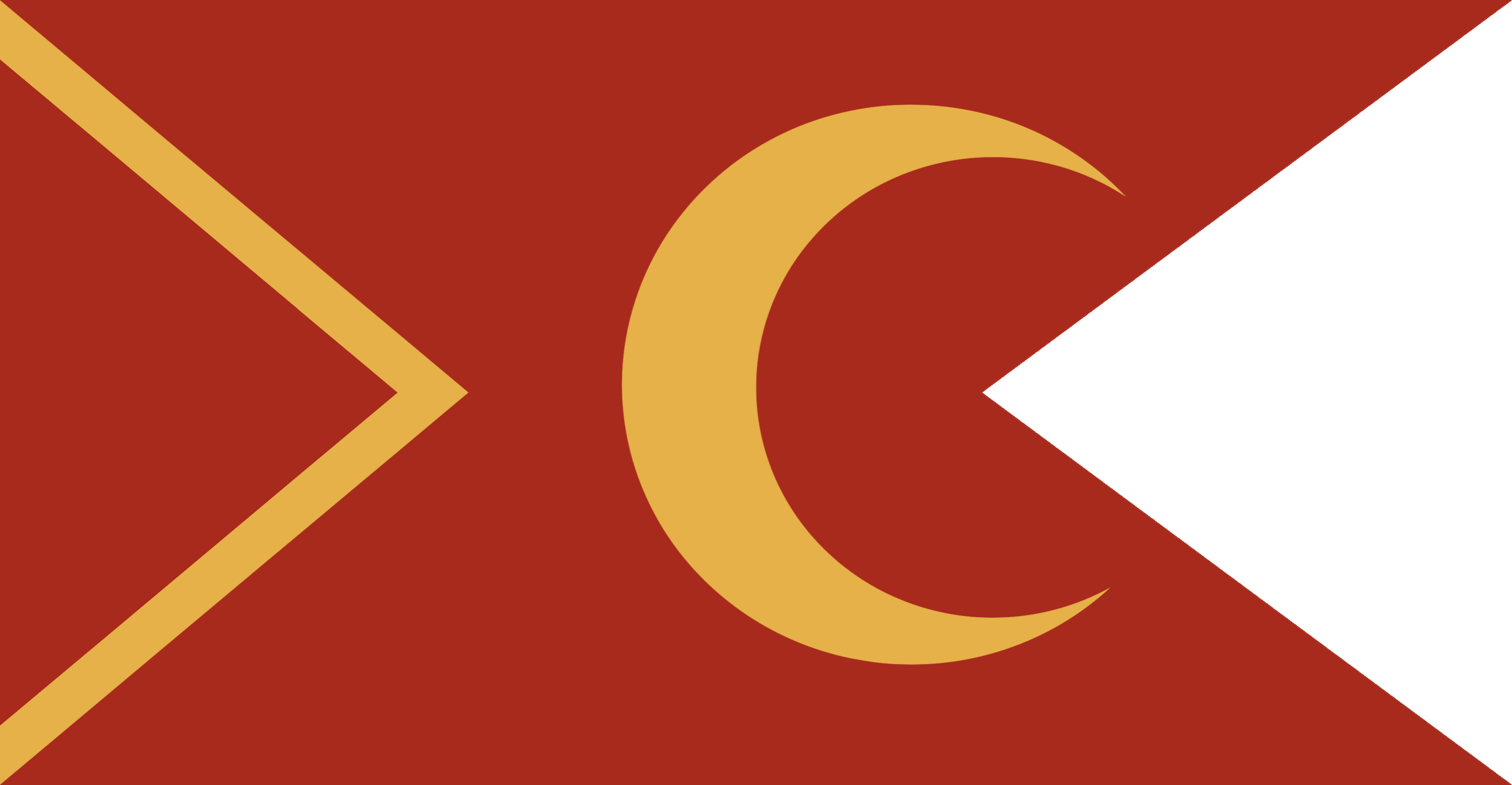
- Reconstructed flag

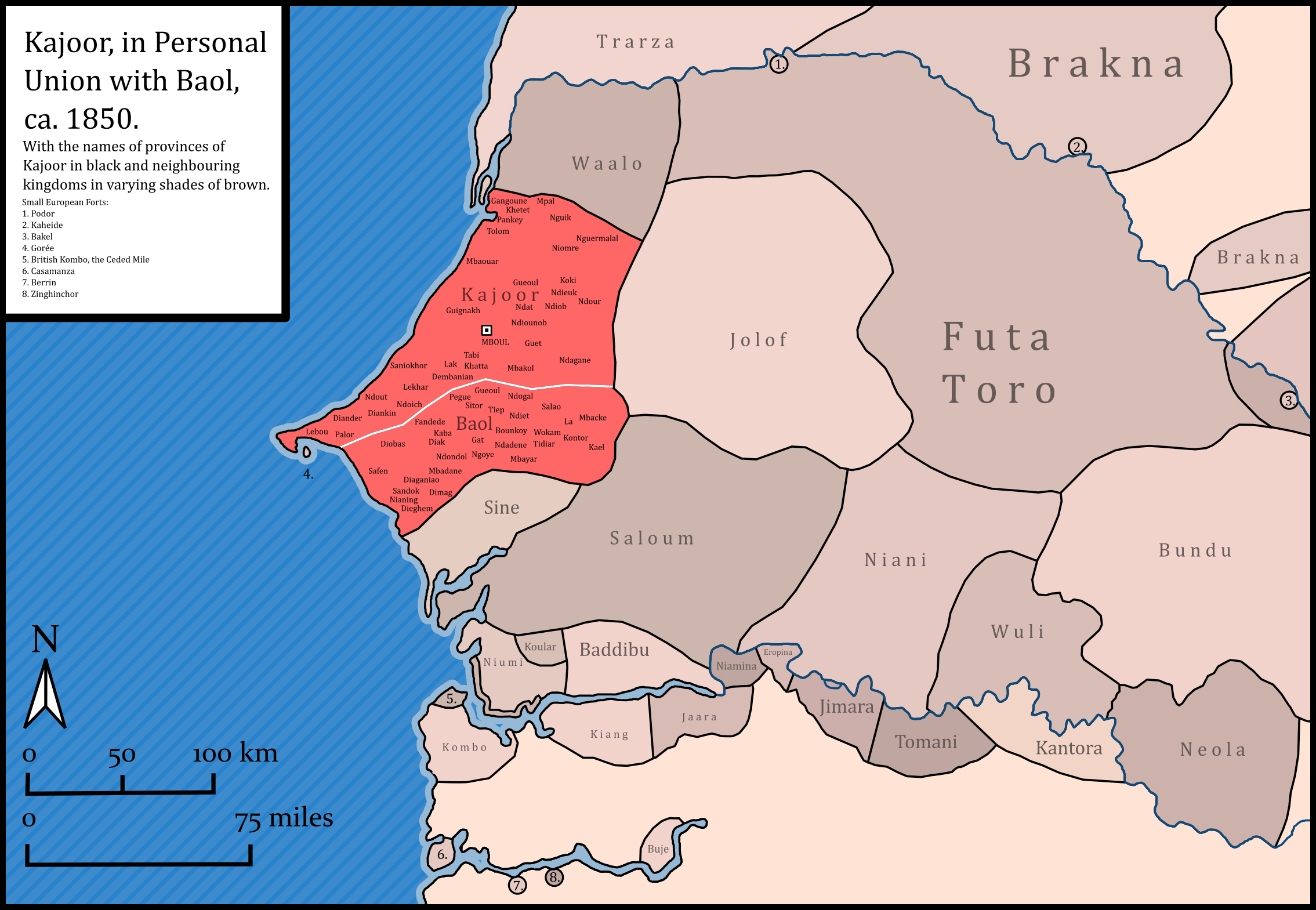
- Cayor in red, ca. 1850.
- Status: Kingdom
- Capital: Mboul (traditional)
- Common languages: Wolof
- Religion: Islam
- Demonym: Cayorian
- Government: Monarchy
- Damel
  - 1549: Dece Fu Njogu (first)
  - 1886-1902: Demba War Sall (last)
- History
  - Cayor defeats Jolof at Battle of Danki: 1549
  - French colonization: 1886
- Currency: Cowries; Iron bars
Preceded by	Succeeded by
Wolof Empire	French West Africa

The Cayor Kingdom (Wolof: Kajoor; Arabic: كاجور) was from 1549 to 1886 the largest and most powerful kingdom that split off from the Jolof Empire in what is now Senegal. The Cayor Kingdom was located in northern and central Senegal, southeast of Waalo, west of the kingdom of Jolof, and north of Baol and the Kingdom of Sine.

== Etymology ==
Cayor (also spelled Kayor, Kadior, Cadior, Kadjoor, Nkadyur, Kadyoor, Encalhor, among others) comes from the Wolof endonym for the inhabitants "Waadyor" meaning "people of the joor", a fertile soil found in northern Cayor. This distinguishes the people of Cayor from their neighbors, who to the present day refer to themselves by doubling the name of their native region (e.g. Waalo-Waalo, Saloum-Saloum).

== History ==
There are no written sources for the early history of Cayor, and even oral traditions are sparse. The legend of Ndiadiane Ndiaye, the first Buurba Jolof, claims that the ruler of Cayor voluntarily submitted to him, but this is likely a later invention to celebrate the unity of the empire. Cayor certainly existed before its integration into the empire, as the kings lists preserved in oral history goes back as far as Jolof's.

Under Jolof hegemony, Cayor was ruled by a Great Lamane traditionally elected by the other Lamanes from the Fall family of Palene Ded, who claimed descend from Ousmane Boune Afal, a companion of Mohammed, by means of Wagadou. Every year this Great Lamane would lead a large delegation to Jolof to pay tribute to the Buurba there.

=== Independence and Amary Ngone ===
In 1549, the damel (dammeel in Wolof, often translated into European languages as "king") Dece Fu Njogu, having failed to send tribute to the Buurba Léléfoulifak for several years, sent his son Amary Ngone Sobel Fall to do so. Amary, aided by his uncle the Teigne of Baol, led an army to a lake called Danki, and left them there to go to the Buurba's court with a small escort. Poorly received by Léléfoulifak, he announced that his country had no need of a leader such as that. The Jolof-Jolof pursued them back to Danki, where the Cayor forces routed them and killed Léléfoulifak.

The battle of Danki marked the end of the Jolof Empire's hold over Cayor. In the ensuing celebrations Dece Fu Njogu was killed in an accident, and Amary Ngone became damel. His uncle died soon afterwards, and he thus became the first Damel-Teigne ruling over both Cayor and Baol. He proclaimed a new constitution for the kingdom and founded a new, more centrally located capital at Mboul. In the years after his accession Jolof invaded several times attempting to re-assert their hegemony but were defeated. They would not dare to attack Cayor again until Amary's death, after a 44-year reign.

=== Marabout Wars ===
During the height of the Tubenaan movement in the late 17th century, marabouts across the region began to aspire to political power for the first time, advocating a restoration of traditional Islamic values. Futa Toro was the first to fall. In Cayor, the powerful marabout Ndiaye Sall allied with Yacine Bubu, who had recently and controversially been removed from her position as lingeer by her nephew, the Damel Detye Maram. They joined forces to overthrow him, enthroning another nephew of Yacine Bubu's, Ma Faly Gueye. Six months later, however, Gueye was caught drinking alcohol by Sall's talibes and killed. Yacine Bubu, determined to protect the power of the royal family and prevent Sall from establishing a theocracy, convened a secret assembly of notables to reach out to Makhoredia Diouf, Buur of Saloum, for support against the marabouts. They were successful in defeating Sall, but instability continued for years afterwards.

In 1693 the aristocracy, now threatened by the Buur of Saloum, appealed to the Teigne of neighboring Baol, Lat Sukaabe Fall for help. He took over Cayor and declared himself the Damel-Teigne, imposing the hegemony of his maternal line, the Geej, over the previously dominant Dorobe and Guelwaar matriclans. He also strengthened central power, coopted the marabouts with royal appointments, and frequently clashed with the French over their attempts to impose a trade monopoly on the kingdom.

=== 18th Century ===
During the 18th century, under the leadershup of Damel Maïsa Teindde Ouédji, Cayor annexed the Kingdom of Baol but was then embroiled in a succession dispute after his death. Baol regained its independence in 1756. During the 1750s and 60s, Cayor was repeatedly involved in wars against Waalo and Jolof, with the Buurba ruling as Damel 1759-60. The forces of the Trarza Emirate helped Maissa Bigué Ngoné Fall regain the throne, in return for yearly tribute and permission to raid in Cayor one month a year.

In 1776, inspired by the rise of the Imamate of Futa Toro, the marabouts of Cayor again began to agitate for political power under the leadership of Malamin Sarr. Damel Amari Ngoone Ndela Kumba pre-emptively attacked, capturing Sarr's son and selling him into slavery. In response, some clerics did the same to agents of the crown. In a climactic showdown the marabouts were defeated, Sarr was killed, and many were again sold into slavery. The surviving marabouts played an important role in founding the Lebou republic on the Cap-Vert peninsula.

Soon after, the Almamy of Futa Toro Abdul Kader joined with the Buurba of Jolof to avenge the clerics and re-establish his influence over Cayor. As the invading army crossed the Ferlo Desert, the damel removed food stores and poisoned wells so that the exhausted Torodbe could not replenish their supplies. At the battle of Bunxoy, Amari Ngoone Ndela destroyed the Futanke force and captured Abdul Kader himself. He treated him well, as a respected religious leader, then sent him home laden with gifts after the Torodbe had elected a new almamy.

In the aftermath of this decisive victory of the old, secular order over reformist Islamists, tension continued to increase between the clerics and the nobility. During this period, contemporary writers began to refer to the ruling class as 'pagan' for the first time, although they still self-identified as Muslim.

=== Lat Jor and the French ===
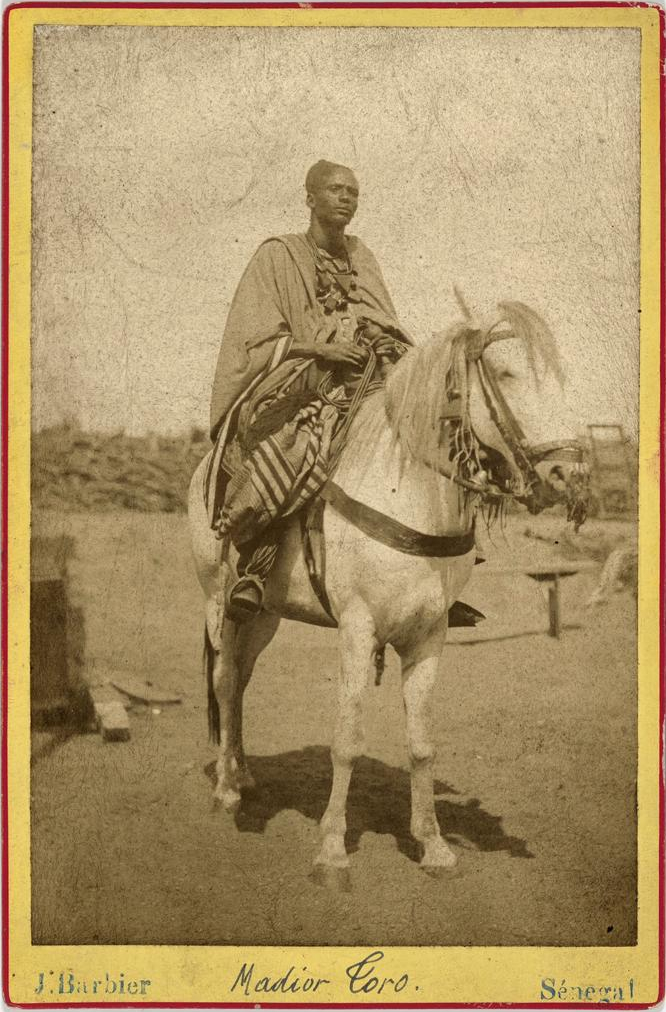
Circa 1890-1900. Madior Tioro Fall, son of Ma Dyodyo (Damel Madiodio Déguen Coddou). Photo taken by Joannès Barbier during the later Peul revolt.

Birima Ngoné Latir was crowned damel in 1855, succeeding his uncle who had raised him after his father Makodou Koumba, the Teigne of Baol, had been driven into exile.

The French governor Louis Faidherbe, based in Saint-Louis, encouraged the clerics to rebel again. In 1859 the marabouts of the province of Ndiambour took advantage of the rumoured death of the young, weak damel to do so. Makodou Koumba returned from exile to help crush the rebellion. A brutal war resulted, with the reigning teigne Thié Yasin Ngoné Déguèn coming to support the marabouts with the promise of becoming damel. After winning battles at Mboul and Mekhe, and 2 years of conflict, Birima Ngoné Latir defeated the Baol-Baol army and Makodou Koumba was reinstalled as teigne. Latir died soon after, however, and Makodou left Baol to succeed his son as damel.

Makodou faced resistance from his son’s maternal side, who wanted Birima Ngoné’s half-brother, Lat Jor, enthroned instead. However, Lat Jor was not eligible for the throne as he did not bear the patronym Fall. Despite this, his uncle Demba War Sall, who was seen as the true master of Cayor, had trained him for the throne and, at the age of 17, enthroned him by force. Makodou defeated the opposition at Béri-Ngaraf, and Lat Jor submitted. He later reneged on a treaty signed with the French to build a railroad across Cayor, prompting the French to invade in 1861 and replace him with Ma-Dyodyo.[1]: 33 [13] Lat Jor and the nobility resented both the harsh rule of Ma-Dyodyo and the external intervention. After some initial military success in 1863, he was forced to take refuge with the almaami of Saloum, Maba Diakhou Ba, early the next year.

The French attempted to annex the country, but this ultimately proved unworkable. In 1868 Lat Jor and his troops returned to Cayor to regain independence. He allied with Shaikh Amadou Ba and defeated the French in the battle of Mekhe on July 8th, 1869. By 1871 the French accepted his restoration to the position of damel. Amadou Ba's meddling in Cayor, however, soon ended their partnership. Over the next few years Lat Jor tried to exert his authority over Baol and helped the French defeat and kill Amadou in 1875.

This alliance was broken in 1881 when Lat Jor began a rebellion to resist the construction of the Dakar to Saint-Louis railway across Cayor. Dior is reported to have told the French Governor Servatius:

"As long as I live, be assured, I shall oppose, with all my might the construction of this railway."

In 1883, Lat Jor attempted to depose the powerful Farba Demba War Sall, the very uncle who had enthroned him years earlier. Demba War defected to Samba Laobe Fall, Lat Jor’s nephew and rival claimant to the throne.[1]: 36 With French support, Samba soon took control of Cayor. He ruled for three years before clashing with Alboury Ndiaye, Bourba of Jolof. Despite a treaty requiring him to notify the French before making war, Samba invaded Jolof. Alboury Ndiaye attacked while Samba’s exhausted troops were setting up camp, routing the Waadjor forces and wounding Samba. The French pressured the damel to pay reparations, but he refused. At the ensuing negotiations in Tivaouane on October 6, 1886, a fight broke out, and Samba was killed by a French lieutenant.[1]: 37–8 Lat Jor died in battle soon afterward, and the kingdom of Cayor ceased to exist as an independent, united state. However, rather than falling entirely under external rule, it was divided into provinces, with power ultimately remaining in the hands of Demba War Sall and his family, who continued to govern the region.[20]

== Culture ==
Cayor society was highly stratified. The damel and nobles (Garmi) were at the top of the hierarchy followed by free men (including villagers and marabouts) who were known as Jambur. Below the Jambur were the Nyenoo, members of hereditary and endogamous castes such as metalworkers, tailors, griots, woodcarvers, etc. The lowest group of the hierarchy consisted of Dyaam, or slaves. Slaves were generally treated well and those that were owned by the kingdom often exercised military and political power.

The Tyeddo class were warriors generally recruited among the slaves of the damel. Fiercely opposed to the strict practice of Islam advocated by the marabouts, they were renowned drinkers, brave fighters, and inveterate raiders, including within Cayor. Their depredations went a long way to creating unrest and promoting Islam among the population. Cayor peasants tended to deliberately produce less food than they could, as wealth was an invitation to raiders; when colonial rule ended the raiding, food production and exports rose dramatically.

== Government ==
In addition to Cayor, the damel also ruled over the Lebou area of Cap-Vert (where modern Dakar is), and they often ruled as the "Teignes" (rulers) of the neighboring kingdom of Baol. In 1445, Venetian traveler Alvise Cadamosto reported that the king's entourage included Berber and Arab clerics. The Khali advised the king and was the official representation of the clerical class at the court.

Traditionally the damel himself was not purely hereditary, but was designated by a 4-member council consisting of:

- the Jaurin Bul (Diawrine-Boul), hereditary chief of the Jambur ("free men"; French Diambour) and president of the council
- the Calau (Tchialaw), chief of the canton of Jambanyan (Diambagnane)
- the Botal (Bôtale), chief of the canton of Jop (Diop), and
- the Baje (Badgié), chief of the canton of Gateny (Gatègne).

The damel nominated several other important political positions. The lingeer was generally the oldest woman of the ruling matrilineage, frequently the king's mother, sister, or cousin. Yacine Bubu's replacement as lingeer by her younger sister was an important catalyst for her rebellion. She controlled her own army of slave soldiers and clients, and received the tax income of a province. The kangam were provincial governors and ministers. The dyambor served as viceroy, and was a garmi and close kin to the damel. Some villages were designated as being run by princesses called dye.

== Religion ==
Trans-Saharan traders brought Islam to the region in the 8th century, and it rapidly became the dominant tradition among the Wolof, to the point where historians can find no traces of a pre-Islamic organized religion. The practice of Islam, however, was syncreticized with local customs in much the same way that Christianity was adapted to an underlying pagan context in Europe. This has led to debate among scholars, some of whom characterize the nobility of Cayor and other Senegambian kingdoms as 'pagan' (despite their self-identification as Muslims) in opposition to a more stringently Muslim marabout class. Islam was the official religion of the state and of the entire population. When Christian missionaries asked the damel for permission to prosyletize in 1848, he refused, saying that as Muslims the Wajoor already knew God; he sent them to convert the Serer instead.

Most of the marabouts in Cayor were Fulas from Futa Toro, but integrated into the Wolof population over time. There was a clear separation between the clerical and noble classes, although nobles and freemen could join the marabout class as talibe (disciples). Lat Jor's acceptance of a marabout patron in Maba (sometimes referred to as his conversion to Islam) prompted a rapid shift away from more syncreticized Islamic practices among the inhabitants of Cayor generally.

== List of rulers ==
Names and dates taken from John Stewart's African States and Rulers (1989).

1. Detye Fu-N'diogu (1549)
2. Amari Fall (1549-1593)
3. Samba Fall(1593-1600)
4. Khuredya Fall (1600-1610)
5. Biram Manga Fall (1610-1640)
6. Dauda Demba Fall (1640-1647)
7. Dyor Fall (1647-1664)
8. Birayma Yaasin-Bubu Fall (1664–1681)
9. Detye Maram N'Galgu Fall (1681–1683)
10. Faly Fall (1683–1684)
11. Khuredya Kumba Fall (1684–1691)
12. Birayma Mbenda-Tyilor Fall (1691–1693)
13. Dyakhere Fall (1693)
14. Dethialaw Fall (1693–1697)
15. Lat Sukaabe Fall (1697–1719)
16. Isa-Tende Fall (1719–1748)
17. Isa Bige N'Gone Fall (1758–1759) (First Reign)
18. Birayma Yamb Fall (1759–1760)
19. Isa Bige N'Gone Fall (1760–1763) (Second Reign)
20. Dyor Yaasin Isa Fall (1763–1766)
21. Kodu Kumba Fall (1766–1777)
22. Birayama Faatim-Penda Fall (1777–1790)
23. Amari Fall (1790–1809)
24. Birayama Fatma Fall (1809–1832)
25. Isa Ten-Dyor Fall (1832–1855)
26. Birayama-Fall (1855–1859)
27. Ma-Kodu Fall (1859 – May 1861)
28. Ma-Dyodyo Fall (May 1861 – December 1861) (First Reign)
29. Lat-Dyor Diop (1862 – December 1863) (First Reign)
30. Ma-Dyodyo Fall (January 1864 – 1868) (Second Reign)
31. Lat-Dyor Diop (1868 – December 1872) (Second Reign)
32. Amari Fall (January 1883 – August 1883)
33. Samba Fall (1883–1886)
34. Demba War Sall (1886-1902)

== See also ==
- Jolof Empire
- History of Senegal
- Lingeer Ngoné Dièye

== Sources ==
- Barry, Boubacar (1998). Senegambia and the Atlantic slave trade. Cambridge, UK: Cambridge University Press.
- Boulegue, Jean (2013). Les royaumes wolof dans l'espace sénégambien (XIIIe-XVIIIe siècle) (in French). Paris: Karthala Editions.
- Charles, Eunice A. (1977). Precolonial Senegal : the Jolof Kingdom, 1800-1890. Brookline, MA: African Studies Center, Boston University.
- Lewis, Jori (2022). Slaves for Peanuts: A Story of Conquest, Liberation, and a Crop That Changed History. The New Press. ISBN 978-1-62097-156-7.
- Lewis, I. M. (2017). Islam in Tropical Africa. Taylor & Francis. ISBN 978-1-138-23275-4.
- Monteil, Vincent (1963). "Lat-Dior, damel du Kayor (1842-1886) et l'islamisation des Wolofs". Archives de Sociologie des Religions. 8 (16): 77–104. doi:10.3406/assr.1963.2004. JSTOR 30127542.
- Searing, James F. (2002). "God alone is king" : Islam and emancipation in Senegal : the Wolof kingdoms of Kajoor and Bawol, 1859-1914. NH: Heinemann.
