= Dece Fu Njogu =

Dece Fu Djogu Fall
- Lamane, Damel
- Reign: 1549
- Successor: Amary Ngone Sobel Fall
- Died: 1549; Palen Ded
- Spouse: Wagadu Ngone Ndiaye
- Issue: Dialene Yasser, Amary Ngone Sobel, Tie Yacine, Tie Ndella

Dece Fu Njogu (Wolof: Decee Fu Njoogu; French: Détié Fou Ndiogou) was the last Lamane and first Damel of Cayor.

At the time Cayor was a vassal of the Jolof Empire, and for a period of several years Dece Fu had failed to pay tribute. In 1549 he sent his son Amary Ngone Sobel Fall with a large retinue to do so, but the Buurba (emperor) refused to accept the payment. Amary left for Cayor, declaring that his homeland would no longer be subject to a ruler who would not deign to even accept their gifts. The Jolof army pursued them but were defeated at the Battle of Danki.

When Dece Fu Njogu heard the news he proclaimed himself Damel, or 'breaker', and ordered that every bull in the area be brought together for a feast to celebrate Cayor's independence. When they were assembled, he went into the enclosure to choose the best ones for the feast. A bull spooked and in the chaos the new Damel was killed, having reigned for only six days. His son Amary succeeded him as Damel.
