= Persecution of traditional African religions =

Traditional African religions have faced persecution from Christians and Muslims. Adherents of these religions have been forcefully converted to Islam and Christianity, demonized and marginalized. The atrocities include killings, waging war, destroying of sacred places, and other atrocities.

== By Muslims ==
After the establishment of Islam, its rapid expansion and conquests displaced traditional African religions either by conversion or conquest. Traditional African religions have influenced Islam in Africa, and Islam is considered by Douglas E. Thomas as having more commonality with traditional African religions then Christianity does, but conflict has occurred, especially due to Islam's monotheistic stance and the rise of Muslim reformers such as Askia.

Traditional African religions are tolerant of other gods, which allows general co-existence for multiple religions. This has been regarded by some authors to be another reason behind the rise of other religions in Africa. Most followers of traditional religions accommodated Islam during the start of its spread in Africa, but in West Africa, it was not until the coming of colonialism that Islam gained mass appeal, transforming even groups with historical animosity towards Islamic domination into Muslim communities.

In many instances, conflicting groups chose to align with Muslim armies against other African communities.

=== Relationship ===
Abdullahi Ahmed An-Na'im wrote that the initial stages in the relationship betweein Islam and traditional African religions "are generally believed to have been characterized by co-existence and mutual accommodation between Islam and Traditional African Religions. The process of conversion and cultural transformation was very gradual, usually working through several generations, in either incorporating or accommodating Islamic institutions."

In the Songhai Empire, the ruler Sonni Baru held or syncretised aspects of the African traditional religions and was challenged by Askia because he was not seen as a faithful Muslim. Askia would later wage wars against those who were politically non-aligned Muslims and non-Muslims.

After Dunama Dabbalemi of the Sayfawa dynasty converted to Islam, he waged Jihad, or holy war, against the proponents of the Kanuri religion, seeking to destroy its presence.

In the Swahili coast, Muslims were not interested in preaching, colonization, or jihad. It was not until the 18th century that Islam spread into the interior. Molefi Asante notes that:

The religion of Islam made each Muslim merchant or traveler an embryonic missionary and the appeal of the religion with its similarities to the African religions was far more powerful than the Christian appeal.

The Dinka people largely rejected or ignored Islamic (and Christian) teachings, as Abrahamic religious beliefs were incompatible with their society, culture and traditional beliefs.

== By Christians ==
The early Christians of Niger Delta, who were against the customs and traditions of the indigenous tribes, carried out atrocities such as destroying their shrines and killing the sacred monitor lizards.

The European colonization of Africa is noted to have paved the way of Christian missionaries into Africa. In some cases, the leaders of traditional African religions were persecuted by the missionaries and regarded as the "devil's agents". Ali Mazrui has discussed similar issues in the book The African Condition. A further example of persecution by missionaries is how many of the earliest Christian missionaries to the Shona people, of modern-day Zimbabwe, desecrated shrines located in Matonjeni, harassed Shona priests and decried Mwari, the Shona God, as being a fake and inept God. This persecution continued until the Shona were completely prevented from worshipping their God, Mwari, at Matonjeni.

Despite attempts at tolerance and Interreligious Dialogue, in many Christian churches there was a belief that "everything African seems to be pagan", and some argue this view remains today in certain evangelical Pentecostal religious positions. The historical view that Africans had to become "civilized" by colonialism and Christian missionary activity likely contributed to the intolerance of traditional religions during the colonial period. These views culminated in some colonials rejecting that traditional African faiths were proper religions.

Practitioners of the Bwiti religion have faced persecution by Christian missionaries and French colonial authorities, as well as some members of the present Gabon government.

== Modern times ==
On 2001, an Oro Festival in Sagamu was violated by the Muslim Hausa-Fulani inhabitants, causing a temporary breakdown between the groups.

In September 2005, the sleepy town of Iwo, Osun State, became a theatre of war when a group of Muslims called the Tahun took on the community's masquerade festival in brazen and violent attacks.

== See also ==
- Persecution of Serers
