= Mbacké department =

Coordinates: 14°48′09″N 16°02′59″W

Mbacké
- Department
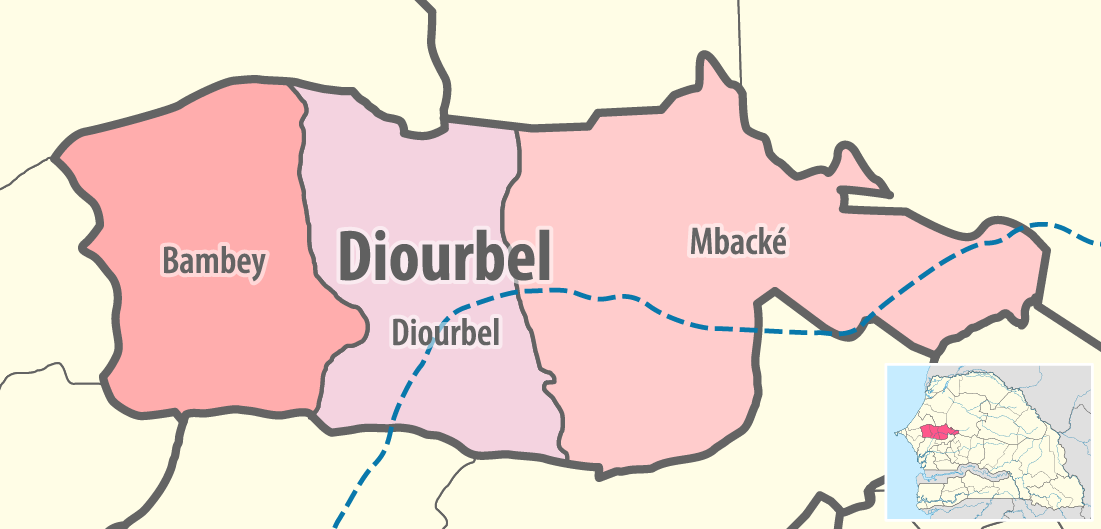
- Location in the Diourbel Region
- Country: Senegal
- Region: Diourbel Region
- Capital: Mbacké

Area
  - Total: 1,833 km^{2} (708 sq mi)

Population (2023 census)
  - Total: 1,359,757
  - Density: 741.8/km^{2} (1,921/sq mi)
- Time zone: UTC+0 (GMT)

Mbacké department is one of the 46 departments of Senegal, and one of the three constituting the Diourbel region.

The capital of the department is the only commune, Mbacké.

The rural districts (communautés rurales) are:

- Kael Arrondissement
  - Dendeye Gouy Gui
  - Darou Salam Typ
  - Kael
  - Madina
  - N'Dioumane
  - Touba Mboul
  - Darou Nahim
  - Taïba Thiékène
- Ndame Arrondissement
  - Dalla Ngabou
  - Missirah
  - Nghaye
  - Touba Fall
  - Touba Mosquée
- Taïf Arrondissement
  - Sadio
  - Taïf

Historic sites

Grand Mosque at Touba

- Grand Mosque at Touba
- Aynou Rahmati, wells of the Miséricorde at Touba
- Gouye Tékhé and Gouye Ziarra baobab trees at Touba
- Négou Mame Diarra Bousso at Khourou Mbacké
- Tumulus field at Thiékène, Sous-Préfecture of Kael
- Tumulus at Gninguène.

== See also ==
- Touba
