= Diourbel department =

Coordinates: 14°39′46″N 16°23′33″W

Diourbel
- Department
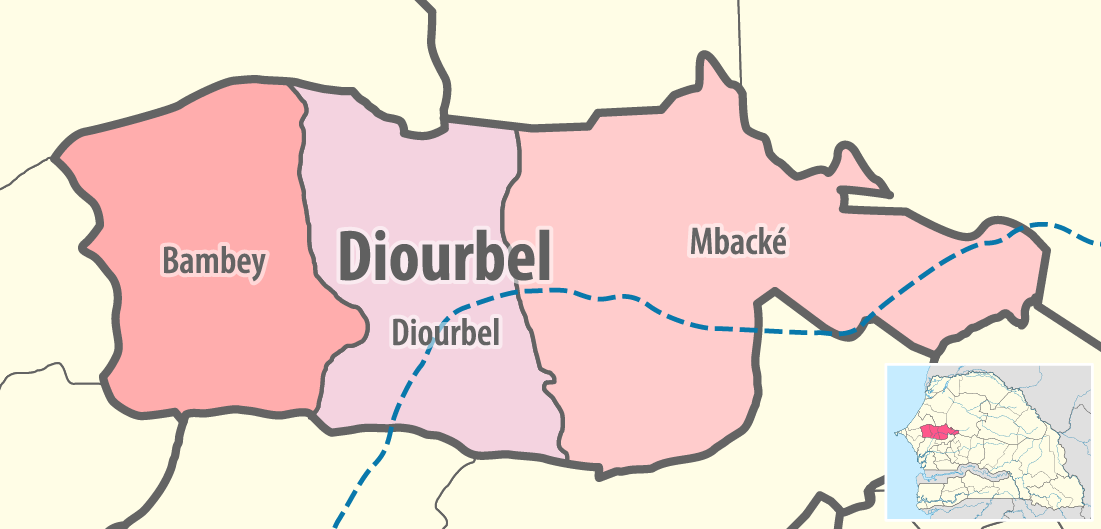
- Location in the Diourbel Region
- Country: Senegal
- Region: Diourbel Region
- Capital: Diourbel

Area
  - Total: 1,175 km^{2} (454 sq mi)

Population (2023 census)
  - Total: 344,108
  - Density: 292.9/km^{2} (758.5/sq mi)
- Time zone: UTC+0 (GMT)

Diourbel department is one of the 46 departments of Senegal, one of the three constituting the Diourbel region.

There is one commune in the department, which is Diourbel.

The rural districts (communautés rurales) are:

- Ndindy Arrondissement
  - Ndankh Sene
  - Gade Escale
  - Keur Ngalgou
  - N'Dindy
  - Taïba Moutoupha
  - Touba Lappe
- Ndoulo Arrondissement
  - N'Doulo
  - N'Gohe
  - Patar
  - Tocky-Gare
  - Toure M'Bonde

Historic sites

- Grand Mosque of Diourbel
- Prefecture
- Railway station
- Building housing the Post Office
- Battlefield of Bounghoye
- Battlefield of Ndiaby
- Ibrahima Thioye school, Diourbel town
- Baobab tree called "Gouye Sambaye Karang" in Keur Yéli Manel Fall Quarter, Diourbel town
- Baobab tree called "Gouye Woté" in Ndiodione Quarter, Diourbel
- Residence of Cheikh Ahmadou Bamba, Diourbel town
- Battlefield of Sambé
- Battlefield of Ngagnane, administrative centre of Diourbel
- Sereer tombs at Ndayane and associated remains
