= Amary Ngone Sobel Fall =

Damel-Teigne
- Reign: 1549-1593
- Predecessor: Dece Fu Njogu
- Successor: Massamba Tako (Cayor), Mamalik Tioro Ndjingèn (Baol)
- Born: early 16th century Palene Ded
- Died: 1593
- Father: Dece Fu Ndiogu Fall
- Mother: Ngoné Sobel Ndiaye
- Religion: Islam

Amary Ngoné Sobel Fall – (or Amari Ngoneh Sobel Faal, or Amari Ngóone Sobel in Wolof) was the second Damel of the independent Kingdom of Cayor in modern-day Senegal. He was responsible for breaking Cayor's vassalage under the Jolof Empire at the battle of Danki in 1549, and reigned until 1593.

Amary Ngoné was the son of Lamane Dece Fu Njogu Fall and Ngoné Sobel Ndiaye, daughter of the Serer Lingeer Sobel Diouf. When Dece Fu fell ill, he failed to send the necessary tribute to their overlord, the Buurba of the Jolof Empire, for several years. In 1549 Amary volunteered to go, leading an army recruited with the help of his maternal uncle Niokhor Ndiaye, Teigne (title) of Baol.

To camouflage his movements Amary Ngoné marched the army east to lake Danki, on the southern edge of Jolof, rather than directly to the imperial capital of Ouarkhokh. He left the bulk of his forces there, heading to Ouarkhokh with only a small group. They buried javelins along the way. When the buurba received them insultingly, Amary Ngoné publicly declared that the Aajor (people of Cayor) had no need for such a chief. Offended, the Jolof-Jolof pursued them, but Amary and his companions kept them at bay thanks to the stashes of ammunition they had left. Arriving at Danki, the full Cayor army ambushed the pursuers and killed the buurba.

Upon his return to Cayor, Amary Ngoné was received with a great feast to celebrate the kingdom's new independence from Jolof. Dece Fu Njogu was acclaimed damel, meaning 'breaker', but during the celebrations was killed when a group of bulls brought to be slaughtered stampeded. Amary was immediately elected damel in his place. Upon his enthronement, he was ritually bathed by Islamic marabouts. Soon after his accession, Amary's uncle died as well, and he was elected Teigne of Baol, the first monarch to hold the dual title.

Amary Ngoné proclaimed a new constitution for the independent Cayor and founded a new, more centrally located capital at Mboul. He repelled multiple invasions from Jolof in the first years of his reign, each time killing the buurba who led them. He also led a force north into the Sahara Desert to chasten the Hassaniya emirs who were raiding south of the Senegal River, reportedly going halfway to Morocco. Amari Ngoné reigned for 44 years. Upon his death in 1593 he was succeeded in Cayor by his son Massamba Tako and in Baol by his nephew Mamalik Tioro Ndjingèn, Massamba's son.
