= Souleymane Faye (linguist) =

Senegalese linguist

Souleymane Faye is a Senegalese professor of linguistics at the Cheikh Anta Diop University (UCAD), current head of the Serer Division at the Centre de linguistique appliquée de Dakar, author of Serer and Cangin languages and a journalist. Himself Serer from the Faye family, he has authored and co-authored several books and papers in Serer, Wolof, French and English. As of 2015, Professor Faye is Head of Seereer and Cangin Languages at the Seereer Resource Centre.

== Selected works ==
- Caq falay a seereer - 1: garaameer a seereer, Volume 1, Centre de Linguistique Appliquee de Dakar (1988)
- Morphologie du verbe sérère, Centre de linguistique appliquée de Dakar (1982)
- Morphologie du nom sérère: système nominal et alternance consonantique, Université de Dakar, Centre de linguistique appliquée de Dakar (1985)
- GLOTTALISEES DU SEREER-SIIN, DU SAAFISAAFI ET DU NOON DU SENEGAL : ETUDE COMPARATIVE DE LA SONORITE,
- Aqatoor a seereer, Nouvelles Editions Africaines (1986) (by Faye, Souleymane (CLAD, Dakar), & Dijkstra, Hillebrand (Société Internationale de Linguistique, Dakar)
- Micro dico, Laboratoire de littérature et civilisation africaines (1996)
