= Teigne =

Title for monarchs of the kingdom of Baol

Serer royal and religious titles
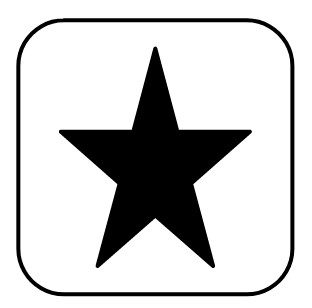
- Royal titles
- Lamane (also religious)
- Maad
- Maad a Sinig
- Maad Saloum
- Teigne
- Lingeer
- Line of succession
- Buumi
- Thilas
- Loul Religious titles
- Saltigue

Teigne (Serer:Teeñ, alternate spellings include Teñ, Teen, Teign, Tègne, Tin, or Tinou) was the title of the monarchs of the pre-colonial Kingdom of Baol, now part of present-day Senegal.

== Etymology and Origin ==
The title "Teigne" was Serer in origin. Senegalese linquist, author, and professor of linguistic at the Cheikh Anta Diop University, Professor Souleymane Faye notes that, the Serer term "foɗeen", which means "milk from the mother's breast", contains the radical "ɗeen", an altered form of "teen" which means "the breast". This refers to the mother and the matrilineage."Tange" is one of the many spelling variations of teigne, teen, or teeñ, and refers to the mother's milk (matrilineage) derived from the Serer word ɗeen, sometimes spelled ƭeen or den. This is the root of the Serer term ƭeen yaay or den yaay which means maternal inheritance or matrilineage.

An alternative Wolof etymology that Teigne mean "support placed on the head" or any article to be placed on the head, is based on patriarchy and somewhat recent, and does not tally with the historical mood of succession in Baol before the Faal family came on the throne—who changed the mood of succession from matrlineality to patrilineality.

== History ==
=== Pre 1549 ===
The first Teignes of Baol were members of the Soninke Wagadou (or Ouagadou) matrilineage had ruled much of the Senegambia region, and included members of the Serer Joof paternal line, such as Boureh Joof (or Bouré Diouf in French speaking Senegal) and Guidiane Joof (probably "Jegan" Joof). The alliance between the Wagadou and the local Serers was similar to the later arrangement between the Serer and Guelowar matrilineage who largely supplanted the Wagadou in the 14th century.

The last Serer king of Baol was Teigne Niokhor Njie (or Teeñ Niokhor Ndiaye), son of Lingeer Sobel Joof, a descendant of Maad Ndaah Njemeh Joof. After his death, he was succeeded by his maternal nephew Amary Ngone Sobel Fall, a member of the Faal royal family of Cayor and Baol but Wagadou as well. After the death of Teigne Niokhor Njie, the Serers completely lost power in Baol.

=== As Independent Rulers ===
The Faal dynasty (or Fall in French), like many of their predecessors, were of Serer origin on the paternal side and Wagadou (Soninke) on the maternal side, but became Wolofized, and saw themselves as Wolofs.

The Kingdom of Baol was part of the Jolof Empire beginning in the 14th century. In 1549, the then-Prince of Cayor Amary Ngone Sobel Fall, assisted by his cousin Prince Manguinak Joof of Baol, launched a rebellion against the Emperor in order to attain independence for their countries. That rebellion culminated in the Battle of Danki in which the Cayor–Baol alliance was victorious. Amary Ngoneh made his cousin Manguinak Jaraaf Baol (equivalent of Prime Minister), and became the first Damel-Teigne, ruler of both states. This arrangement did not last, but many later rulers, including Lat Sukaabe Fall and Lat Dior, also attempted to unite the two kingdoms in a personal union.

The last Teigne of Baol was Tanor Ngone Jeng (or Tanor Goñ Dieng), who reigned from 1890 to 3 July 1894.

== Succession ==
Baol was historically ruled by a maternal dynasty as it was in the Serer Kingdoms of Sine and Saloum. However, kings must come from one of the noble patrilineages, most often than not from the Serer lamanic families.

The Faal paternal dynasty of Baol and Cayor saw a somewhat change in succession, with the emphasis being more on patrilineage than matrilineage, though the kings sought wives from the noble matrilineages such as the Wagadou, Mouïoy, Jaafun, Darobe, etc. The Faal family simply married into the old dynasty and continued the lineage. Although the Serer noble patriclans lost much of their dominance when the Faal family took power through marriage, the Wagadou lasted after 1549 following Danki, but were outsted in the 18th century when Lat Sukabe Ngoneh Jaye Faal took power and imposed his own matrilineage (Geej).

Historically, the Teigne was chosen by a council of electors through a majority vote. These voters were themselves chosen by the "Baol-Baols" (natives of Baol). However, the voters must be descendants of the five great families of Baol, "probably from the original lamanal families" of Baol or "from the agents that the central power had installed in place of these former 'lamanes.'”

== In Senegambian culture ==
The late Serer Diva Yandé Codou Sène pays homage to the Joof family, originally of Baol, by singing the praises of Teigne Yoro Joof in her 1995 track Teñ Yooro Waal Adaam Fañiing Feno Juufeen, from the album Gainde - Voices From the Heart of Africa with Youssou Ndour. On that track, she sang the Teign's bravery, deeds and glory, and referred to him as the "elephant of the Joof family." The term elephant denoting giant i.e., a warrior. She then went on to state that his name, glory and reputation proceeds him. From Paataar, to Ngooxeem, and Mbaqaan, his name can be heard. And after naming certain members of the Joof family, referred to the Teigne as "the darling of the Joof family" — and concluded the track by naming the 19th century King of Sine, Kumba Ndoffene fa Maak Joof, whom he nicknamed "Mbaye" — as per the anthem dedicated to him following his victory against the Muslim marabouts at the Battle of Fandane-Thiouthioune—which was precipitated by the surprised attack at Mbin o Ngor, known as Mbetaan Keur Ngor in Wolof.

== See also ==
- Wagadu (mythology)
- Timeline of Serer history
- History of Senegal
- Takrur

== Bibliography ==
- N'Diaye-Corréard, Geneviève « Teigne », in Les mots du patrimoine : le Sénégal, Archives contemporaines, 2006, p. 160 ISBN 978-2-914610-33-9
- Diop, Papa Samba, « Teigne / Tegne / Tègne », in Glossaire du roman sénégalais, L'Harmattan, 2010, p. 577 ISBN 978-2-296-11508-8
- Klein, Martin A. Islam and Imperialism in Senegal Sine-Saloum, 1847–1914, Edinburgh University Press, 1968, p. 91, 130, 263
- Phillips, Lucie Colvin, Historical dictionary of Senegal, Scarecrow Press, 1981, p. 52–71 ISBN 0-8108-1369-6
- Bulletin de l'Institut fondamental d'Afrique noire, volume 38, 1976, pp. 493, 504-557
- Faye, Souleymane, "Morphologie du nom sérère: système nominal et alternance consonantique." (Issue 10 of Langues nationales au Sénégal). Université de Dakar, Centre de linguistique appliquée de Dakar (1985), p, 22
- Boulegue, Jean (2013). Les royaumes wolof dans l'espace sénégambien (XIIIe-XVIIIe siècle) (in French). Paris: Karthala Editions.
- Kesteloot, Lilyan; Veirman, Anja (2007). "Le mboosé: mythe de fondation et génie protecteur de Kaolack". Bulletin de l'IFAN.
- Fall, Tanor Latsoukabe (1974). "Recueil sur la Vie des Damel". Bulletin de l'Institut fondamental d'Afrique noire. 36 (1).
- Diop, Cheikh Anta, "Towards the African Renaissance: Essays in African Culture & Development 1946-1960." Translated by Egbuna P. Modum. Karnak House (1996), pp. 28–30, ISBN 9780907015857
- "Bulletin de l'Institut fondamental d'Afrique noire." Volume 38, 1976
- Dupire, Marguerite, "Sagesse sereer: Essais sur la pensée sereer ndut, KARTHALA Editions (1994). For den yaay, see p. 116. The book also deals in depth about the Serer matriclans and means of succession through the matrilineal line. See also pages : 38, 95-99, 104, 119-20, 123, 160, 172-74, ISBN 2865374874 (retrieved 29 March 2024)
- Becker, Charles: "Vestiges historiques, trémoins matériels du passé clans les pays sereer", Dakar (1993), CNRS - ORS TO M. (retrieved 29 March 2024)
- Chavane, Bruno A., "Villages de l’ancien Tekrour", Vol. 2, Hommes et sociétés. Archéologies africaines, KARTHALA Editions, 1985, pp. 28–34, 38, ISBN 2-86537-143-3
- Dyao, Yoro, "Légendes et coutumes sénégalaises", Cahiers de Yoro Dyao: publiés et commentés par Henri Gaden. (E. Leroux, 1912), p. 12
- Ngom, Biram, "La question Gelwaar et l’histoire du Siin." Dakar, Université de Dakar, 1987, p 13
