= Damel =

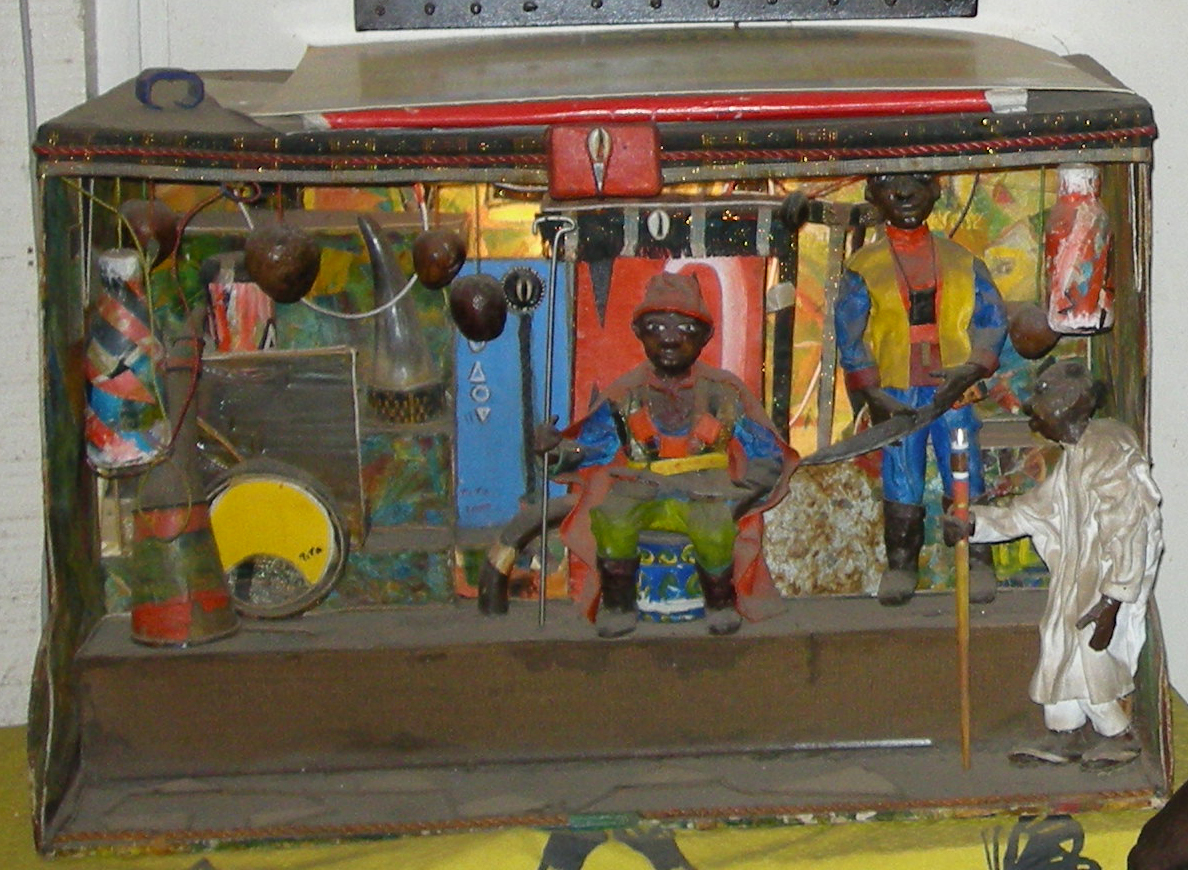
"Theatre in a box", a production by Senegalese artist Amadou Makhtar Mbaye, featuring the visit of the philosopher Kocc Barma Fall to the damel

Damel was the title of the ruler (or king) of the Wolof kingdom of Cayor in what is now northwest Senegal, West Africa.

The most well-known damel is probably Lat Dior Diop (1842–1886) who was killed by the French after decades of resisting their encroachment on Wolof territory. Lat Dior is a Senegalese national hero.

The 30th and last Damel of Cayor, Samba Laobé Fall, was killed by the leader of a French delegation, Captain Spitzer, at Tivaouane, Senegal.

== Role ==
Among the social classes of Cayor, the Damel stood on the top of the hierarchy. The Damel were traditionally seen as great magicians and it was through female relatives that royal blood was transmitted. Every descendant of a Damel in the maternal line became a garmi or noble.

== History ==
The Damel began as the Great Lamane of Cayor, traditionally elected by the other Lamanes from the Fall family of Palene Ded, who claimed descend from Ousmane Boune Afal, a companion of Mohammed, by means of Wagadou. Lat Jor was the only Damel elected who was not part of the Fall paternal line.

The term "Damel" may derive from "breaker", coming from the Wolof verb "damma" meaning "to break," referring to the breaking of their vassalage to the Jolof Empire at the 1549 battle of Danki. Alvise Cadamosto, however, recorded the use of the title "Damel" for the ruler of Cayor much earlier, in the 1450s.

== List of damel ==
The following are the damel of Cayor, in order

- 1549, Dece Fu Njogu
- 1549–1593, Amary Ngone Sobel Fall
- 1593–1600 Massamba Tako
- ??–c.1672 Biram Yacine Bubu
- c. 1672–1673 Decce Maram Ngalgu
- 1673 Ma Faly Gueye
- 1673–?? Makhourediah Jojo Juuf
- 1697–1719, Lat Sukabe
- 1719–1748, Isa-Tende
- 1748–1749, Maissa Bigué Ngoné Fall (1st term)
- 1749–1757, Ma-Bathio Samb
- 1757–1758, Birima Kodu
- 1758–1759, Maissa Bigué Ngoné Fall (2nd term)
- 1759–1760, Birima Yamb
- 1760–1763, Isa Bige Nagone
- 1763–1766, Jor Yasin Isa
- 1766–1777, Kodu Kumba
- 1777–1790, Birima Fatim-Penda
- 1790–1809, Amari Ngone Ndèla Kumba Fal
- 1809–1832, Biram Fatma Cub Fal
- 1832–1855, Maysa Tènde Jor Samba Fal
- 1855–1860, Birima Ngone Latir Fal (d. 1860)
- 1860–1861, Ma-Kodu Kumba Yande Fal
- 1861 May – 1861 Dec 8, Ma-Jojo Jegeñ Kodu Fal (1st term)
- 1862 – 1864 Jan, Lat Jor Ngone Latir Jop (1st term) (b. c.1842, d. 1886)
- 1864 Jan – 1868, Ma-Jojo Jegeñ Kodu Fal (2nd term)
- 1871 Feb 12 – 1882, Lat Jor Ngone Latir Jop (2nd term) (s.a.)
- 1883 Jan – 1883 Aug 28, Amari Ngone Fal
- 1883 Aug 28 – 1886 Oct 6, Samba Laobe Fal
- 1883 Oct 6 – 1902, Meissa Tendi Dior Birima Demba War Sall

== See also ==
- Teign
- Maad a Sinig
- Maad Saloum
- Lingeer
- Buumi
