= Battle of Danki =

Battle between Cayor and Jolof in 1549

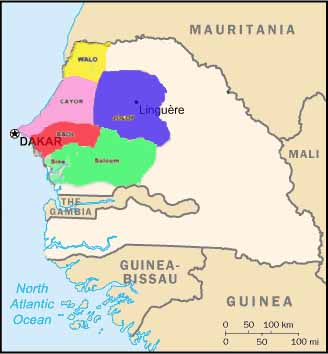
- Jolof Kingdom after its disintegration
Date	1549
Location	Lake Danki, near the border between the Kingdom of Jolof and the Saloum
Result	Cayorian victory

Belligerents
Cayor	Jolof Empire

Commanders and leaders
Amary Ngone Fall; Manginak Diouf	Buurba Léléfoulifak †

The Battle of Danki was a conflict fought in 1549 between the Jolof Empire and Cayor, a rebellious vassal. The decisive victory of the Aajor (people of Cayor) and the death of the reigning Buurba of the empire signaled the end of Jolof hegemony over Cayor, Baol, Saloum, Sine, Wuli, Niani, and Waalo.

The Lamane of Cayor Dece Fu Njogu Fall had failed to send tribute to the Buurba for several years. In 1549 his son Amary volunteered to go, leading an army recruited with the help of his maternal uncle Niokhor Ndiaye, Teigne (title) of Baol.

To camouflage his movements Amary Ngoné marched the army east to lake Danki, 15km south of Taif on the southern edge of Jolof territory, rather than directly to the imperial capital of Ouarkhokh. He left the bulk of his forces there, heading to Ouarkhokh with only a small group. They buried javelins every 2km or so along the way, enough for each soldier in the party. When the buurba Léléfoulifak received them insultingly, Amary Ngoné publicly declared that the Aajor no longer had need for such a chief.

Offended, the Jolof pursued them, with Amary and his companions drawing them towards the stashes of javelins, seeming to replenish their ammunition by magic. Finally drawing them to Danki, the full Cayor army ambushed the pursuers, killed the buurba, and routed the Jolof army.

Upon his return to Cayor, Amary Ngoné was received with a great feast to celebrate the kingdom's new independence from Jolof. Dece Fu Njogu was acclaimed damel, meaning 'breaker', but during the celebrations was killed when a group of bulls brought to be slaughtered stampeded. Amary was immediately elected damel in his place, and fought off several attempts by succeeding buurbas to reassert Jolof hegemony.
