= Baol =

Former kingdom in central Senegal

Kingdom of Baol Baol
- 1549–1894
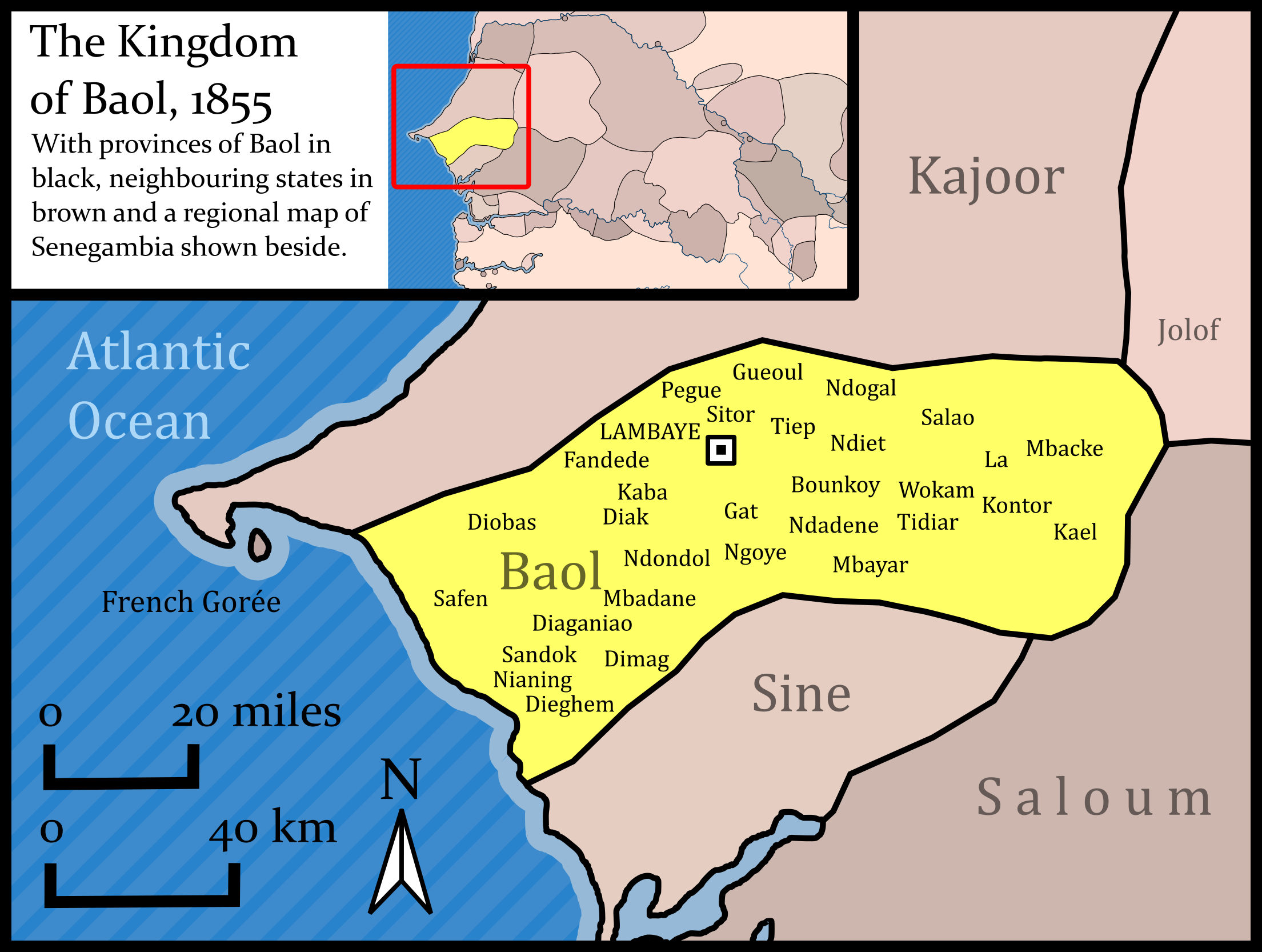
- Baol in 1855
- Capital: Lambaye
- Common languages: Wolof, Serer
- Religion: Serer religion, Islam
- Government: Monarchy
- Teigne
- History
  - Established: Cayor defeats Jolof at Battle of Danki 1549
  - French colonization: 1894
- Currency: Iron bars
Preceded by	Succeeded by
Jolof Empire	French West Africa

Baol or Bawol was a kingdom in what is now central Senegal. Founded in the 11th century, it was a vassal of the Jolof Empire before becoming independent in the mid-16th century. The ruler bore the title of Teigne (or Teeň) and reigned from the capital in Lambaye. The kingdom encompassed a strip of land extending east from the ocean and included the towns of Touba, Diourbel, and Mbacke. It was directly south of the Kingdom of Cayor and north of the Kingdom of Sine.

== History ==
There are no written sources for the early history of Baol, and even oral traditions are sparse. The earliest recorded Teigne of Baol was named Kayamangha Diatta and was a member of the Soninke Wagadu matrilineage, reflecting influence emanating from the Ghana Empire.

Serer people moved into the region in the 11th or 12th century, fleeing Islamization in the Senegal River valley. Wolof groups gradually arrived later. The Wagadu dynasty integrated them into the Baol government. Some early Serer kings included: Kolki Faye; Mbissine Ndoumbé Ngom; Massamba Fambi Ngom; Fambi Langar Ngom; Patar Xole Joof (great-grandson of Maad Ndaah Njemeh Joof).

At some point early in its history, Baol was integrated into the Jolof Empire. The legend of Ndiadiane Ndiaye, the first Buurba Jolof, claims that the ruler of Baol voluntarily submitted to him, but this is likely a later invention to celebrate the unity of the empire. Many of the earliest buurbas came from maternal lineages native to Baol, perhaps benefiting from the prestigious historical memory of Ghana. Some even used Lambaye as an imperial residence.

The Portuguese began trading on the coast of Baol in the 15th century, bringing primarily horses and iron.

Amary Ngoné Sobel Fall, Damel of Cayor, and his cousin Maguinak Joof of Baol fought together at the Battle of Danki (1549), where they defeated the Emperor of Jolof and won independence. Fall became the first Damel-Teign, reigning over both kingdoms in a personal union and founding the Fall dynasty. This arrangement resurfaced periodically throughout the history of the two states, with frequent wars between them. Fall was son of Lingeer Ngoneh Sobel Njie and the maternal grandson of Lingeer Sobel Joof, making him a descendant of the ancient Baol royal house of Maad Ndaah Njemeh Joof.

Around the turn of the 16th century, Baol, still largely Serer and animist and under the reign of Teigne Mafane Thiaw, was invaded by the nominally Islamic Cayor. Defeated in battle, some of the priests of Baol took refuge with the Maad Saloum, founding the city of Kaolack.

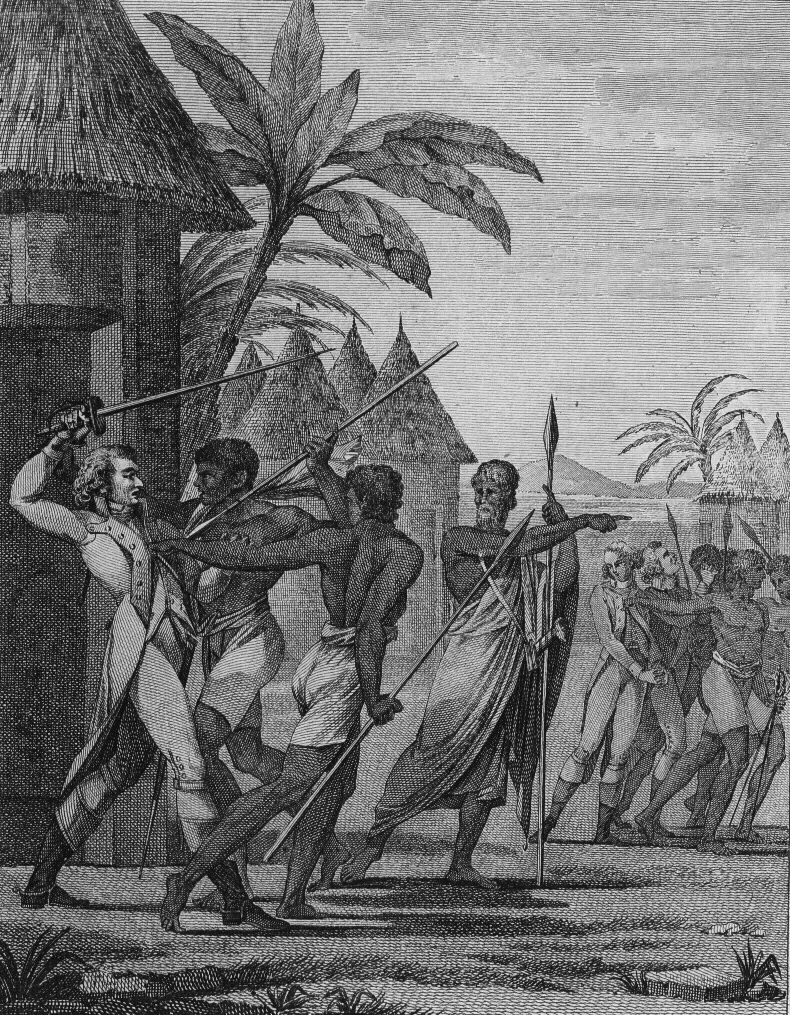
The arrest of French governor Andre Brue on the orders of Damel-Teigne Lat Sukaabe.

In 1697 Teigne Lat Sukaabe Fall conquered Cayor and built a powerful, centralized state backed by a military armed with firearms. Upon his death, however, he deeded each kingdom to a separate son, and the rivalry between them continued. During the 18th century, Damel Maïsa Teindde Ouédji of Cayor annexed Baol, but the kingdom was embroiled in a succession dispute after his death. Baol regained its independence in 1756.

The French conquest of Baol began in 1859 under Governor Louis Faidherbe. Most of Baol was conquered by 1874, but complete control of the former kingdom was only established in 1895 when it was divided into two provinces. Under colonialism, Mouridism, whose founder Amadou Bamba was a Baol-Baol, spread widely in the region.

== Government ==
The social and political systems were basically the same as those of its larger neighbor, Cayor. The government was composed of the great electors who selected the Teigne, a crown-slave bureaucracy directly under the king, and representatives of each of the dependent communities (pastoralists, fishermen, clergy, castes and women).

Baol was ruled by a mixed dynasty: the Wagadu maternal lineage (from the Ghana Empire) along with the Serer paternal dynasties of N'Gom (or Ngum), Thiaw, Joof or Diouf, and Faye. The heir to the throne was given the title of Thialao, and ruled over the province of Salao.

== Economy and Society ==
Baol was famous for its horses. It had unique breeds, which were faster and more robust than most of the horses on the plain. The kingdom's primary seaports were at Saly Portudal and Mbour, giving the nobles access to imported luxuries and firearms that they purchased with slaves raided from outlying villages or in war.

Baol was a Wolof kingdom, but included large communities of Serer-Safen and other Serer groups. Natives of Baol are known as 'Baol-Baol', a common formulation in Senegal (e.g. Saloum-Saloum, Waalo-Waalo, etc.)

== List of kings ==
Rulers marked (DT) reigned as Damel-Teigne over both Baol and Cayor.

- Niokhor (c. 1550–c. 1560)
- Amary Ngone Sobel Fall (c. 1560–1593) (DT)
- Mamalik Thioro (1593–c. 1605) (DT?)
- Lat Ndella Parar (c. 1605–c. 1620)
- Tié N'Della (c. 1620–c. 1665)
- Tié Kura (short reign)
- M'Bissan Kura (short reign)
- Tiande (short reign)
- M'Bar (c. 1669–c. 1690)
- Tié Yaasin Demba (c. 1690–c. 1693)
- Tié Tieumbeul (c. 1693–1697)
- Lat Sukaabe (1697–1719) (DT)
- Mali Kumba Dyaring (1719)
- Ma-Kodu Kumba (1719–1749) (DT)
- Mawa (1749–c. 1752) (DT)
- M'Bissan N'Della (c. 1752–c. 1758)
- Ma-Kodu Kumba (c. 1758–1777)
- Amari Ngone Ndela Diaring (1778-87, 1790-1809)
- Biram Fatim Penda (1787-1790) (DT)
- Amari Ngone Ndela Diaring (1778-87, 1790-1809)
- Tié-Yaasin Dieng (1809–1815)
- Amadi Dyor (1815–c. 1822)
- Birayma Fatma (c. 1822–1832) (DT)
- Isa Tein-Dyor (1832–1855)
- Tié-Yaasin N'Gone (1855–c. 1857)
- Ma-Kodu Kodu Kumba (c. 1857–1859)
- Mali Kumba N'Gone (1859–1862)
- Tié-Yaasin Gallo (1862–1890)
- Tanor Gogne (1890–3 July 1894)

== See also ==
- Joof family
- Faye family

== Sources ==
- Boulegue, Jean (2013). Les royaumes wolof dans l'espace sénégambien (XIIIe-XVIIIe siècle) (in French). Paris: Karthala Editions.
- Clark, Andrew Francis; Philips, Lucie Colvin (1994). Historical Dictionary of Senegal (2nd. ed.). London: Scarecrow Press.
