= Diourbel region =

Region of Senegal

Diourbel region Région de Diourbel (French) Diiwaanu Njaaréem (Wolof)
- Region
- Location of Diourbel in Senegal

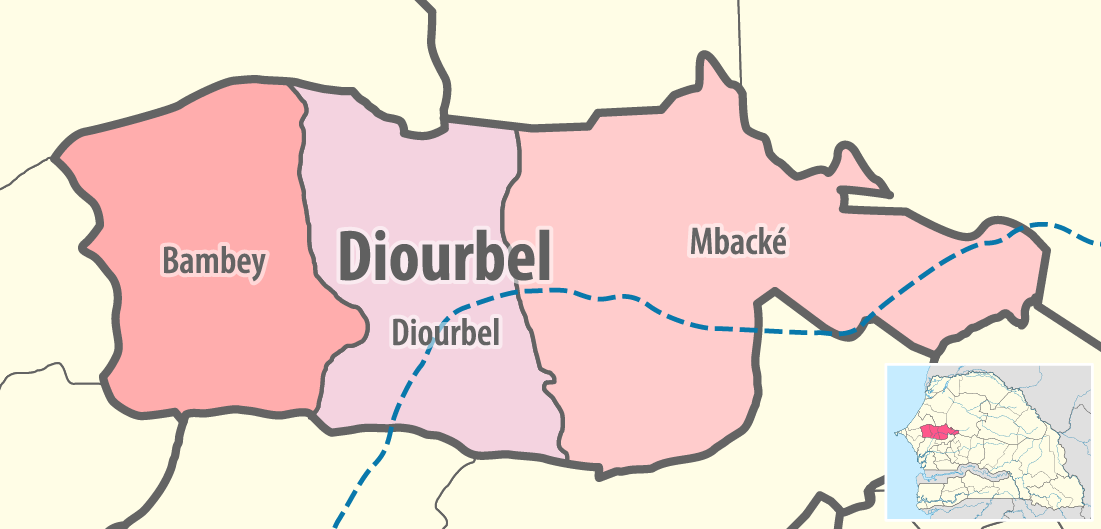
- Diourbel région, divided into 3 départements
- Coordinates: 14°45′N 16°15′W
- Country: Senegal
- Capital: Diourbel
- Départements: List: Bambey; Diourbel; Mbacké

Area
  - Total: 4,824 km^{2} (1,863 sq mi)

Population (2023 census)
  - Total: 2,080,811
  - Density: 431.3/km^{2} (1,117/sq mi)
- Time zone: UTC±00:00 (GMT)
- HDI (2017): 0.398 low

The Diourbel region (Serer and Cangin: Jurbel) is a region of Senegal with 2,080,811 inhabitants (2023). The regional capital is the city of Diourbel, and the largest city is Touba. The region corresponds roughly to the precolonial Kingdom of Bawol and is still called by that name. Bawol (or Baol) is an ancient kingdom formerly ruled by the Joof family, one of the members of the Serer ethnic group found in Senegambia. Inhabitants of the area are called Bawol-Bawol which takes its name from the Serer mode of pluralisation, other examples being: Sine-Sine or Siin-Siin (inhabitants of Sine), Saloum-Saloum (inhabitants of Saloum), etc. The population is primarily comprised by the Serer people especially those from the Cangin group, the Safene in particular. The Serers are believed to be the original inhabitants of this area. The Wolof and other ethnic groups are also present. The Diourbel Region is rich in history and it is where the Cekeen Tumuli are located. Scholars such as Charles Becker, Henry Gravrand, and Victor Martin suggest that these monuments were built by the Serer people and form part of the Serer tumulus of Baol (see also Senegambian stone circles). They are some of the most sacred sites in Serer religion. Mbacké department also includes Mouride Islamic Sufi order's holy city of Touba. The installation of this order in Serer country is a controversial one, especially among those Serers who adhere to the tenets of Serer religion (see Serer history (medieval era to present). However, some Serers are also Muslims and have headed this religious order.

== Départements ==
The Diourbel region is composed of three départements:

- Bambey département
- Diourbel département
- Mbacké département
