= Faye family =

African clan

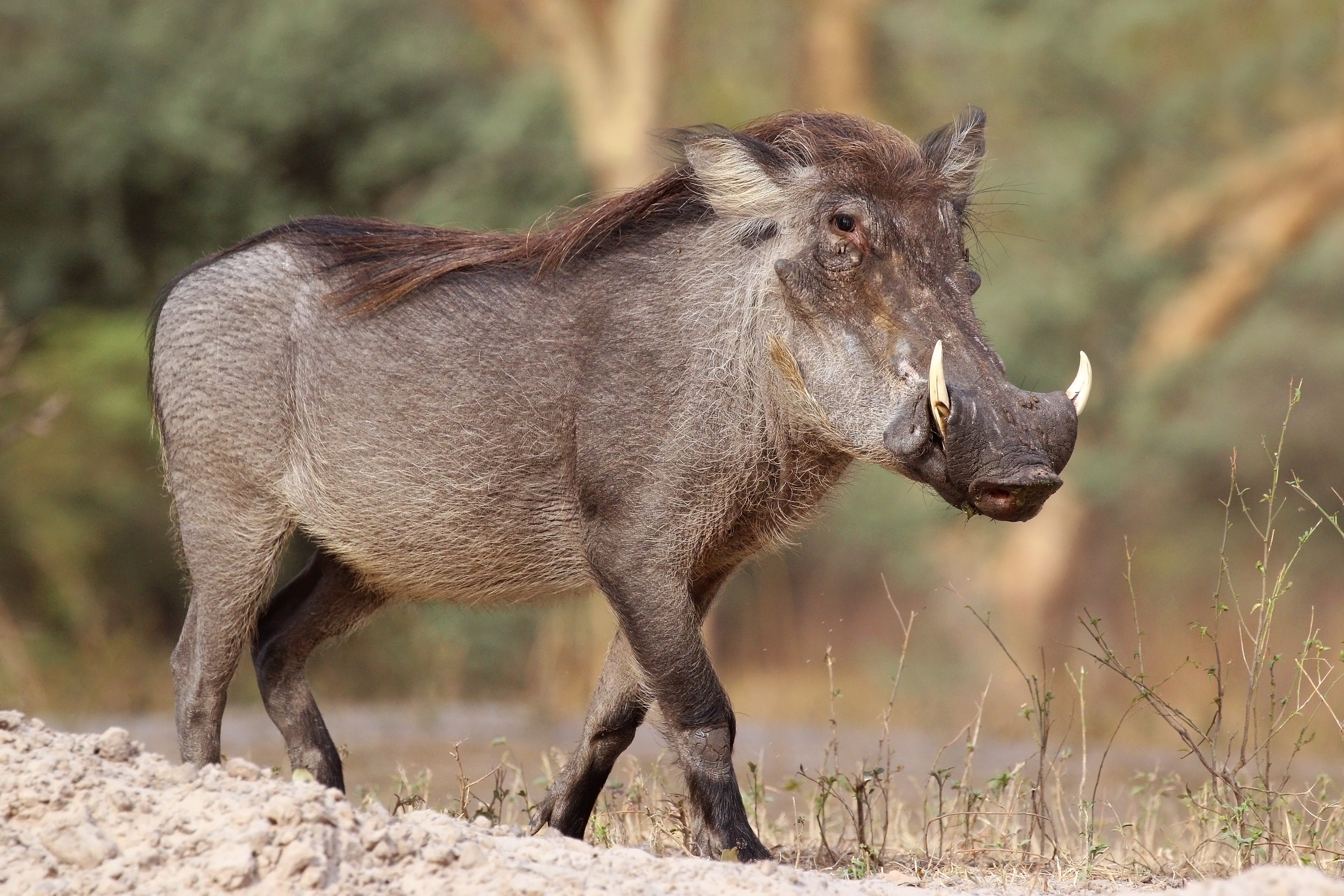
- The totem and symbol of the Faye family is the African warthog, symbolizing courage and leadership in Serer mythology.
- Country: Kingdom of Sine (present-day Senegal)
- Founder: Boukar Djillakh Faye (14th century, c. 1335)
- Final ruler: Maad a Sinig Sanmoon Faye (King of Sine, 1871–1878) was the last king from this family to rule in Sine. The last king of Sine was Maad a Sinig Mahecor Joof (died 1969)
- Titles: Lamane; Maad; Maad a Sinig; Buumi; Thilas; Loul
- Dissolution: 1969 — death of the last kings of Sine and Saloum

The patronym Faye (Serer: Fay) is one of the typical surnames of the Serer people of Senegal, the Gambia and Mauritania. In French-speaking Senegal and Mauritania, and English-speaking Gambia, the surname is spelled Faye.

This Serer surname is unrelated to the similar given name or surname in the Western world. They are also pronounced differently.

The name of their clan is Fayeen. The history of the Faye family is linked to Serer medieval history and Serer royalty. During the Guelowar period (the last maternal dynasty in the Serer kingdoms), the Faye family provided many of the kings of Sine. This family's biggest rival to the throne of Sine were the Joof family, with whom they have a long joking relationship according to Serer and Senegambian culture.

== History ==
The early history of the Faye family goes back to Lamanic times, however they did not achieve particular fame and notoriety until the 14th century. The Faye family that had ruled the pre-colonial kingdoms of Sine trace descent to Boukar Djillakh Faye (variation: Bougar Birame Faye), an early 14th-century professional wrestler called njom in Serer and patriarch of this patriclan. In the early 14th century, Boukar Djillakh Faye was regarded as one of the best wrestlers in Serer country. The Guelowar princess Lingeer Tening Jom was given to him in marriage. Tening Jom was the niece of Maysa Wali who later became a Maad a Sinig (title for the king of Sine) — ruling from c. 1350–1370. From that marriage, they had several children including Tasse Faye (or Tassé Faye, the first from this family to rule Sine as Maad a Sinig during this era) and Waagaan Tening Jom Faye (the king with at least 24 children including 9 daughters) — one of the better known kings from this family. Dinned into Senegambian and Serer history, the Faye family, like their Joof counterparts are one of few Senegambian families that have a family anthem (boom). The name of their anthem is "Waagaan Koumbassandiane", (proper: Waagaan Kumbasaanjaan) who actually was a medieval king of Sine (Maad a Sinig Waagaan Kumbasaanjaan Faye) reported to be one of the longest reigning kings of Sine and ancestor of this family. This family's anthem forms part of the overture of the Epic of Sanmoon Faye, which relates the history and deeds of Maad a Sinig Sanmoon Faye, the controversial king of Sine who succeeded Maad a Sinig Kumba Ndoffene Famak Joof in 1871. Their family totem is the African warthog (called "ruul a koб" in Serer, variation: "ruul-a-koƥ") — (previously grouped with the boar). In the early part of the Guelowar dynastic period (1350–1969), the Faye paternal dynasty was dominant in Sine, providing many of the Serer kings. However they were eventually overtaken by the Joof family who provided more kings of Sine, even from the 19th century to 1969. Notwithstanding the rivalries between these two patriclans, alliances were formed on certain occasions in order to repulse those they perceived as the greater enemy. One of these medieval alliances was between Maad a Sinig Diessanou Faye and Jaraff Boureh Gnilane Joof (founder of the Royal House of Boureh Gnilane Joof). That historical alliance was brought about when the Muslim marabout—Mohammadou of Koungo launched jihad in the Sine, threatening the survival of Serer religion in the country. Diessanou Faye, who was on the throne of Sine requested the assistance of the Joof family. Assistance was granted, with the Joof clan led by Boureh Gnilane Joof (son of the warlord king of Laah and conqueror of Baol - Maad Patar Kholleh Joof). The Joof—Faye alliance led to the defeat the Muslim army. For his part in achieving victory, Boureh Gnilane was made Jaraff (equivalent of prime minister) and given the sister of Diessanou Faye (Lingeer Gnilane Faye) in marriage.

=== Historical battles involving this family ===
The table below lists some historical battles in Senegambia involving the kings or princes from this patriclan :

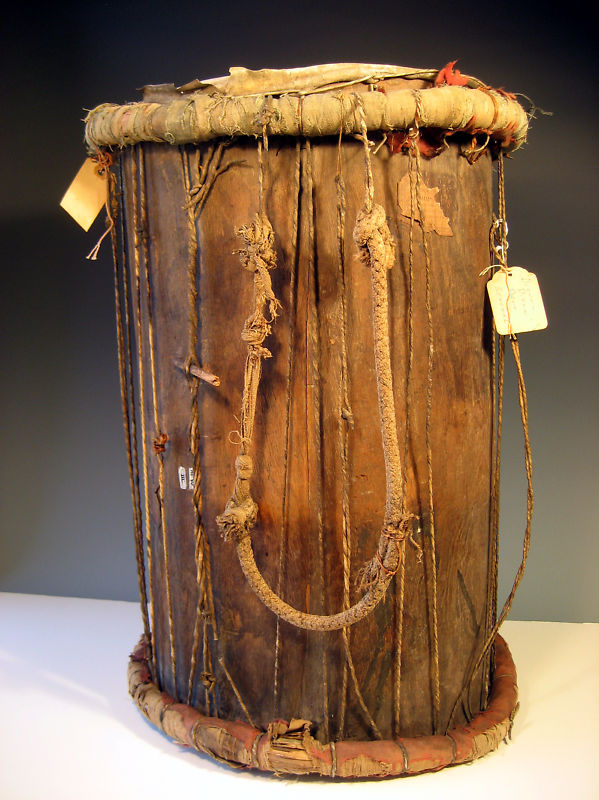
The Junjung: the Serer war drum of Sine (19th century)

Name of the battle	Member of the clan	Opponent	Reason for the battle	Victor
The Battle of Kalikounda*	Maad a Sinig Waagaan Tening Jom Faye	The Mandinka marabout of Kalikounda (believed to be in the present day village of Malikounda)	Religious war	Maad a Sinig Waagaan Tening Jom Faye was victorious. He is also reported to have had the marabouts' alwa (or alwah — religious tablets) destroyed.
One of many Serer-Marabout Wars of the 14th and 15th centuries	Maad a Sinig Diessanou Faye Jaraff Boureh Gnilane Joof (assisting the Maad a Sinig, the Joof-Faye alliance)	The marabout – Mohammadou of Koungo (in the east of Saloum around Koungheul)	A religious war due to a jihadic expedition launched in Sine by the Muslim forces.	Maad a Sinig Diessanou Faye, Jaraff Boureh Gnilane Joof and the Joof-Faye ally forces.
The Battle of Ngaskop	Maad a Sinig Latsouk Faniame Faye The people of Dieghem	The criminals of Dieghem and Diohine (robbers and murderers)	This battle was between the people who adhere to the laws of the land against those who use murder and robbery to achieve their goal. It was a battle where the good citizens attempted to take back their country, led by their king and his army.	Maad a Sinig Latsouk Faniame Faye and the good people of Dieghem.
The Battle of Ndoffène	Maad a Sinig Njaak Faye	The Sandigue Ndiob Niokhobai Joof (The warlord)	The Sandigue Ndiob Niokhobai Joof entered this battle to secure the succession of his young son Maad a Sinig Ama Joof Gnilane Faye Joof	The Sandigue Ndiob Niokhobai Joof
The Battle of Logandème	Many members of this family. Allied with Maad a Sinig Kumba Ndoffene Famak Joof	Louis Faidherbe (French governor of Senegal) Émile Pinet-Laprade	Resistance against French colonialism	France
The Surprise of Mbin o Ngor (This was not an open battle but a surprise attack, also known as Mbeetan Keur Ngor).	Many members of this family. Allied with Maad a Sinig Kumba Ndoffene Famak Joof	Maba Diakhou Bâ, Damel-Teigne Lat Jor Ngoneh Latir Jobe and their Marabout armies	Religion, vendetta and empire building	Indecisive. The marabout army withdrew when reinforcement finally arrived, but caused severe damage before retreating.
The Battle of Fandane-Thiouthioune (also known as The Battle of Somb)	Many members of this family including Mbange Som Faye. Allied with Maad a Sinig Kumba Ndoffene Famak Joof (the Serer forces)	Maba Diakhou Bâ, Damel-Teigne Lat Jor Ngoneh Latir Jobe and their Marabout armies	Religion, vendetta and empire building	Maad a Sinig Kumba Ndoffene Famak Joof (Serer ally forces)

=== Genealogy ===
This abbreviated genealogy shows the descendants of Boukar Djillakh Faye.

Descendants of Boukar Djillakh Faye

                                     Boukar Djillakh Faye    = Lingeer Tening Jom
                                     of Djillakh (Dieghem)   │    queen mother
          ___________________________________________________│_________________________________________
         │                                      │                              │                       │
    Maad a Sinig Tasse Faye        Maad a Sinig Waagaan Tening Jom Faye     Mabane Faye         Lingeer Gnilane Faye
   (Maad a Sinig, king of Sine)            (king of Sine)                (prince of Sine)       (princess of Sine)
            reigned 1370                         │
                                                 │__
 ___________________________________________________│_____________________________________________________________________
 │                 │                   │                  │                      │                          │             │
Mba Waagaan Faye  Ndougou Waagaan Faye Yakis Waagaan Faye Karabel Waagaan Faye   Biram Jakar Waagaan Faye*  Ngom Waagaan  │
                                         _______________________________________________│                       Faye      │
                                         │                                                                                │
             ____________________________│       _________________________________________________________________________│
             │                                   │
             │  _________________________________│_____________________________________________________________________
   __________│ │                 │                       │                         │                 │                 │
   │           │           Khanjang Waagaan Faye    Njein Waagaan Faye      Lassouk Waagaan Faye     Jokel           Koly
   │       Toma Waagaan Faye                                                                         Waagaan Faye    Mbeggaan
   │_________________                                                                                                Faye
                     │
                     │
   Maad a Sinig Waagaan Kumba Saanjaan Faye
                (king of Sine)

* It is his name people cite when they make a short praise to the Faye family, i.e. "Fay Biram" which may signify, "Faye! From the line Biram." For the Joof family, it is the name of Maad a Sinig Niokhobai Mane Nyan Joof they recite, i.e. "Juufa Niokhobai Samba Lingeer" (var. Dioufa Niokhobaye), which means "Joof! The great nobles." These short family poems or proverbs are called lastangol la (or ndakantal) in Serer.

== Status in Serer religion ==
The Faye family's involvement in Serer religion is linked to the Pangool (the Serer saints and ancestral spirits). During the reign of Maad a Sinig Waasila Faye (in the fifteenth century), the Fangool Laga Ndong was canonized king of the Pangool (singular: Fangool). Between c. 1750–1763, the then king of Sine — Maad a Sinig Boukar Tjilas Mahe Soum Joof is reported to have come into conflict with the Fangool Tamba Faye (the "great Fangool of Ndiob").

== In Senegambian culture ==
- The Senegalese artist Youssou N'Dour himself of Serer heritage dedicated his 1985 track Wagane Faye to this family. In that song, he recite the genealogy of this family with particularly emphasis on the branch of Waagaan Faye (i.e. Maad a Sinig Waagaan Tening Jom Faye).
- Yandé Codou Sène, the late Serer Diva, sings the deeds of Maad a Sinig Waasila Faye in her song Moon and that of Maad a Sinig Sanmoon Faye (also called Salmon Faye) from her 1997 album (Night Sky in Sine Saloum) — Salmon Fay, which she sang in a cappella.

== Serer personalities with the surname Faye or Fay ==
The following list is a sample of those personalities who are ethnically Serers of Senegal, the Gambia and Mauritania pertaining to the Serer patronym Faye or Fay :

=== Royalty ===
==== Kingdom of Sine ====
- Maad a Sinig Waagaan Tening Jom Faye
- Maad a Sinig Wassyla Faye (or Wassila Faye)
- Maad a Sinig Diessanou Faye
- Lingeer Gnilane Faye, sister of Maad a Sinig Diessanou Faye and wife of Jaraff Boureh Gnilane Joof
- Maad a Sinig Waagaan Kumbasaanjaan Faye
- Maad a Sinig Laasuk Fanaan Faye
- Lingeer-Awo Yandeh Mbouna Faye, first wife of Maad Semou Njekeh Joof (founder of the Royal House of Semou Njekeh Joof). She was princess of Sine later the queen mother.
- Lingeer Gnilane Faye, she is the mother of Maad a Sinig Njaak Faye (from her first marriage) as well as the mother Maad a Sinig Ama Joof Gnilane Faye Joof (from her second marriage to the warlord Sandigue Ndiob Niokhobaye Joof). This queen mother was highly involved in the political affairs of Sine. The Battle of Ndoffène was a family crisis for Lingeer Gnilane, because it involved her second husband from the family Joof fighting for the succession of their youngest son (Ama Joof) against her eldest son Njaak Faye who was the king of Sine. Maad a Sinig Njaak Faye was defeated and killed in that battle.
- Maad a Sinig Sanmoon Faye (var: Sanoumon Faye, sometimes called Salmon Faye) – reigned 1871–1878 A controversial king regarded as a great warrior king, but also viewed by his notables as a wicked king. When his notables headed by the Farba—Mbar Yandé Ndiaye Faye (his general) called his nephew Semou Maak Joof (the future king of Sine whom Sanmoon previously defeated and driven out of Sine) to help them defeat Maad a Sinig Sanmoon Faye, he sought French protection and practically ceded to the French the sovereignty of Sine, though he never kept to the terms of the treaty. There was little support from the French. It was during and after his reign that the Kingdom of Sine was ravaged with dynastic struggles, where the kings succeeded one another at an astounding rate.

==== Jolof ====
- Lingeer Gnilane Faye (of Sine), she was married off to the Njie royal family of Jolof, some of which later settled in Saloum. Her son Waljojo (or Waldiodio) did become king of Sine.

=== Academia ===
- Louis Diène Faye (born 1936), Senegalese scholar of Serer religion and history
- Souleymane Faye, Senegalese professor of linguistics and author on Serer and Cangin languages

=== Politics ===
- Caroline Faye Diop (1923–1992), a Senegalese politician during the First and Second Republic. Daughter of Diène Faye and wife of Demba Diop (the Senegalese minister).
- Saliou Diodj Faye (1941 - ), a Senegalese ambassador to the United Kingdom (1976 - 1980) and to Canada (1980 - 1986).
- Marieme Faye Sall, the current First Lady of Senegal.
- Bassirou Diomaye Diakhar Faye, the current President of Republic of Senegal.

=== Military ===
- Farba Mbar Yandé Ndiaye Faye, the general and commander of the Sine army during the reign of Maad a Sinig Sanmoon Faye. He wrote a letter to the French in 1876 relaying the cruelty of the king of Sine.
- Waly Faye (1933 - 1997), General of the senior army corps commander of the national gendarmerie and director of military justice. Grand Chancellor of the National Order of the Lion
- Mbaye Faye (born 1948), Senegalese field officer and colonel
- Leopold M'Bar Faye: Senegalese field officer and colonel

=== Art and entertainment ===
- Safi Faye (born 1943), Senegalese film director and ethnologist
- Abdala Faye (born 1971), Senegalese mixed media artist
- Mbaye Dieye Faye, Senegalese singer and percussionist
- Habib Faye, a Senegalese bassist, keyboardist, composer and grammy-nominated producer

=== Sport ===
- Fary Faye (born 1974), Senegalese footballer
- Ibrahima Faye (born 1979), Senegalese footballer
- Maodomalick Faye (born 1987), Senegalese footballer
- Abdoulaye Faye (born 1978), Senegalese football
- Amdy Faye (born 1977), Senegalese football
- Pape Omar Faye (born 1987), Senegalese football
- Mathieu Faye (born 1958), a former Senegalese basketball player
- Mouhammad Faye (born 1985), a Senegalese basketball player
- Gnima Faye (born 1985), a Senegalese track and field athlete
- Khadim Faye (born 1970), a former Senegalese goalkeeper
- Apollo Faye (born 1951), basketball player originally from Senegal
- Ibou Faye (born 1969), Senegalese 400 metres hurdler
- Mareme Faye a Senegalese swimmer

=== Assassins ===
- Abdou N'Daffa Faye (died 1967), a reported assassin (o pôbôm in Serer) charged with the assassination of a Senegalese politician in 1967. He was found guilty and sentenced to death.

== See also ==
- Maad Saloum
- Teigne (title)
- Loul
- Thilas
- Timeline of Serer history

== Bibliography ==
- Sarr, Alioune, "Histoire du Sine-Saloum", (Sénégal), Introduction, bibliographie et notes par Charles Becker. Version légèrement remaniée par rapport à celle qui est parue en 1986-87
- Diouf, Niokhobaye. "Chronique du royaume du Sine", Suivie de notes sur les traditions orales et les sources écrites concernant le royaume du Sine par Charles Becker et Victor Martin. (1972). Bulletin de l'Institut Fondamental d'Afrique Noire, Tome 34, Série B, n° 4, (1972)
- Lamoise, LE P., "Grammaire de la langue sérère avec des exemples et des exercises renfermant des documents très utiles", Imprimerie de la Mission (1873)
- Muséum national d'histoire naturelle (France). Laboratoire d'ethnobotanique et d'ethnozoologie, Centre national de la recherche scientifique (France), "Journal d'agriculture traditionnelle et de botanique appliquée: JATBA., Volumes 32–33", Laboratoire d'ethnobotanique et d'ethnozoologie, Muséum national d'histoire naturelle (1985), p 233
- "L’EPOPEE DE SANMOON FAY", [in] Éthiopiques n°54 revue semestrielle de culture négro-africaine, Nouvelle série volume 7 2e semestre 1991 (in French) (Retrieved 14 August 2012)
- Fata Ndiaye, "La saga du peuple sérère et l'Histoire du Sine", in Éthiopiques revue, numéro 54, vol. 7, 2^{e} semestre 1991 (in French)
- Gravrand, Henry, "La Civilisation Sereer – Pangool", vol.2, Les Nouvelles Editions Africaines du Senegal, (1990), ISBN 2-7236-1055-1
- Sarr, Benjamin Sombel, "Sorcellerie et univers religieux chrétien en Afrique", l'Harmattan (2008), p 19, ISBN 2296059163
