= Canarian wrestling =

Form of folk wrestling from the Canary Islands

Canarian Wrestling
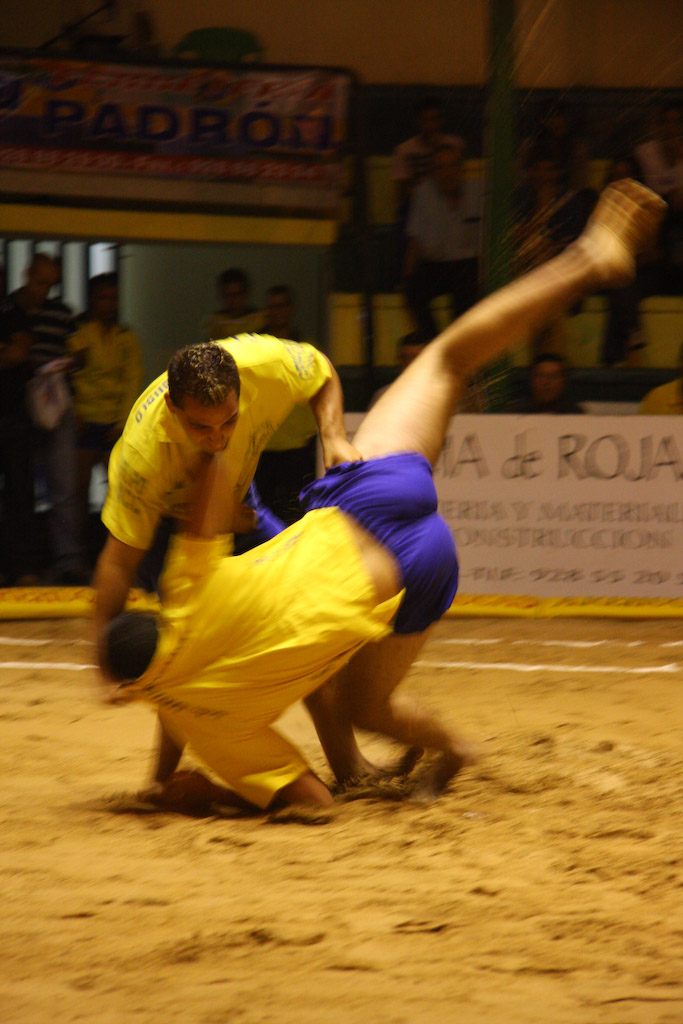
- Lucha Canaria (Canarian wrestling)
- Also known as: Lucha canaria
- Focus: Grappling
- Country of origin: Spain
- Creator: Various
- Parenthood: Ancient Guanche Wrestling
- Olympic sport: No

Canarian Wrestling is a form of folk wrestling, originally from the Canary Islands, where it is known as lucha canaria.

== Description ==
Wrestlers start in the middle of a sand circle, called terrero. The aim is to make their opponent touch the sand with any part of their body, except the feet. To accomplish this, they use different techniques called mañas to throw their opponent off balance. Two falls are required to win a bout. A match ends when all the members of one team have been defeated.

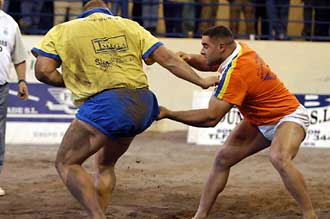
Canarian wrestling

== History ==
Canarian wrestling comes from the history of the Guanches, the earliest known natives of the Canary Islands, although with limited contact between the islands, each island then developed different rules.

In 1420, shortly after the Spanish conquest, Alvar García de Santa María first recorded the wrestling techniques, including the use of referees, or hombres de honor (men of honor). Only some of these early rules and techniques have survived to modern times. After the conquest, the sport became part of the islands’ folklore, only usually being fought at celebrations or local festivals.

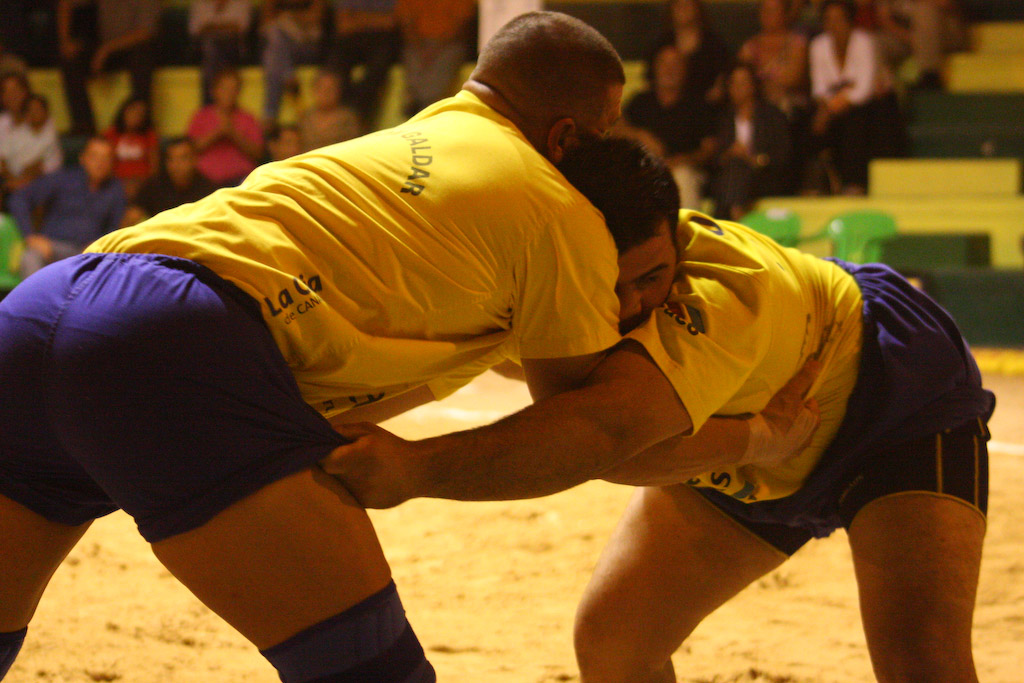
Lucha Canaria (Canarian wrestling)

The rules were first laid down in 1872, making it one of the earliest defined forms of wrestling. In the 1940s several provincial federations were formed, leading to formation of the Federación Española de Lucha in 1984. As it needs a sand circle, lucha is usually fought on special pitches, and important matches, particularly inter-island contests, are covered by local Canarian TV.

The Canarian migration route has brought migrant teenagers familiarised with West African Lutte Traditionnelle including Senegalese, Mali and Mauritanian wrestling into Canarian clubs as a form of migrant integration.

== Techniques ==
Mañas, moves, or series of moves, can be divided in three groups. Punching, hitting and strangling is not permitted.

- Grasping: The wrestler may grasp any part of the opponent's body to try to un-balance and knock down the opponent.
- Block: The wrestler can block a move by his opponent, and use his strength to un-balance his opponent.
- Deflect: The wrestler can move his body to deflect a move by his opponent, and use the opponent's strength to un-balance him.
