= Joal-Fadiouth =

- Town and commune
- Location within Senegal
- Coordinates: 14°10′N 16°50′W
- Country: Senegal
- Region: Thiès Region
- Department: M'Bour

Area
  - Town and commune: 17.34 km^{2} (6.70 sq mi)

Population (2023 census)
  - Town and commune: 61,582
  - Density: 3,551/km^{2} (9,198/sq mi)
- Time zone: UTC+0 (GMT)

Joal-Fadiouth is a town and urban commune in the Thiès Region at the end of the Petite Côte of Senegal, south-east of Dakar.

Joal lies on the mainland, while Fadiouth, linked by a bridge, lies on an island of clam shells, which are also used in local architecture and crafts. The village has no motorised transport evidenced by the sign on entering. It has large Christian and Muslim populations with cemeteries on another shell island. Another attraction is granaries on stilts in the water. The population of the commune in 2013 was some 46,000.

== History ==
While the origin of the village remains disputed, the establishment of the Serer in the area is assumed to have begun when the advance of the Almoravids in the 11th century forced them to leave the Sénégal River valley, occupying the Petite Côte and the region of the Sine River. Another theory claims that Joal and Fadiouth have been founded by the Guelowar when they were expelled from the kingdom of Kaabu. Both of these theories draw on the frequency of certain surnames as evidence, indicating families' ethnic origins.

During the colonial period, Joal became one of the largest trading posts in Western Senegal. By the late 16th century, Dutch and Portuguese traders were both established there, as well as further up the coast in Saly. Until around 1635, a community of Portuguese Jewish traders lived in the village. Protected by the local chief, they were allowed to openly profess their religion, to the annoyance of the Portuguese (Catholic) government.

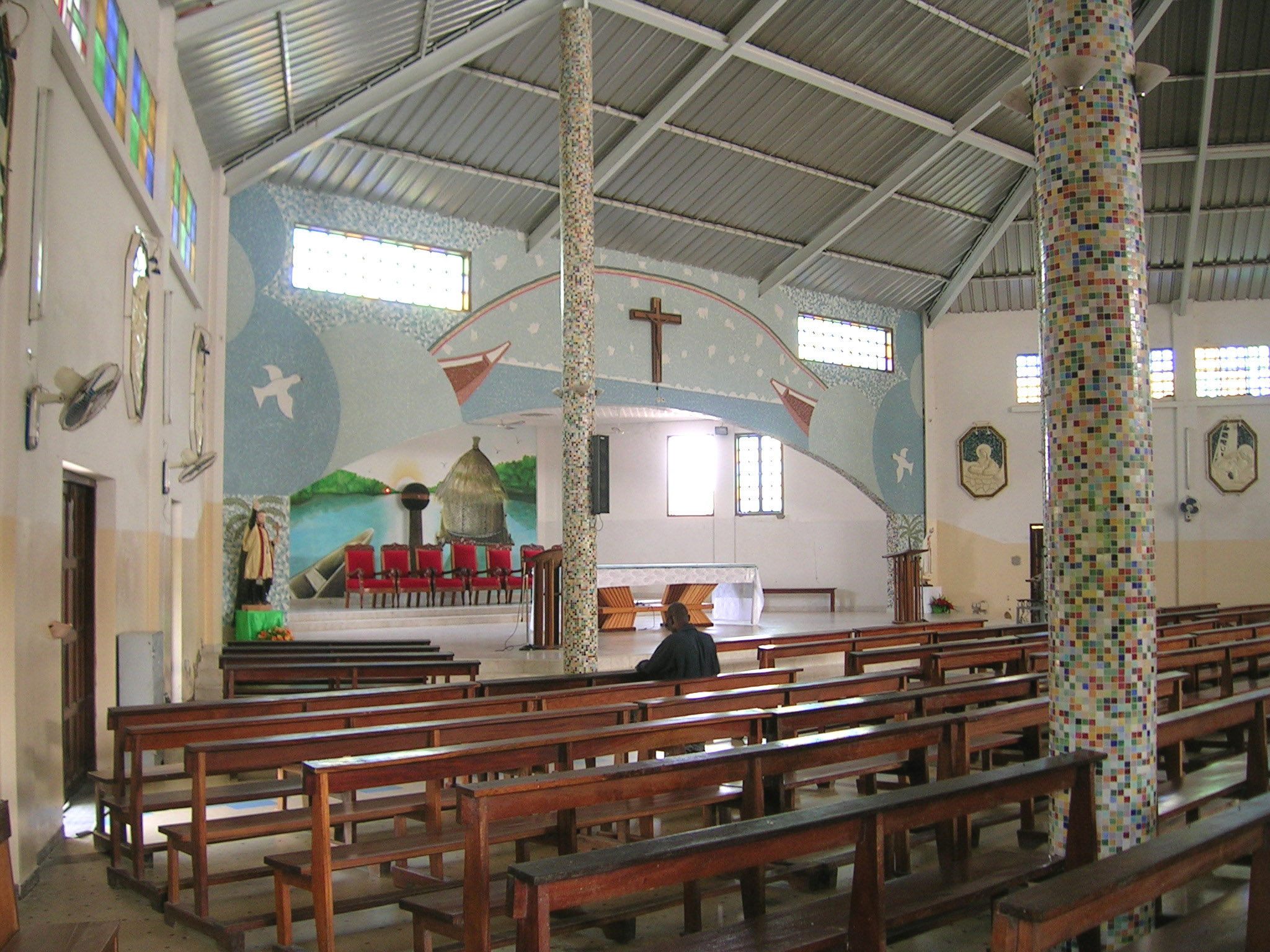
The church of Fadiouth

The establishment of European posts in the region enabled penetration by missionaries as early as the 17th century. The proselytisation however was met by strong resistance by the local population, delaying large-scale evangelising by the Europeans to the 19th century when Senegal became a French colony. In 1850, a mission was finally established in the village, the first priest was ordained there in 1885.

It was during that time that the passage of El Hadj Umar Tall was commemorated by building a mosque. The architectural legacy recalling this passing is at risk of deterioration.

== Administration ==
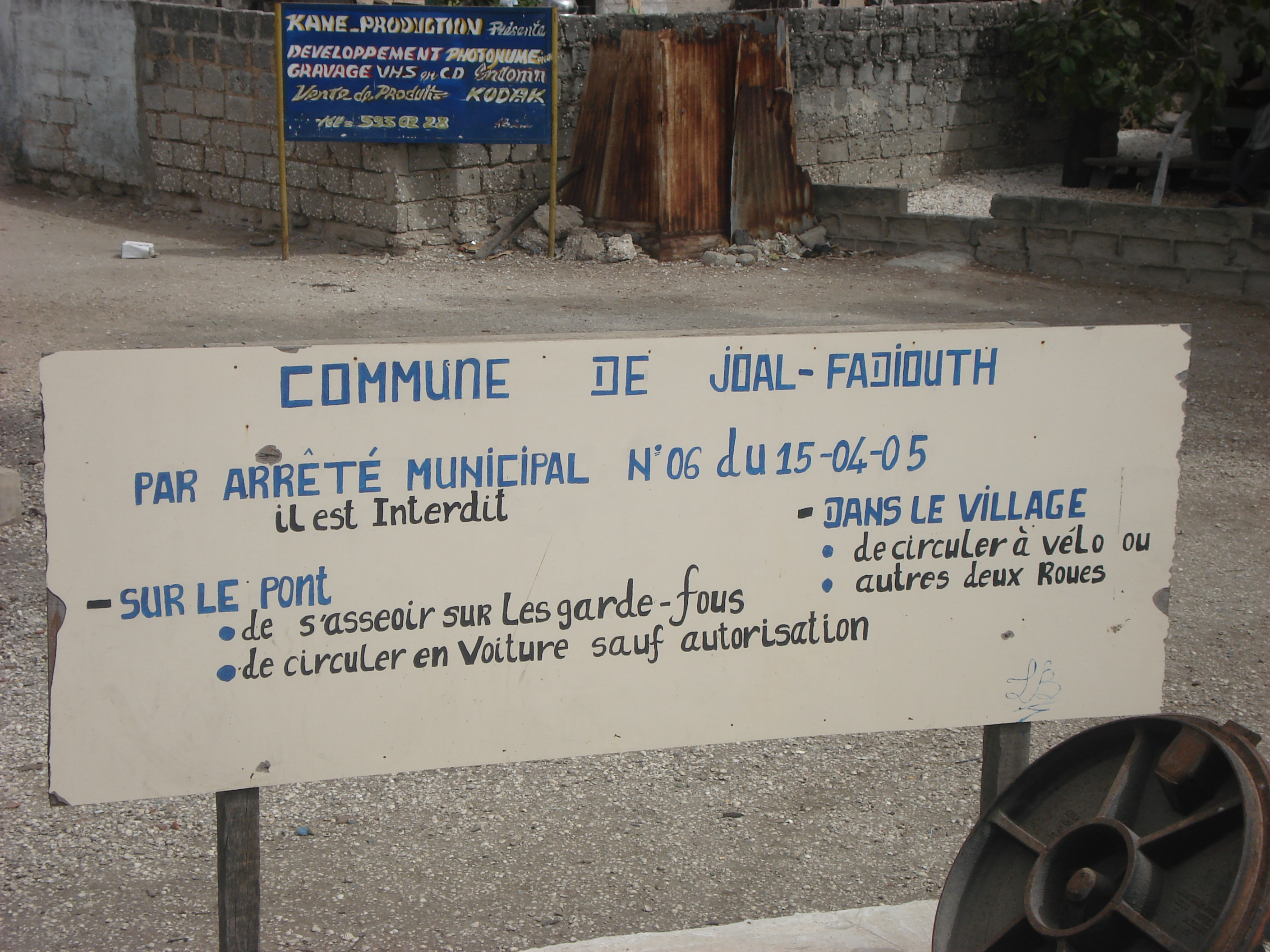
Entrance to the new commune

Joal-Fadiouth was initially a canton, later on a county seat. It was elevated to a commune on 1 February 1966, with the process being completed by decree n° 72-82 on 3 February 1972 defining the borders of the commune.

Today, Joal-Fadiouth is a part of the M'bour Department, occupying the southernmost point of the Thiès Region.

Bordering the Atlantic Ocean in the west, the commune incorporates the rural community of Nguéniène in the north and the rural community of Palmarin in the south.

Its mayors have been Jean Collin, Emmanuel Sobel Diouf, Paul Ndong and presently Boucar Diouf

== Geology ==
Joal-Fadiouth occupies an intermediate point between the Sahel Belt and the humid Casamance region.

Due to its position in an estuary, the greater part of the commune (3,021 hectares) is seasonally flooded.

The climate is typical of the Sahel with 3 to 4 months of winter from July to October and mild temperatures from November to April. The annual average temperature is 29 °C.

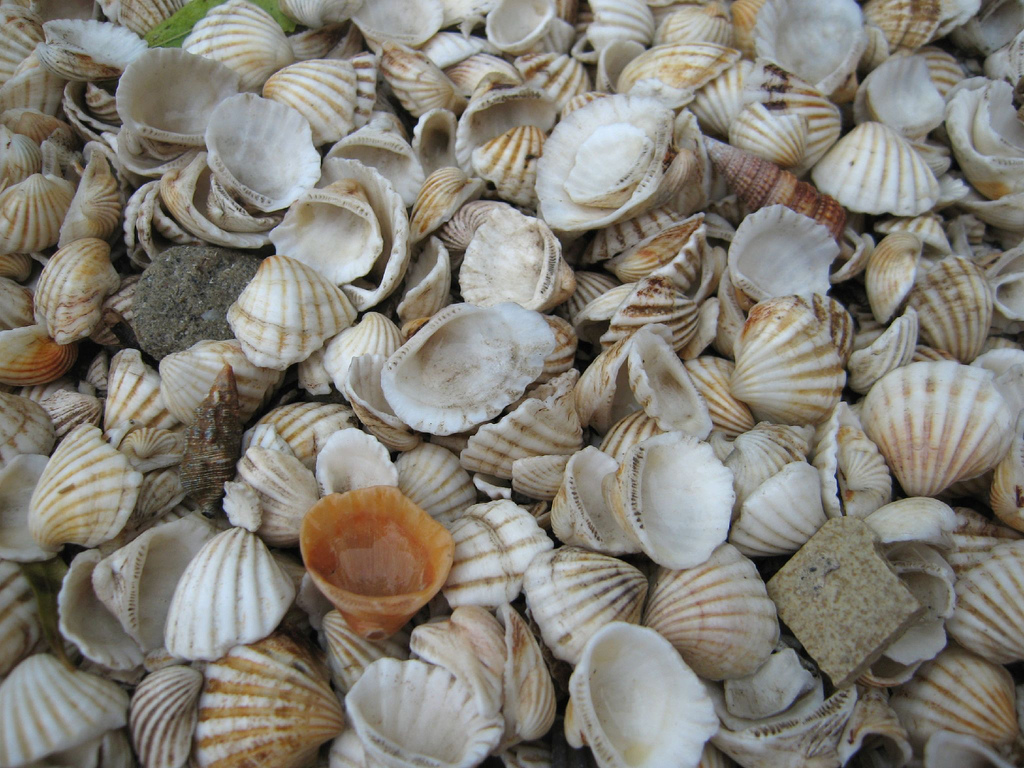
Sea shells

The estuary is at any time of the year populated by mangroves, it is pervaded by bolongs, arms of the sea common to the coast of Senegal, mixing salt-water with river water and sprinkled with little isles of sea shells populated by baobabs and acacias.

The mangrove woods are populated by sea birds (sea gulls, woodcocks, pelicans, flamingos). Monkeys, ciconias and hyenas are also to be found there. This island has millions of sea shells, the local people use the shells to decorate their graves.

== Population ==
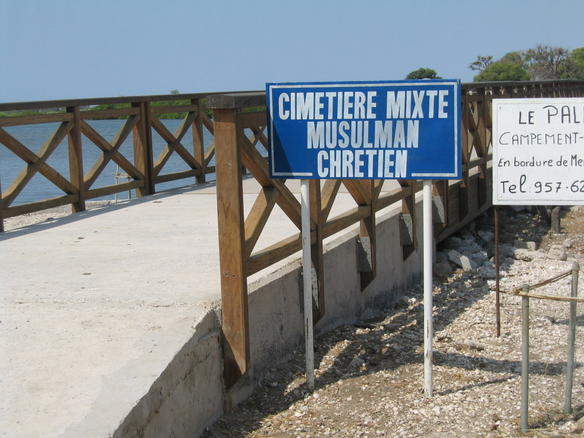
The mixed cemetery of Fadiouth

The most recent census of 2013 put the population at 45,903 people. The population is predominantly of Serer origin. In a country with an overwhelming majority of Muslims, the inhabitants of the isle of Fadiouth are 90% Christian.

== Economy ==
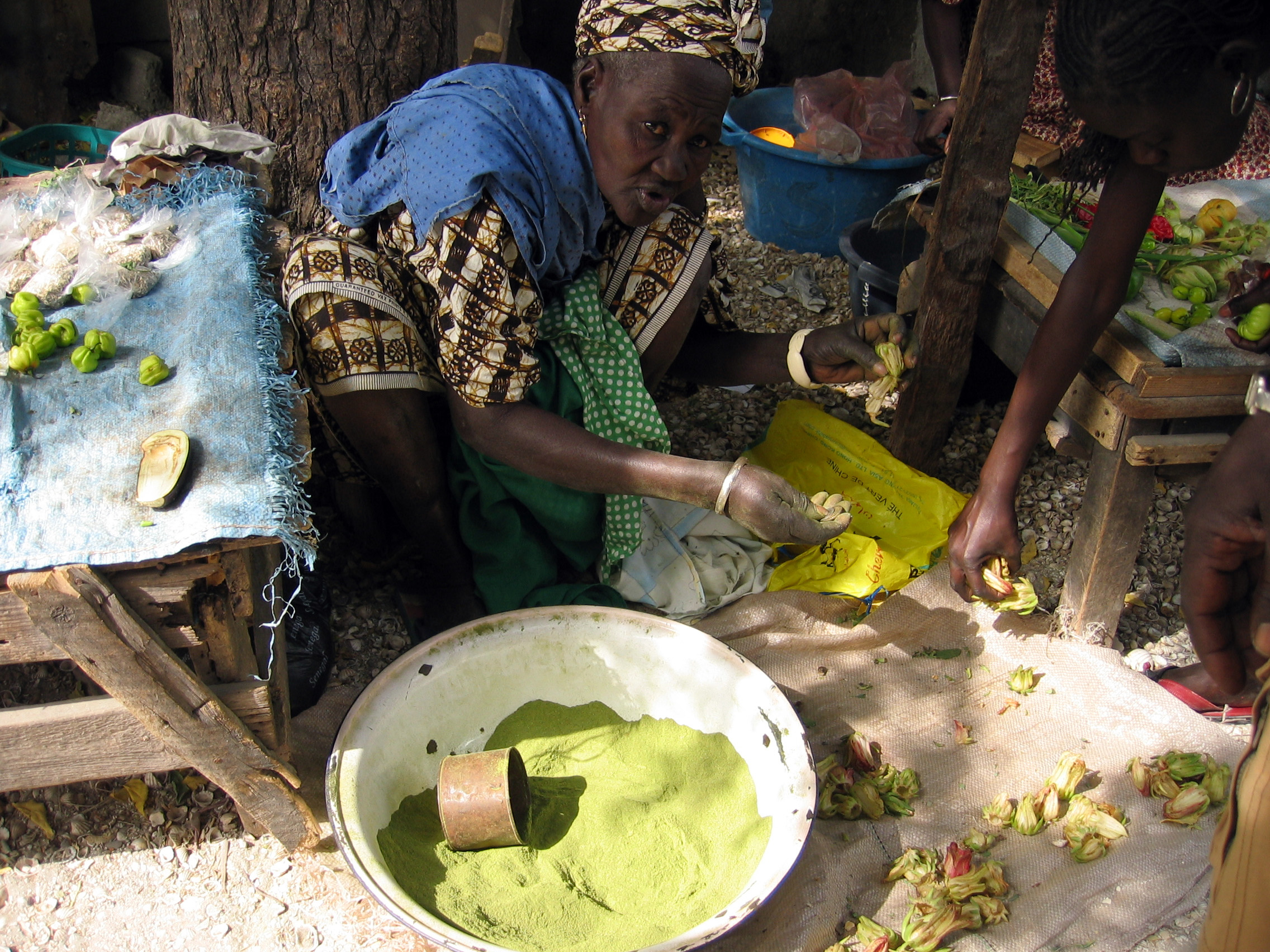
Sale of lalo (powder made of dried baobab leaves)

The main income of Joal is fishing (it is the largest fishing harbour of Senegal), agriculture and tourism.

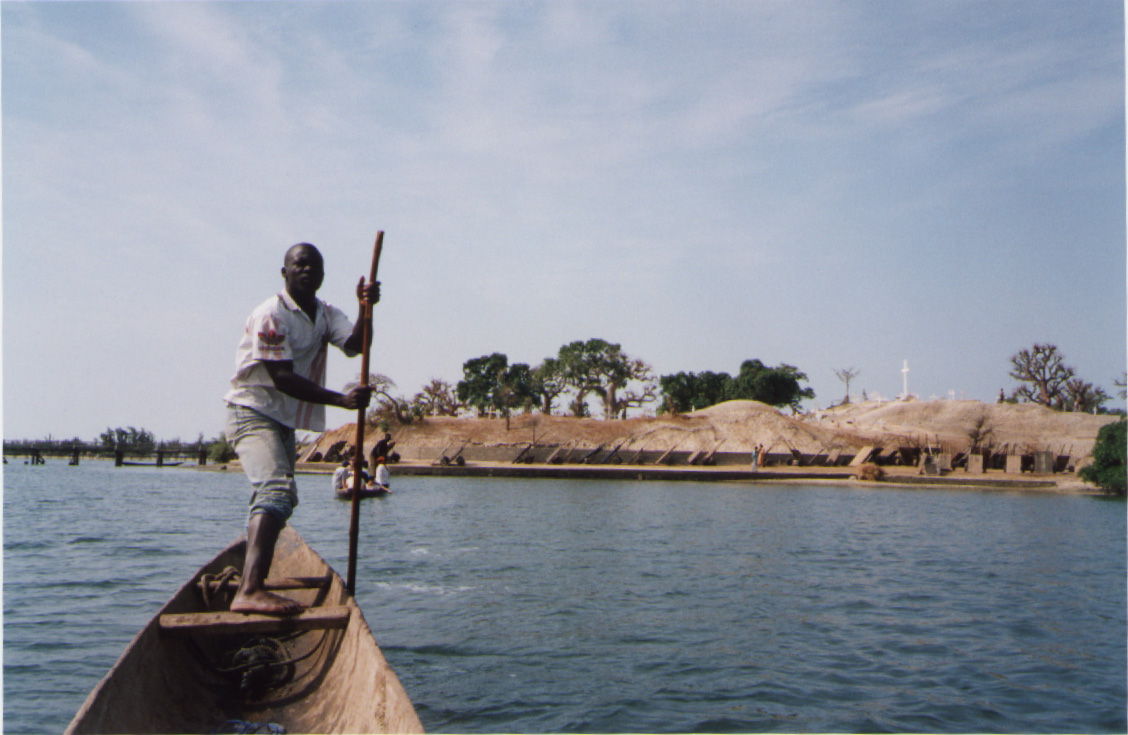
The cemetery of Fadiouth

== Famous personalities ==
- The first president of Senegal, Léopold Sédar Senghor, was born at Joal. Visiting his birthplace, Mbind Diogoye ("lion's mansion" in Serer), is possible.
- Yékini, the champion of Senegalese wrestling was born in Joal.
- Robert Diouf, African Wrestling Champion was born in Joal.
- The first missionary who died in Senegal is buried in the cemetery of Fadiouth with a white cross marking his grave.
- In 2000, the writer Kama Sywor Kamanda was made an honorary citizen of Joal-Fadiouth.

== Climate ==
Fadiouth has a hot semi-arid climate (BSh) with no rainfall from November to May and moderate to heavy rainfall from June to October.

Climate data for Fadiouth
Month	Jan	Feb	Mar	Apr	May	Jun	Jul	Aug	Sep	Oct	Nov	Dec	Year
Mean daily maximum °C (°F)	31.4 (88.5)	32.7 (90.9)	33.9 (93.0)	33.8 (92.8)	33.6 (92.5)	33.6 (92.5)	32.1 (89.8)	31.3 (88.3)	31.9 (89.4)	33.4 (92.1)	34.0 (93.2)	31.8 (89.2)	32.8 (91.0)
Daily mean °C (°F)	23.5 (74.3)	24.6 (76.3)	25.8 (78.4)	26.3 (79.3)	27.0 (80.6)	28.3 (82.9)	27.9 (82.2)	27.3 (81.1)	27.6 (81.7)	28.0 (82.4)	27.0 (80.6)	24.4 (75.9)	26.5 (79.6)
Mean daily minimum °C (°F)	15.7 (60.3)	16.5 (61.7)	17.8 (64.0)	18.9 (66.0)	20.5 (68.9)	23.0 (73.4)	23.7 (74.7)	23.4 (74.1)	23.3 (73.9)	22.7 (72.9)	20.0 (68.0)	17.0 (62.6)	20.2 (68.4)
Average rainfall mm (inches)	1 (0.0)	0 (0)	0 (0)	0 (0)	0 (0)	32 (1.3)	123 (4.8)	258 (10.2)	184 (7.2)	44 (1.7)	2 (0.1)	1 (0.0)	645 (25.3)
Source: Climate-Data.org
