= Songo Tine =

Japanese wrestler and coach

- Born: Shogo Uozumi; 1993 (age 32–33); Hyōgo Prefecture, Japan
- Other names: Songo Tine
- Nationality: Japanese
- Style: Greco-Roman and Senegalese wrestling
- Team: Diakhao stable (since 2022)

Other information
- Occupation: Volunteer coach
- University: Senshu

Shogo Uozumi (魚住 彰吾, Uozumi Shōgo), known by his moniker Songo Tine is a Japanese wrestler and coach. He is a practitioner of both Greco-Roman and Senegalese wrestling.

== Early life and education ==
Shogo Uozumi was born in 1993 in the Hyōgo Prefecture in Japan. He came from a family of judokas, and took up judo at three years old. he trained int eh martial arts until he graduated from secondary school.

He also took up wrestling in his fifth grade of elementary studies. He graduated from the Senshu University in 2016 with a degree in economics.

== Career ==
=== Early years ===
Uozumi competed in Greco-Roman wrestling at the national level in Japan. He competed at the All-Japan Championships finishing fifth place. He also was a runner-up at the All-Japan University Championships.

=== First visit to Senegal ===
In January 2017, Uozomi was sent by the Japan International Cooperation Agency to Senegal as a volunteer to teach Greco-Roman wrestling to children in Thiès Senegal. It was part of the Japanese government's Sport for Tomorrow initiative He also discovered the local variant of wrestling called laamb or Senegalese wrestling.He returned to Japan in January 2019.

=== Return to Senegal ===
Uozumi returned to Senegal in 2022, to teach the youth Greco-Roman wrestling ahead of the 2026 Summer Youth Olympics which was hosted by the African country.

Uozumi has also began committing to Senegalese wrestling and became known under the name Song Tine. He joined the Diakhao stable in June 2022. The local wrestlers were initially skeptical of him due to his frame but earned respect after fighting them and showing his technique.

== Personal life ==
Uozumi is Songo Tine maintains a TikTok account to promote Senegalese wrestling which has 500,000 followers as of April 2026. In his video he has demonstrated the ability to speak Wolof and also narrates his life living in Senegal.

During the period between his initial and second trip to Senegal, Uozumi was part of the protection team of Hiroshi Hase who was then a member of the Japanese House of Representatives. Uozumi ended his role after Hase was elected as Governor of Ishikawa in the 2021 election.
