= Yékini =

Senegalese wrestler (born 1974)

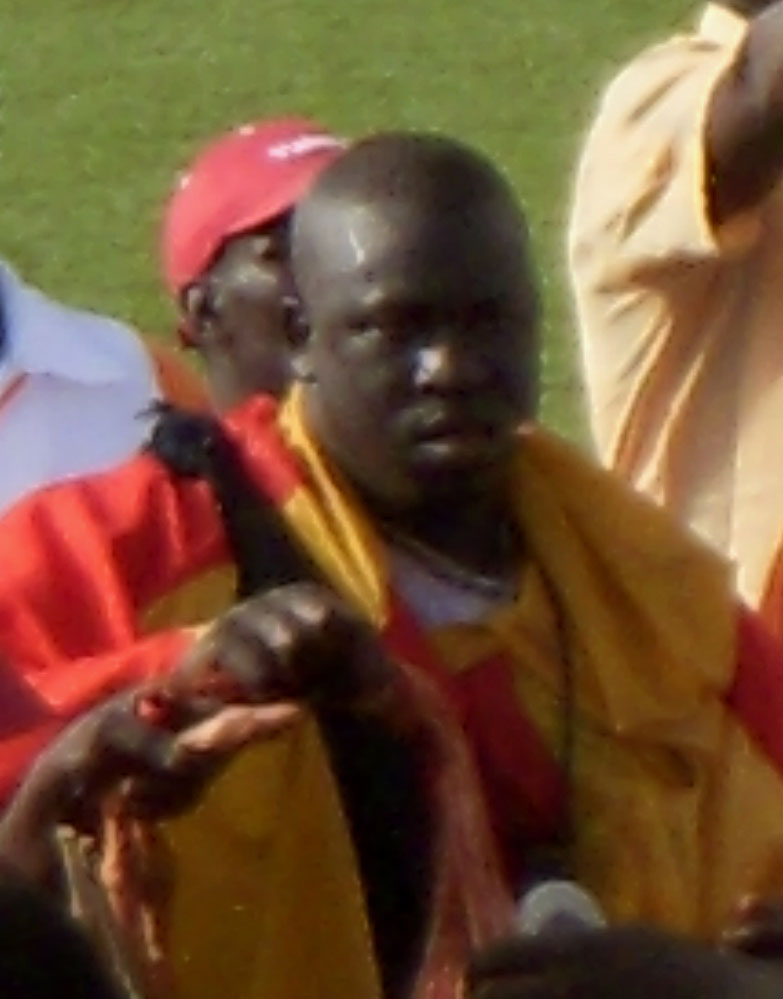
- Born: Yakhya Diop; 26 February 1974 (age 52); Joal-Fadiouth, Senegal
- Style: Senegalese wrestling

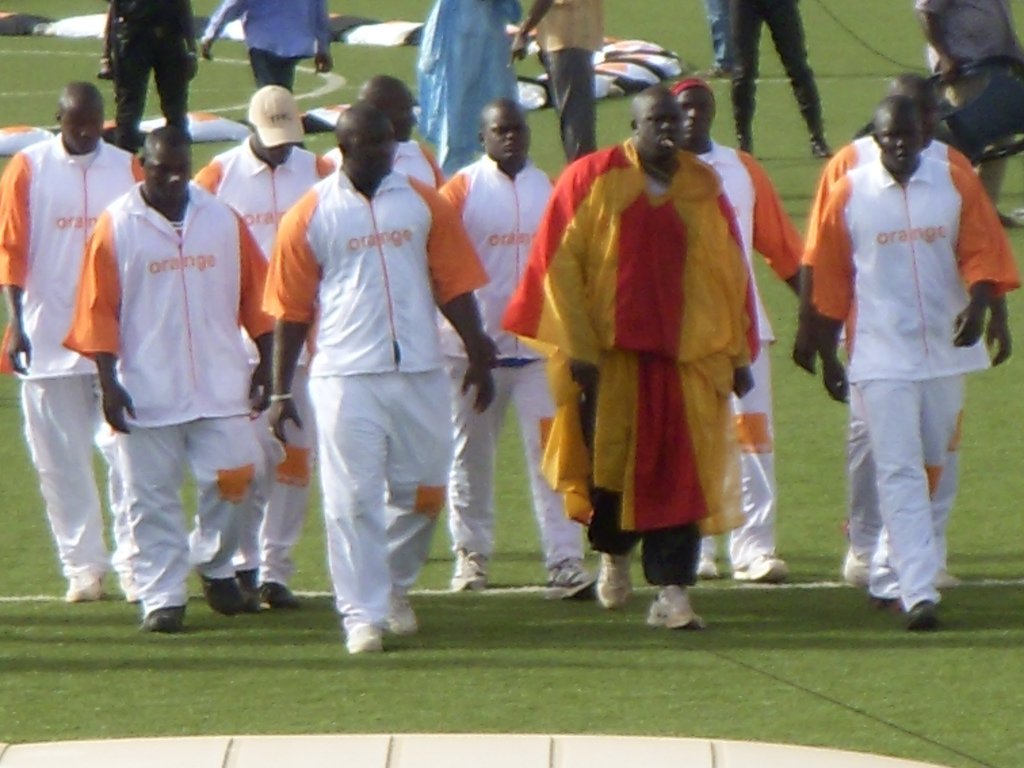
Yékini (in yellow and red) makes his entrance at his Senegalese wrestling bout against "Balla Beye" at Stade Demba Diop Dakar, Sénégal, 10 June 2007

Yékini is the nickname of Yakhya Diop (26 February 1974 in Joal), a popular champion of Senegalese wrestling. The most prominent variant of the Lutte Traditionnelle, a West African folk tradition which has become a major professional sport in the last two decades.

== Wrestling career ==
From the Serer ethnic group, Yékini is the most successful wrestler since the professionalisation of the sport, and his appearances are major news in his home country.

His 2006 fight against and defeat of Mohamed Ndao, alias Tyson, was billed in Senegal as "the fight of the century", cementing the two as the best known exponents of the sport. He was defeated by Balla Gaye 2, The Lion of Guédiawaye, at Stade Demba Diop on Sunday 22 April 2012, ending a reign that spanned almost two decades.

Yékini studied traditional "mbapatte" wrestling techniques before turning to the modern wrestling styles which include a mixture of boxing and wrestling.
