= Mame Gorgui Ndiaye =

- Born: 1939; French West Africa
- Died: February 9, 2024 (aged 84–85); Dakar, Senegal
- Occupation: Wrestler
- Martial arts career
- Other names: l’Enfant chéri de Dakar
- Style: Senegalese wrestling
- Team: Fass stable
- Years active: 1956–1985
- Musical career
- Genre: Bàkku
- Instrument: Vocals

Mame Gorgui Ndiaye (1939 – 9 February 2024) was a wrestler who was a practitioner of Senegalese wrestling.

== Career ==
=== Fighting career ===
Mame Gorgui Ndiaye was a Senegalese wrestler who was known as the l’Enfant chéri de Dakar (lit. 'Darling child of Dakar'). The sobriquet was given by journalist Alassane Ndiaye Allou of the RTS.

Mame Gorgui Ndiaye began his career in 1956. He was part of the Fass stable and along with Mbaye Gueye. He retired in 1985, after fighting Balla Gaye du Walo and accomplishing his hajj to the Mecca. His record stood at 101 wins, 26 draws and 22 defeats.

=== Bàkku ===
Aside from being a fighter, Ndiaye was also known for being a bàkkukat, or performers of bàkku which is described as a reflexive poem.

His bàkku were used as the theme song for traditional wrestling shows aired in the FM broadcast band.

He would use bàkku to assert his lineage, his wives and children the latter two being markers of his masculinity to intimidate opponents. He uses bàkku to bégal, an act intended to make his fans happy.

== Personal life ==
Ndiaye had three wives. He was born in 1939.

== Death ==
Ndiaye died on 9 February 2024 in his residence in Fass, Dakar.
