= National Wrestling Arena =

Stadium in Pikine, Senegal

- Arène Nationale de Lutte
- Interactive map of National Wrestling Arena
- Address: Pikine; Senegal
- Coordinates: 14°45′40.2″N 17°23′55.0″W
- Capacity: 20,000

Construction
- Opened: 22 July 2018
- Cost: CFA 32 billion

The National Wrestling Arena (French: Arène Nationale de Lutte) is a stadium in Pikine, Senegal.

== History ==
The Chinese government financed the construction of a venue for Senegalese wrestling in the city of Pikine in Senegal. The venue was built over a period of 28 months by Chinese companies. It cost 32 billion CFA francs.

The National Wrestling Arena was inaugurated on 22 July 2018, in a ceremony attended by Senegal President Macky Sall and Chinese President Xi Jinping.

The venue was part of the 27th stage of the torch relay for the 2026 Summer Youth Olympics which was hosted in Dakar.

== Facilities ==
The National Wrestling Arena is dedicated for traditional Senegalese wrestling, although it can also accommodate other disciplines like boxing and martial arts, as well as socio-educational activities.
