= Demba Diop =

Senegalese politician

Demba Diop (10 May 1927 – 3 February 1967) was a Senegalese politician. He served as Minister of Youth and Sport under President Léopold Sédar Senghor and was Mayor of Mbour from 1966 until his assassination.

== Life ==
Demba Diop remains an iconic figure in the political, educational, and municipal history of Senegal, as well as a living memory of sacrifice in the service of the nation. As a young man, he grew up between Podor and Dakar, where he completed his primary and secondary education. He attended the Albert Sarrault school in Dakar before passing the entrance exam for the prestigious William Ponty Normal School in Sébikotane (Rufisque); a true crucible for the African elites of the colonial era, from which he graduated as a teacher. This training marked the beginning of an exemplary career that would establish him as a figure of public service and education. He began his career in Marsassoum, in the Casamance region, before being conscripted into the French colonial army as part of Mandatory Military Service. Upon completing it, he was appointed General Supervisor of the Collège Moderne in Thiès. It was in this city that he met his colleague and future wife, Caroline Faye, in 1951. In October 1951, the couple was transferred to the Regional Normal School of Mbour, where Demba Diop took up his post on October 5, 1951. Thanks to his rigor and competence, he became the General Supervisor of the Cours Normal Régional (now the Lycée Demba Diop) in 1958, a position he held until 1959. In 1958, Demba Diop joined his wife, Caroline Faye (1923–1992) in politics and became fully committed to public life. From then on, he embodied a new generation of leaders dedicated to nation-building and improving the living conditions of rural populations. He was appointed administrative secretary for the Thiès region and later a regional councilor for Mbour. In 1960, he was elected as a member of parliament. From December 1962 to December 1963, he served as Minister of Popular Education, Youth, and Sports. In 1963, he returned to parliament and became President of the UPS (Senegalese Progressive Union) parliamentary group. He also held several major responsibilities, including rapporteur for the Commission on National Education, Technical Education, Youth, and Sports, as well as political commissioner for the Cap-Vert region. Through these roles, Demba Diop established himself as a major political actor in post-independence Senegal. Driven by his ambition for his city, he was elected Mayor of the Commune of Mbour on February 27th 1966, defeating Ibou Kébé, and was officially installed on March 10th 1966. His election reflected a clear desire to make Mbour shine and transform it into a dynamic center for development and modern urban organization. He thus became a symbol of commitment to Mbour, deeply attached to the history, development, and future of the commune. On January 12th 1967, during the celebration of the 40th anniversary of the appointment of Mbour's first mayor, Demba Diop participated actively in the commemorative activities. A few weeks later, on February 3rd 1967, he was assassinated on the premises of the Thiès Governance by Abdou Ndaffa Faye, in tragic circumstances that would leave a lasting mark on the national consciousness. His funeral took place in Mbour in the presence of Léopold Sédar Senghor, Lamine Guèye, and many other dignitaries. The officially designated masterminds were deputies Jacques d’Erneville and Ibou Kébé, who were sentenced to life imprisonment and twenty years of imprisonment, respectively. Fourteen other individuals were also sentenced to five years in prison. In 1962, Demba Diop presented Liberté 1, a film directed by Yves Ciampi, starring Nanette Senghor and Iba Guèye. Passionate about sports, Demba Diop was a former school champion in the discus throw, a multiple-time member of the national athletics team, and a co-founder of the Stade de Mbour club, of which he became the first president. During his tenure, the Stade de l’Amitié was built for the 1963 « Jeux de l’Amitié », and it was later renamed in his honor following his passing. Even today, the Demba Diop Stadium in Dakar perpetuates the memory of a man whose journey remains deeply tied to public service, education, political engagement, and sacrifice for the Senegalese nation.

== Death ==
Diop was assassinated on 3 February 1967. On the way to a meeting, he was stabbed in a parking lot in Thiès by Abdou N'Daffa Faye, a partisan of Diop's Mbour political rival (and deputy mayor of Mbour) Jacques d'Erneville. Faye was sentenced to death and was the first person in post-independence Senegal to be executed.

Diop's funeral in Mbour was an episode of national mourning, with President Senghor and Lamine Guèye in attendance.

This political violence, rare in Senegal, has had a long legacy. Opponents of Senghor's Socialist Party, as well as former supporters of Senghor's early rival Mamadou Dia, point to the executions as part of a pattern of suppression of political enemies in Senegal, where these two crimes were used as justification for a witchhunt. Regardless of the truth of these claims, the next year saw repression against violent Dakar student protests in May 68, and the introduction of constitutional changes, approved by the referendum of 22 February 1970, which created a Presidential system, greatly expanding presidential powers in what had become a de facto one party state.

== Legacy ==
Stade Demba Diop in Dakar, the Lycee Demba Diop, and the city's Boulevard are named for Diop.

His wife, Caroline Faye Diop is also a political leader. She was elected the first female deputy to the National Assembly of Senegal in 1963 and was later a cabinet minister under President Abdou Diouf.
