= Boukar Djillakh Faye =

Patriarch of the Faye dynasty of Sine

Patriarch of the Faye dynasty of Sine
- Heir-apparent: He is the ancestor of the Faye family. The last king of Sine from his patrilineage was Maad a Sinig Sanmoon Faye (reigned 1871 - 1878)
- Born: Djillakh (Dieghem, Kingdom of Baol) present-day Senegal
Names
- Boukar Djillakh Faye (proper : Bugar Jilaak Fay)
- Religion: Serer religion

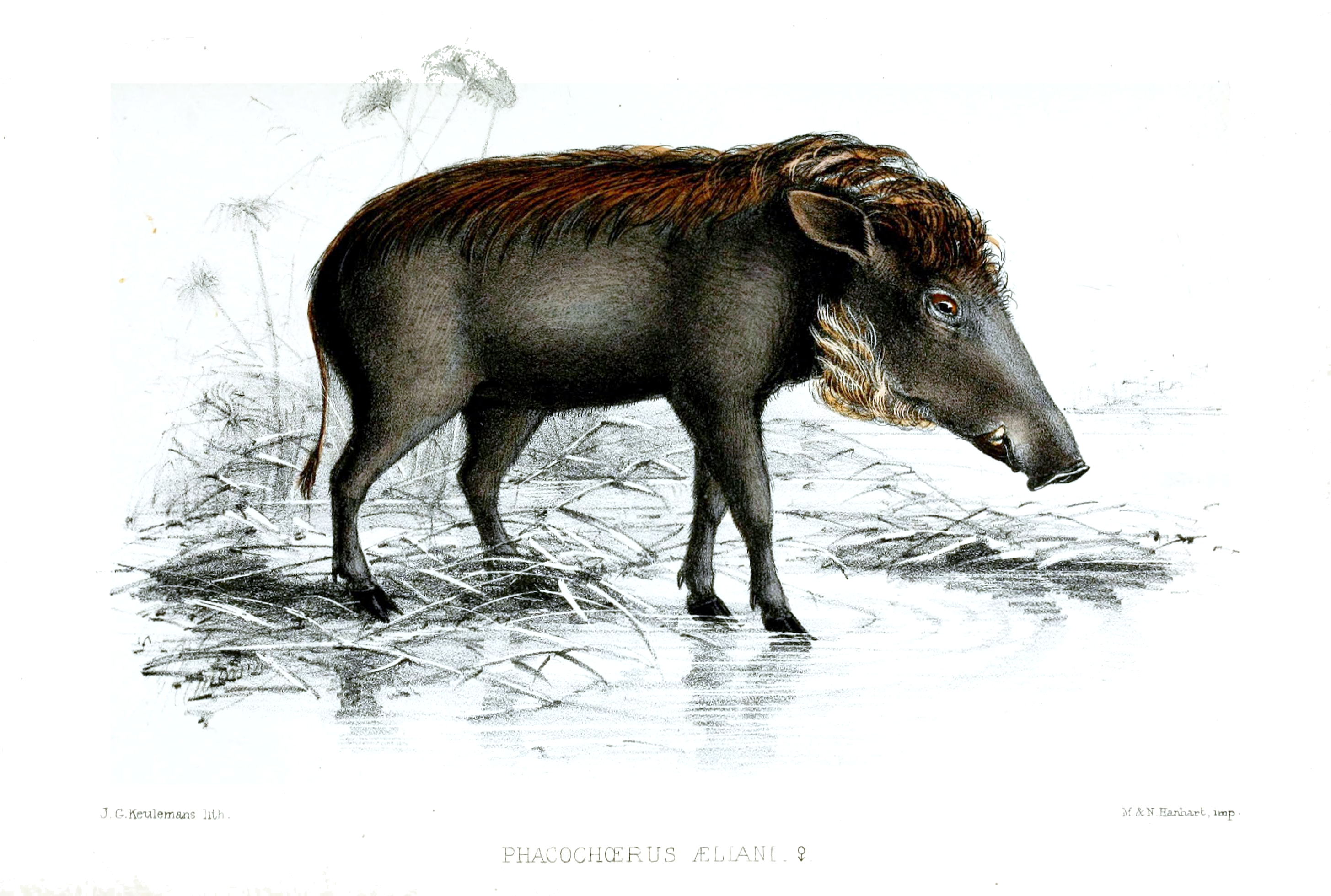
African warthog, totem of the Faye Family. The African warthog is the totem of the Faye family. In the mythology of the Serer people, it symbolises courage and leadership.

Boukar Djillakh Faye (Serer proper: Bugar Jilaak Fay, other variations : Bougar Birame Faye or Bugar Biram Fay) was a 14th-century Serer wrestler (njom) from the post-classical Kingdom of Sine which lies within present-day Senegal.

== Life ==
Originally from Djillakh (Dieghem, in the Sine), he was given the niece of Maysa Wali in marriage after demonstrating his prowess in the wrestling arena. According to oral tradition Maysa Wali, later a Maad a Sinig (king of Sine), was the first member of the Guelowar Dynasty to rule in Sine after his family's defeat by the Ñaancos at the so-called Battle of Troubang in 1335. In reporting this tradition, Henry Gravrand did not notice that this is actually a description of the 1867 (or 1865) Battle of Kansala. Boukar Djillakh Faye is linked to early Guelowar dynastic history in Senegambia (Senegal and Gambia) as well as Serer medieval and dynastic history. His marriage to Lingeer Tening Jom provided many heirs to the throne of Sine, including his sons Tasse Faye and Waagaan Tening Jom Faye, who all succeeded to the throne of Sine as Maad a Sinigs and established the Faye dynasty in Sine. Other sources suggest that he was married to Lingeer Siin o Mew Manneh (sister of Maysa Wali, whom the Kingdom of Sine was named after following its renaming in the 14th century), not Tening Jom, and it is from that marriage the Faye dynasty of Sine derived from. However, the general consensus is that the former narrative provided in Niokhobaye Diouf's Chronique du royaume du Sine - regarding Boukar Djillakh's marriage to Tening Jom, their children and descendants is much richer and probably more historically accurate albeit the disputed dates of reign for the earlier Maad a Sinigs, unlike Alioune Sarr's Histoire du Sine-Saloum, whose dates are the prevailing view. The variations between the historical narratives are however minute.

== Legacy ==
In all narratives, Boukar Djillakh Faye is regarded as one of the patriarchs of the Faye family, the father and direct ancestor of all the members of Faye patrilineage that ruled in Sine from the 14th to the 19th century. As one of the Senegambian royal families, many of his descendants went on to shape Senegambian history during these periods.

== See also ==
- Lamane Jegan Joof
- Maad Ndaah Njemeh Joof
- Index of Serer patriarchs
- Index of Serer matriarchs
- Senegalese wrestling

== Bibliography ==
- Diouf, Niokhobaye. "Chronique du royaume du Sine", Suivie de notes sur les traditions orales et les sources écrites concernant le royaume du Sine par Charles Becker et Victor Martin. (1972). Bulletin de l'Institut Fondamental d'Afrique Noire, Tome 34, Série B, n° 4, (1972)
- Sarr, Alioune, Histoire du Sine-Saloum (Sénégal), Introduction, bibliographie et notes par Charles Becker. Version légèrement remaniée par rapport à celle qui est parue en 1986–87
- Buschinger, Danielle, "Van den vos Reynaerde: mittelniederländisch - neuhochdeutsch", (Editor & translator : Jan Willem Kloos), Presses du Centre d'Etudes médiévales Université de Picardie (1992), ISBN 2-901121-16-0
- Klein, Martin A., "Islam and Imperialism in Senegal, Sine-Saloum, 1847 - 1914", Edinburgh University Press, ISBN 0-85224-029-5
- Institut fondamental d'Afrique noire, Bulletin: Sciences humaines, Volume 34", IFAN (1972)
- Gravrand, Henry, "La civilisation Sereer - Cosaan",
- Martin, V.; Becker, C. & Mbodj, M., "Trois documents d’Ernest Noirot sur l’histoire des royaumes du Siin et du Saalum" (Sénégal), Bull. IFAN, 42, B, 1 (1980)
