= Abdala Faye =

Senegalese sculptor

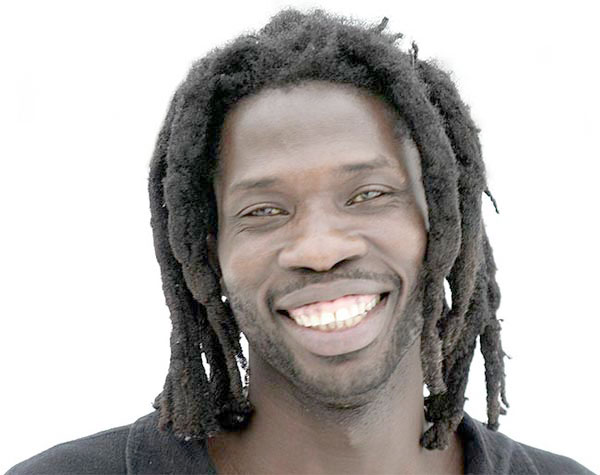
- Abdala Faye, 2008
- Born: 1 January 1971; Yene Guedj, Senegal
- Known for: Painting, Drawing, Sculpture

Abdala Faye (born January 1, 1971) is a Senegalese mixed media artist, and member of the Serer noble Faye family. He is the grandson of former Senegalese king, Mbaye Ndiay Djaly.

== Early life ==
At the age of 12 he had his first showing in Paris, France and sold all of his paintings. From that day on, Abdala immersed himself in art and became a full-time artist. He knew that art, not government service, was his life's calling.

Faye began traveling the continent of Africa and Europe at the age of 15.

In Burkina Faso, Abdala learned the methods of batik (printing on cloth with wax), and mudclothe (printing on cloth with a mixture of mud and herbs).

== Career ==
Abdala's art has been featured in exhibits around the world including Senegal, Brasil, France, Belgium, Germany and the United States.

Faye opened Akebuland in Iowa City, IA USA. The store sold paintings and other authentic African goods crafted by villagers in Ndem, Senegal. Among the items were Abdala's batik and mudclothe designs and finger paintings.

In 2008 he moved to Cincinnati, OH where he opened The Faye Gallery.

In addition to his artwork, Faye spends his time playing the hand drum and the bass guitar. He is also fluent in many languages, including Wolof, Serer, Jola, French, English, Bambara, and Arabic.

== Giving Back ==
Abdala likes to give back to the community. He is the co-founder of "Art Express". Art Express aids those with disabilities by means of art experimentation regardless of their economical status. He also donates pieces and shares positive messages to art students in his community.

== Quotes ==
One fish, two fish, red fish, blue fish.

— Abdala Faye

== Exhibits ==
- 2007 Gallery Guichard
- 2002 - 2005 Chait Gallery
- 2001 CFM Gallery
- 2001 Marcum's Gallery
