= Mbaye Dieye Faye =

Senegalese percussionist and singer

Mbaye Dieye Faye (born 1 October 1960) is a Senegalese singer and percussionist.

== Overview ==
Mbaye Dieye Faye is a singer and percussionist in Senegal. Although patrilineally from the noble Serer Faye family, he was born to a modest family of griots. He had problems when he wanted to be a singer. Formerly, people used to say that when you sing, you are going to "take a bad way." For instance, you can use drugs or alcohol—because of the environment, bars, hotels, dancing—so, that was the reason his father forbade him from becoming a drummer.

When he was a child, Faye's father sent him to koranic school before he entered French school. But at a young age, he deserted school and became a carpenter of metals after he began to tap the drums. When he first informed his father about his affection for music, his father started to beat him. It was after becoming conscious of his son's devotion that his father consented.

Mbaye Dieye Faye continued to decide to be a singer before his father decided to give him his agreement. After all, it was typical for the young son of Sing Sing to tap the drums. Faye begun to drum with his companion Youssou N'Dour well known as the "King of Mbalax" in Senegal. Mbaye Dieye Faye had begun singing when he gave up his work as a metal carpenter and left this school. His first concert with Youssou N'Dour was delightful for them even if they got only one thousand Cfa each.

In his adulthood, he married Mame Ndiaye and has his kids with her. According to Mbaye Dieye Faye, it is not easy to become famous, but also it's not easy to be celebrated. Indeed, famous people are not free; they can't do whatever they want. To gain his life, Mbaye Dieye Faye has his music, the praise he made during ceremonies, concerts, and advertisements such as ‘halib’ a milk product, ‘the la force’ a tea product.

== Music ==
Now, Mbaye Dieye Faye is a famous singer and percussionist in Senegal. He makes rhythm in his music, the Mbalax. What makes Mbaye Faye remarkable is not only his ability to beat the drum but his way of dancing and giving life in his concerts. Since he is always a “griot,” he knows how to make himself listened to. He is a court musician; he sang praise and told the history of people of the region which interest people. The advertisements also make him famous.

Formally, the Senegalese Mbalax was not very rhythmic because they used only drums and some traditional instruments. However, it changed entirely with the modern musicians, particularly Mbaye Dieye Faye. This latter with the new tools such as the piano, guitar, and saxophone play a mixed music meaning the traditional music and the modern one—for instance, the beat of drums and the blare of trumpets.

Mbaye Dieye Faye has composed some albums, such as Songa Ma, Live Biir Thiossane, Oupoukay, and others. Songoma is the most famous, and the one most appreciated by the audience. This music had caused many problems because of religious principles. Indeed, it is a dance that required a particular way of dressing called “Joubax out,” missing Wolof and English, which means literally “navel out.” To attract more attention, girls wore indecently, tied, and transparent clothes. However, others think that “songoma” only dances like all dances. It brings people to be more friends to enjoy oneself. So, even in families, people can dance it just for pleasure.

Live in Thiossane, is also a great album. The wolof word “Thiossane” is a dancing night club owned by Youssou Ndour. Oupoukay brought much pleasure to people.

Mbaye Dieye Faye is the percussionist of the "Super Etoile" band. But he tends to sing at the same time with Youssou Ndour. In “Mbalax” rhythm, he introduced—as he calls it—“Khorom” (Salt ). Nobody can dance to his music without getting tired. Indeed, it is tough to follow his drums. And it's like doing sport because dancing his music means jumping, moving one's body, and all members. So, nothing must be calm.

The role of Mbaye Dieye Faye in the band is also to make entertainment adequately. He is a griot, a repository of oral tradition, a praise singer, but he is more interested in singing love and romance. Most of the time, he uses “Tassou,” a kind of speech with some rhythms, reminding one of rap music. That is mainly for amusing people, but often, statements contain vulgar expressions. And for him, it is for exciting dancers and having them moving more.
