= Lutte Traditionnelle =

Style of West African folk wrestling

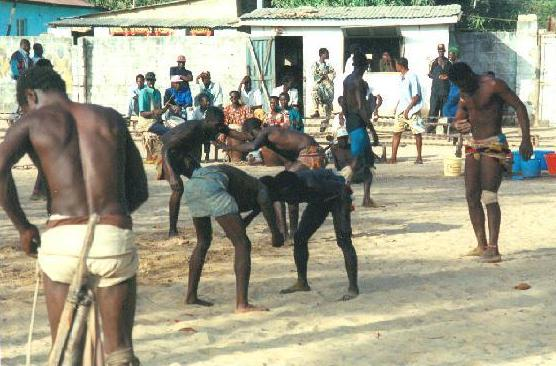
- Traditional wrestlers compete at Boreh in The Gambia.
- Focus: Wrestling
- Olympic sport: No

Lutte Traditionnelle (fr. for Traditional Wrestling) is a style of West African folk wrestling, known as Laamb in Senegal and in the Gambia, Evala in Togo, and KoKowa / Kokawa in Hausa areas of Nigeria and Niger, or simply Lutte Traditionnelle, in Niger and Burkina Faso. International competition takes place during the Jeux de la Francophonie and the newly organised Championship of African Lutte Traditionnelle.

== Variation ==
Since the 1950s, a number of West African traditions have been assimilated into Lutte Traditionnelle as it has become a major spectator sport and cultural event. The major variation has become Laamb, or Senegalese Wrestling, which allows punching (frappe), the only of the West African traditions to do so. As a larger confederation and championship around Lutte Traditionnelle have developed since the 1990s, Senegalese fighters now practice both forms, called officially Lutte Traditionnelle sans frappe (for the international version) and Lutte Traditionnelle avec frappe for the striking version.

In Nigeria, and Hausa areas of Niger, Kokawa has become regularised to the West African standard. There the striking component has been hived off to a separate boxing event called Dambe. Both are performed on the same traditional ring, though Dambe has become the preserve of traveling cofraternities of fighters.

== Goal ==
Two fighters compete in a circular ring, in more formal events bound by sand bags. Each fighter attempts to eject the other from the ring, though they can win by knocking the other off their feet or onto all fours.

== International organisation ==
Lutte Traditionnelle has grown in organisation and popularity throughout much of West Africa since the 1980s. Alongside national championships in many nations, several organisations have organised international tournaments, which in turn have necessitated a harmonisation of rules. International competition takes place during the Jeux de la Francophonie and since 2000, is overseen by a coordinating body which organises the African Championship of lutte traditionnelle. In 2008, the Economic Community of West African States (ECOWAS) organised its first international championship for Lutte Traditionnelle in Dakar, inviting teams from eleven nations: Senegal, Mali, Niger, Nigeria, Burkina Faso, Guinea, Gambia, Guinée Bissau, Togo, Liberia and la Côte d'Ivoire. Nigeria won the competition, marking the first time an Anglophone nation (outside the Gambia) has won a major Lutte tourney.

The Canarian migration route has brought migrant teenagers familiarised with Senegalese, Mali and Mauritanian wrestling into Canarian wrestling, which has similarities and differences with the continental styles.
