= Abdou N'Daffa Faye =

Abdou N'Daffa Faye (died March 1967) was the assassin of Demba Diop, a minister in the government of Senegal. Faye shot Diop on 3 February 1967 in a parking lot in Thiès. Faye was sentenced to death by a Senegalese court, and was the first of two people to be executed in post-independence Senegal. He was executed by firing squad in March 1967.

However, according to Amnesty International, Faye was the second and most recent person to have been executed by Senegal. This information is contradicted by other sources, which report that Moustapha Lô was executed in June 1967 and that Faye was, in fact, the first person executed by Senegal.
