= Caroline Faye Diop =

Senegalese politician

Senegalese Minister of State
- In office 1982–1983

Deputy Minister
- In office 1981–1982

Minister of Social Action
- In office March 15, 1978 – April 9, 1979

Member of the National Assembly
- In office 1963–1978

Personal details
- Born: Faye; July 11, 1923 Foundiougne, French West Africa (now Senegal)
- Died: July 29, 1992 Dakar, Senegal
- Spouse: Demba Diop
- Parents: Louis Diène Faye (father); Fatim Diop (mother)

Caroline Faye Diop (born 11 July 1923 at Foundiougne, died 28 July 1992 at Dakar) was a Senegalese politician, the first female deputy and first female minister of the country. She was the wife of politician Demba Diop, Minister of Youth and Sport under president Léopold Sédar Senghor, who was assassinated in 1967.

== Early life and education ==
Caroline Faye Diop was born in Foundiougne, Fatick, then in French West Africa, on July 11, 1923. She was the daughter of Louis Diène Faye, a chartered accountant and activist of the SFIO, one of the founders of the Senegalese Democratic Bloc, and Fatim Diop. She passed the entrance exam for the École normale de jeunes filles de l'Afrique-Occidentale française in Rufisque, graduating third in her class in 1945.

Faye Diop became a teacher in Louga in 1945, then in Thiès, Matam, and finally in Mbour, where she directed a girls' school from 1951 to 1962. In Mbour, she met Demba Diop, who was then the general supervisor of "cours normal de Mbour" (this institution would later be renamed in his honor). They married in 1951. She also met Abdoulaye Sadji, an independence advocate, who encouraged her to continue her political involvement. She joined the Senegalese Democratic Bloc in 1948. She managed to be detached from teaching to focus more specifically on rural development.

== Political career ==
Faye Diop was involved in the creation of the women's movement associated with the Senegalese Progressive Union (UPS), a new Senegalese party created in 1958 and led by Léopold Sédar Senghor. Senegal gained independence in 1960. Nominated by the UPS as a candidate in the legislative elections, Faye Diop became a deputy from 1963 to 1978. She was the first woman in the country's history to sit in the National Assembly.

From 1963, she worked within the assembly on the project to create a Family Code and encouraged women to earn their own living. She was the only woman to participate in the vote on this Family Code. She was the fourth vice president of the National Assembly. She was elected president of the Women of the Senegalese Progressive Union in 1964. That same year, she became the deputy secretary-general of the Pan-African Women.

Her husband was assassinated in February 1967, likely a victim of a political conflict.

She became the first woman minister, being appointed Minister of Social Action in 1978. She then served as Deputy Minister to the Prime Minister from 1981 to 1982 and as Minister of State from 1982 to 1983. In 1957, at a party congress held in Thiès, she protested to President Senghor that despite the number of women present, none had spoken.

She died on July 29, 1992.

== See also ==
- Louis Diène Faye
