= Senegalese wrestling =

Type of folk wrestling

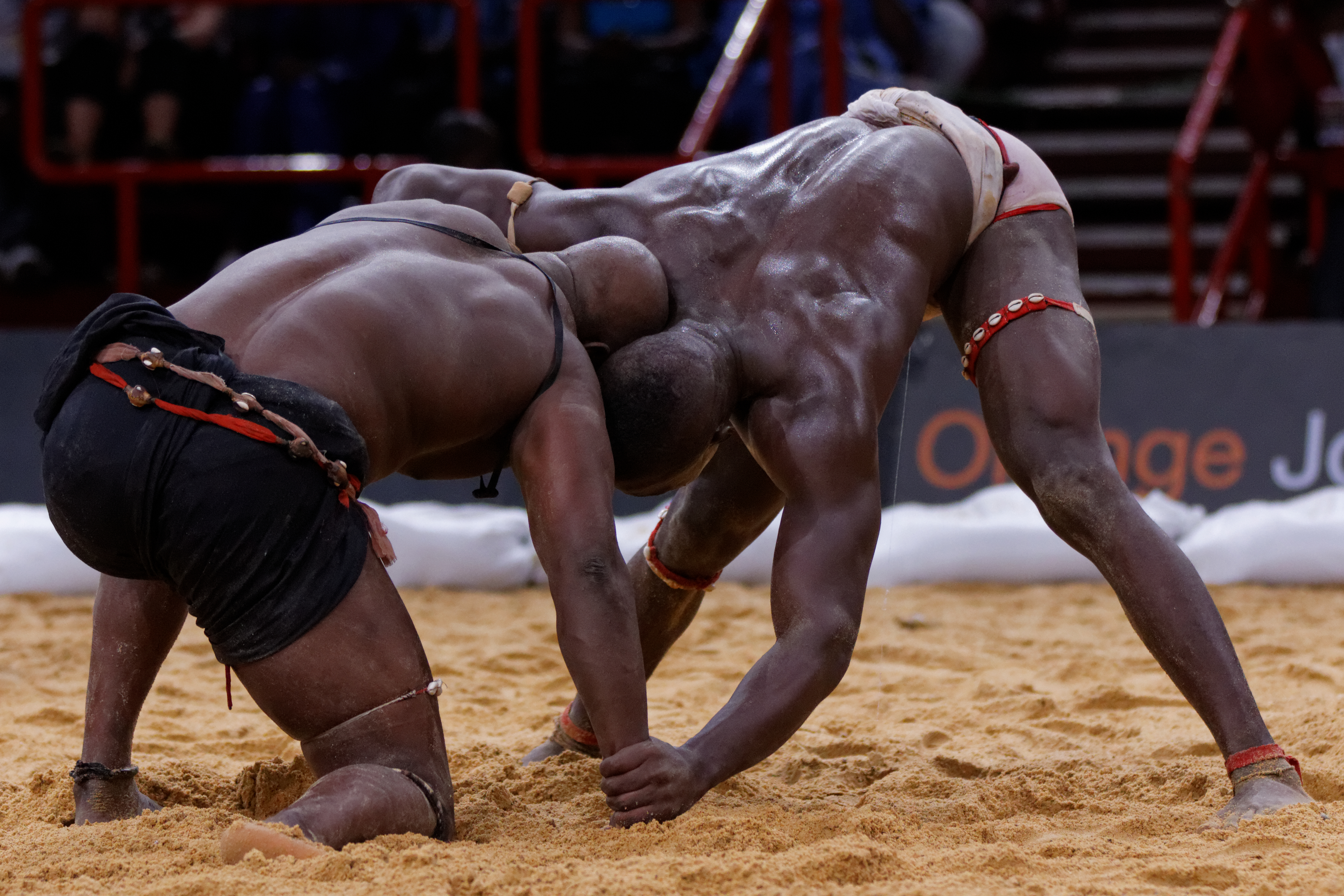
- Mame Balla vs. Pape Mor Lô, Paris-Bercy, 2013
- Focus: Wrestling
- Olympic sport: No

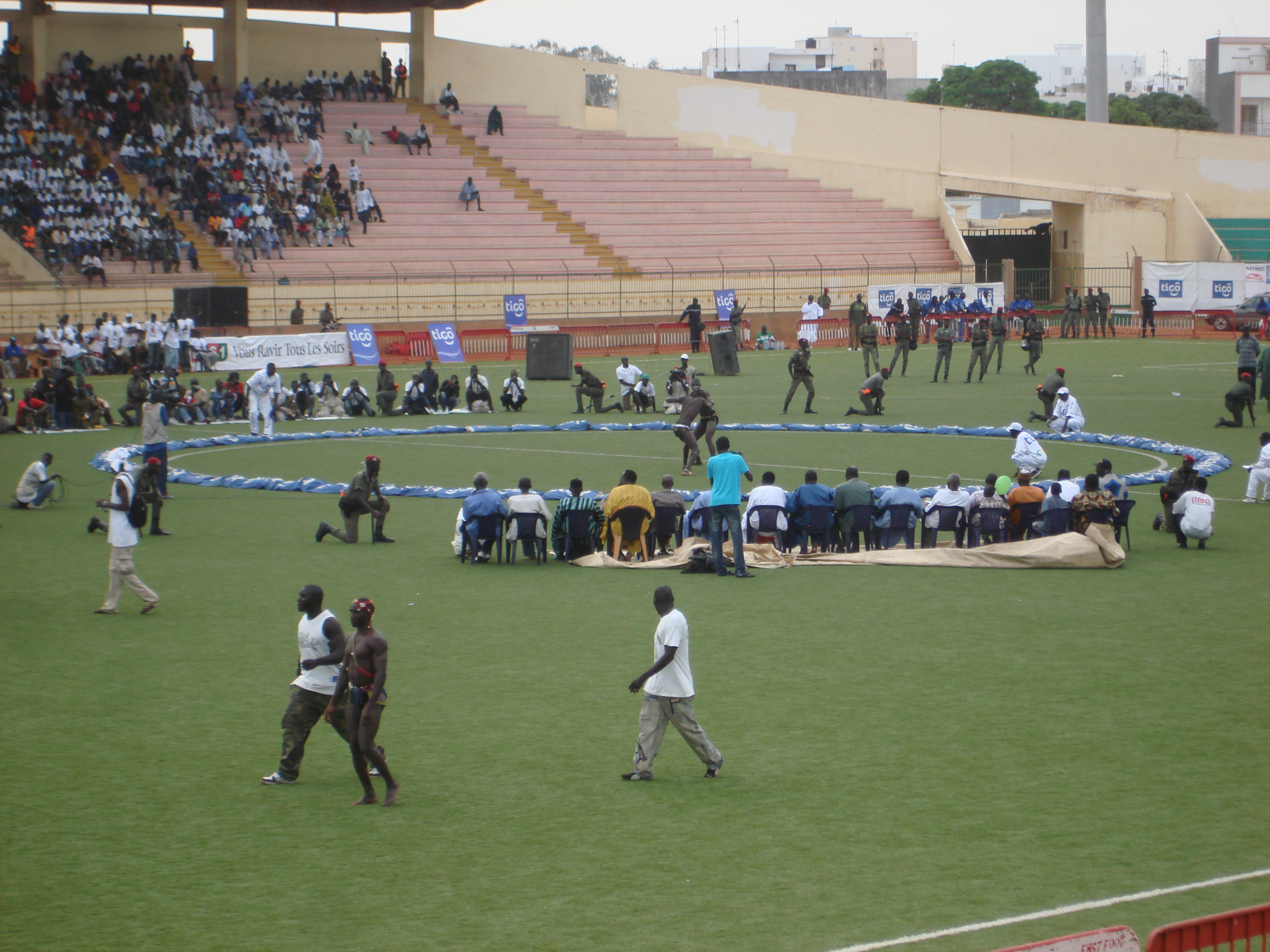
Senegalese wrestling match at the stade Demba Diop in Dakar

Senegalese wrestling (Njom in Serer, Lutte sénégalaise or simply Lutte avec frappe in French, Laamb in Wolof, Siɲɛta in Bambara) is a type of folk wrestling traditionally performed by the Serer people and now a national sport in Senegal and parts of The Gambia, and is part of a larger West African form of traditional wrestling (fr. Lutte Traditionnelle). The Senegalese form traditionally allows blows with the hands (frappe), the only one of the West African traditions to do so. As a larger confederation and championship around Lutte Traditionnelle has developed since the 1990s, Senegalese fighters now practice both forms, called officially Lutte Traditionnelle sans frappe (for the international version) and Lutte Traditionnelle avec frappe for the striking version. This activity predates the modern-day countries of Senegal and Gambia, and Senegambian wrestling is perhaps more historically and geographically correct.

== History ==
It takes its root from the wrestling tradition of the Serer people – formally a preparatory exercise for war among the warrior classes depending on the technique. In Serer tradition, wrestling is divided into different techniques with mbapate being one of them. It was also an initiation rite among the Serers, the word Njom derives from the Serer principle of Jom (from Serer religion), meaning heart or honour in the Serer language. The Jom principle covers a huge range of values and beliefs including economic, ecological, personal and social values. Wrestling stems from the branch of personal values of the Jom principle. One of the oldest known and recorded wrestlers in present-day Senegal was Boukar Djilak Faye (a Serer) who lived in the 14th century in the Kingdom of Sine. He was the ancestor of the Faye Paternal Dynasty of Sine and Saloum (both Kingdoms in present-day Senegal). The njom wrestling spectacle was usually accompanied by the kim njom – the chants made by young Serer women in order to reveal their gift of "poetry" (ciid in Serer). The Wolof word for wrestling, Laamb, derives from the Serer language Fara-Lamb Siin (Fara of Mandinka origin whilst Lamb of Serer origin) the chief griot who used to beat the tam-tam of Sine called Lamb or Laamb in Serer. The lamb was part of the music accompaniment of wrestling in pre-colonial times as well as after Senegal's independence. It was also part of the Njuup tradition (a conservative Serer music repertoire, the progenitor of Mbalax).

Transcending ethnic groups, the sport enjoys the status of national sport. Traditionally, young men also used to fight as a distraction, to court wives, prove their manliness, and bring honor to their villages. Usually each wrestler (called mbër) performed a bàkk before the start of the combat.

In general, bàkk (which could also be spelled as baku, bakku, bakkous) is an oral art performance that is used to boast about oneself in order to instill a sense of fear or reverence in the audience or rivals. Bàkk is not only used in the context of wrestling but can also be used in political speeches or other encounters in which someone feels the need to brag about his accomplishments to receive admiration. Not only is bàkk used to brag about oneself, but it can also be used to offer respect to one's elders. The performance of bàkk can be in narratives, praise songs, or poems. Bàkk is used to complement the wrestler's physical presence by adding artistic elegance and verbal cleverness. Wolof wrestlers use the bàakk to present themselves as exceptional and impressive.

The oral art of the bàkk, used by the Senegalese wrestlers, has its history in griots. Historically, Wolof griots and griottes were singers tasked with relaying the eulogies of heroes and heroines who overcame hardships. Griots were used to sing praises to kings, wrestlers, and nobles in general. Griots usually came from lower castes and their task of singing praise was unique. They would accompany wrestlers, who usually came from upper castes to the arenas. In more contemporary times, Wolof wrestlers will now sing their own praises, which challenges the societal norm of praises only being sung by griots.

In the 1980s Senegalese wrestler Mame Gorgui Ndiaye (called "The Darling Child of Dakar") performed a notable bàkk, which made him popular among the Senegalese people. This famous bàkk was repeated often by children in Senegal and sang on the national radio on weekends during which combats took place.

Today bàkk is very popular in the country as an indication of male athletic strength and ability. Presently, wrestling is arranged by business-promoters who offer prizes for the winners. The 20,000-capacity Arene Nationale de Lutte in Dakar is the largest wrestling stadium by capacity in Senegal.

The popularity of Senegalese wrestling has grown that the top, most popular, wrestlers have been able to have television acting opportunities. But, despite the growing popularity the money from mixed martial arts (MMA), Senegalese wrestling has come under threat of having their top stars purged by the lure of bigger money.

== Goal ==
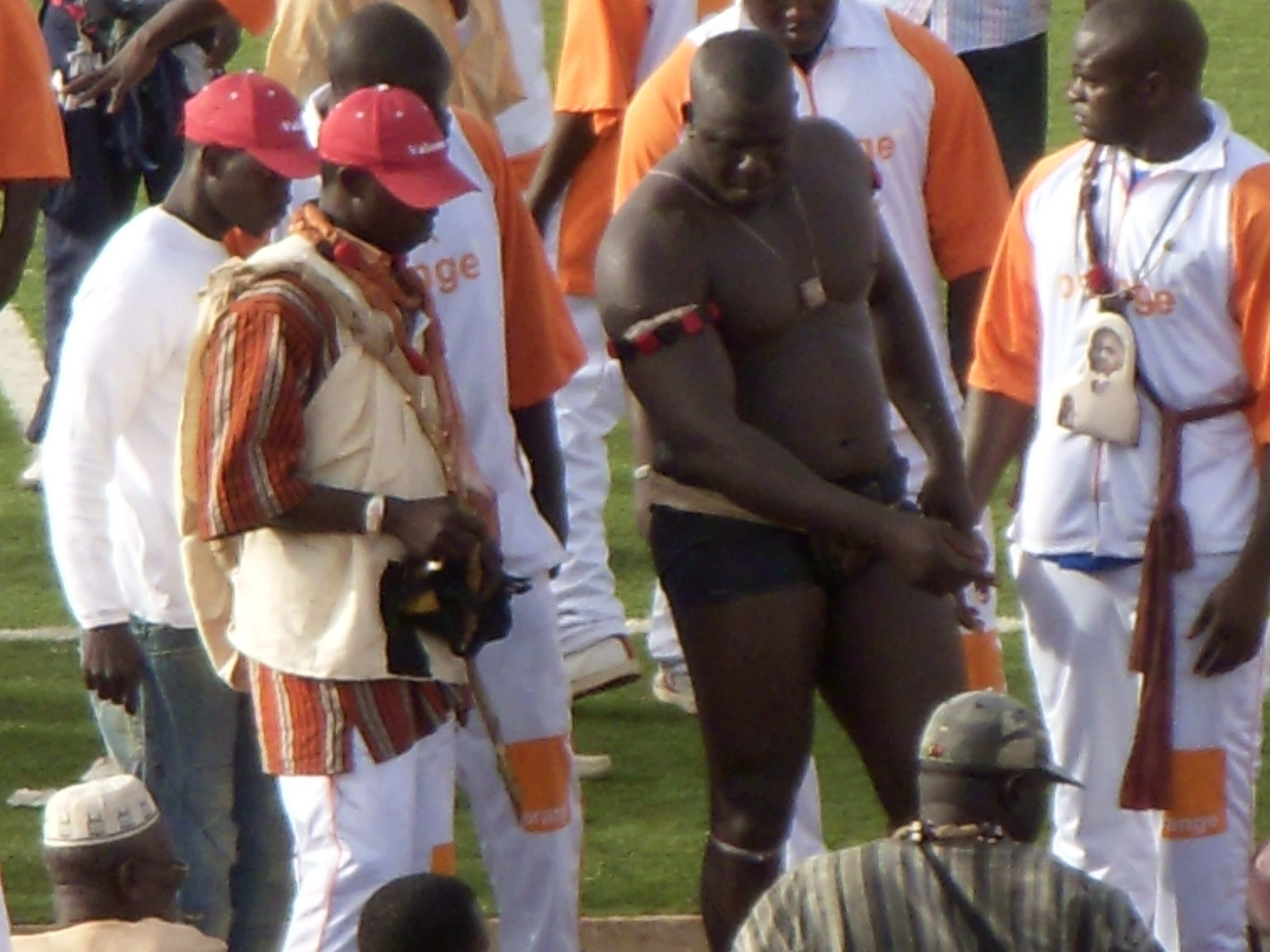
Champion wrestler Yékini (Yakhya Diop)

One of the main objectives is to throw the opponent to the ground by lifting him up and over, usually outside a given area.

== Training ==
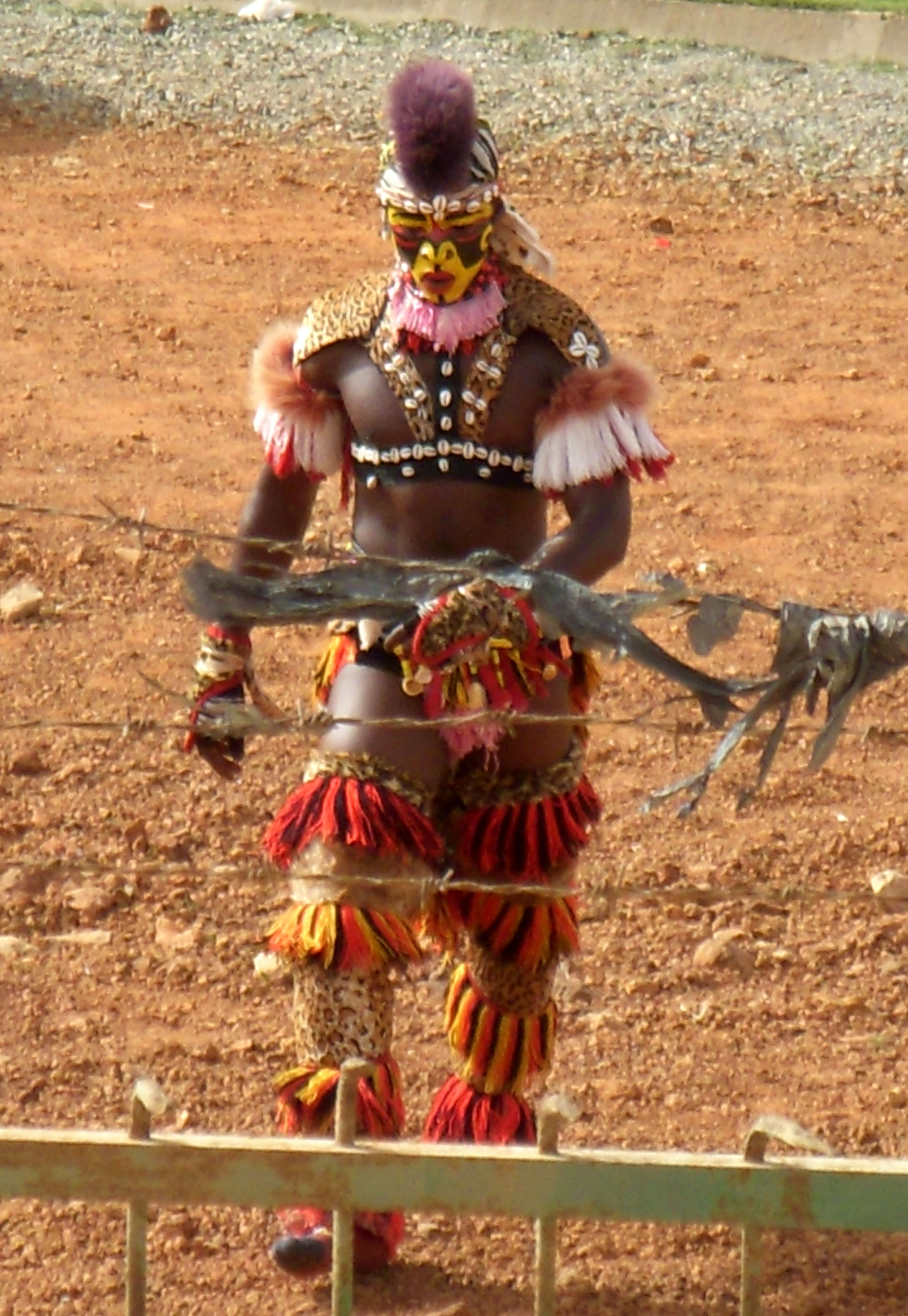
A "false lion" (simb) dancer who participates in the ceremony prior to matches

Senegalese wrestlers, youth in specific, struggle with dropping out of school to pursue wrestling as well, prompting notable names in the sport to speak out against the issue saying their education is more important.

== Media ==
In April 2008 a BBC documentary entitled Last Man Standing covered the lives of a group of British and American hopefuls at a boot camp in Senegal who took on Senegalese opponents. Laamb was featured in the 2005 film L'Appel des arènes (English title Wrestling Grounds). The documentary Laamb directed by Kristoffer Hegnsvad follows young wrestlers in Dakar during a major tournament, the film was narrated by Jørgen Leth and premiered at Copenhagen International Documentary Film Festival - CPH:DOX in 2013.

== Etymology ==
Laamb is the Wolof word for wrestling, which is borrowed from Serer Fara-Lamb Siin. The Serer word for wrestling is njom, which derives from the Serer word jom (heart or honour).

== Champions ==
Since the 1950s, Senegalese Wrestling, like its counterparts in other areas of West Africa, has become a major spectator sport and cultural event. The champions of traditional wrestling events are celebrities in Senegal, with fighters such as Balla Gaye 2, Yékini (Yakhya Diop), Tyson (Mohamed Ndao), and Bombardier (Serigne Ousmane Dia) the best known. Pathe Mbeurou Askanewi Boye, also known as Big Pato, is the first ever Senegalese wrestler who is also a police officer.

== Wrestling stadiums ==
The National Wrestling Arena in Pikine is the largest wrestling stadium of Senegal. It has a capacity of 20,000. It took 28 months to build the stadium.

Stadium	Capacity	City
National Wrestling Arena	20,000	Pikine

== Bibliography ==
- Senghor, Léopold Sédar, Brunel, Pierre, "Poésie complète," CNRS éditions, 2007, ISBN 2-271-06604-2
- Tang, Patricia, Masters of the sabar: Wolof griot percussionists of Senegal, p144. Temple University Press, 2007. ISBN 1-59213-420-3
- Gravrand, Henry: "L’HERITAGE SPIRITUEL SEREER : VALEUR TRADITIONNELLE D’HIER, D’AUJOURD’HUI ET DE DEMAIN" [in] Ethiopiques, numéro 31, révue socialiste de culture négro-africaine, 3e trimestre 1982
- Gravrand, Henry, "La Civilisation Sereer, Pangool." Les Nouvelles Edition Africaines. 1990.
- Diouf, Niokhobaye. "Chronique du royaume du Sine." Suivie de notes sur les traditions orales et les sources écrites concernant le royaume du Sine par Charles Becker et Victor Martin. (1972). Bulletin de l'Ifan, Tome 34, Série B, n° 4, (1972)
- Faye, Louis Diène, "Mort et Naissance Le Monde Sereer," Les Nouvelles Edition Africaines (1983), ISBN 2-7236-0868-9
- Geels, Jolijn. Niger. Bradt London and Globe Pequot New York (2006). ISBN 1-84162-152-8
