= Tiurakh =

Demi-god in the religion of the Serer people

Tiurakh (variations : Théourakh, Thiorak or Tulrakh) is one of the demi-gods of the Serer people of Senegal, the Gambia and Mauritania. In the Serer religion, Tiurakh is regarded as the god of wealth or property. Like his adversary Takhar (the god of justice), they are both venerated and worshipped at the foot of the tallest trees in Serer country.

== Worship ==
Tiurakh is worshipped by the Serer people for materialistic reasons i.e. to acquire and/or retain their wealth such as land, jewellery (usually gold and silver, see Serer ancient history). He is also associated with success and may be evoked if one is starting a new project, for example : going through the Ndut rite, business start up, building a new home, undertaking an examination, cattle or agricultural farming, or venturing into a new contract, etc.

=== Place of worship ===
Like some Serer Pangool, it is believed that the deity Tiurakh resides in the forest, particularly the tallest trees of the forest in certain sacred places. As such, libations are made at the tallest trees found in the forest. The importance of trees in Serer society are found within the Serer creation myth, which posits that, trees were the first things to be created on Earth by the supreme being. Offerings of domesticated animals, fruits, vegetables, etc., are deposited at the foot of the tallest trees. The holy feast which is a public event in the Serer religious calendar, takes place at the appearance of the new moon.

== Views of Serer religion ==
The views of Serer religion regarding the veneration of Tiurakh for selfish reasons is found within the doctrines of the Serer Jom principle. The Jom principle is a Serer philosophy rooted in Serer religion which sets out the values and beliefs that Serer people must abide by. It encompasses, social, economic, personal and political values that every Serer who adhere to the tenets of Serer religion are required to follow. Personal growth is highly encouraged within the Jom, but must not be to the detriment of the collective social group. The deity Tiurakh forbids his veneration or evocation if done for selfish reasons, but especially if done to the detriment of another.

== See also ==
- Faro (mythology)
- Nommo
- Traditional African religion
- List of African deities

== Bibliography ==
- Kellog, Day Otis, and Smith, William Robertson, "The Encyclopædia Britannica: latest edition. A dictionary of arts, sciences and general literature", Volume 25, p 664, Werner (1902)
- "Folk-Lore In The old Testament. Studies In Comparative Religion Legend and Law", Pubslihed by Forgotten Books, pp 317–8, ISBN 1440070156
- Newland, H. Osman; Lewin, Evans, "West Africa : a handbook of practical information for the official, planter, miner, financier & trader", D. O'Connor (1922), p 90
- Laurent-Jean-Baptiste Bérenger-Féraud, "Les peuplades de la Sénégambie: histoire, ethnographie, mœurs et coutumes, légendes, etc", E. Leroux (1879), p 276-7
- Keane, A. H.; Quiggin, A. Hingston; Haddon, A. C., "Man: Past and Present", illustrated, revised, Cambridge University Press (2011), p 49, ISBN 0521234107
- "Africa", Forgotten Books, p 143, ISBN 1440091307
- Gravrand, Henry : "L’HERITAGE SPIRITUEL SEREER : VALEUR TRADITIONNELLE D’HIER, D’AUJOURD’HUI ET DE DEMAIN" [in] Ethiopiques, numéro 31, révue socialiste de culture négro-africaine, 3^{e} trimestre 1982
