= Faro =

Faro may refer to:

== Places ==
=== Africa ===
- Faro (department), North Province, Cameroon
- Faro National Park, Cameroon
- Faro River, tributary of the Benue River

=== Americas ===
- Faro, Pará, Brazil, a municipality
- Faro, Yukon, Canada, a town
  - Faro (Canadian electoral district)
  - Faro Airport (Yukon)
  - Faro/Johnson Lake Water Aerodrome
- Faro, Missouri, US, an unincorporated community
- Faro, North Carolina, US, an unincorporated community

=== Europe ===
- Faro (Portuguese district), the southern district covering the Algarve in southern Portugal
  - Faro, Portugal, the municipality and main city of the district
  - Faro Airport, the main regional airport in the district
  - Roman Catholic Diocese of Faro, serving the district
- Farø, an island in Denmark
- Fårö, a Swedish island in the Baltic Sea
- Faro Point, the northeastern point of Sicily, Italy

=== Extraterrestrial ===
- 9358 Fårö, a main belt asteroid

== People ==
- Saint Faro, Roman Catholic Bishop of Meaux, France
- Faro (surname)
- Faro, pen name of editors Faith and A. Ross Eckler Jr. (1927–2016)

== FARO ==
- Fábrica de Artes y Oficios Oriente, a cultural center and training facility in Mexico City
- Grupo FARO (Foundation for the Advance of Reforms and Opportunities), a think tank in Ecuador

== Other uses ==
- Faro (card game), a popular form of gambling predating poker
- Faro (beer), a type of Belgian ale
- Count of Faro, a Portuguese title of nobility
- Faro (mythology), a deity prominent in the Mandé creation narrative
- the title character of Buddy Faro, a 1998 television series, portrayed by Dennis Farina
- Faro, a liturgical item burned in Ambrosian Rite churches on feasts of martyrs
- Faro (restaurant), a defunct Michelin star establishment in New York City, US

== See also ==
- El Faro (disambiguation)
- Odmar Færø (born 1989), Faroese footballer
- Faroe Islands
- Faroe (disambiguation)
- Faros (disambiguation)
- Farro, a wheat plant also known as Emmer
- Ferro (disambiguation)
- Pharao, a German Eurodance band
- Pharaoh (disambiguation)
- Faros (disambiguation)
- Faros, a Greek village
- Pharo (disambiguation)
- Pharo, programming language
- Pharos (disambiguation)
