= Farro (surname) =

Farro is a Catalan and Italian surname. Notable people with the surname include:

- José Escajadillo Farro (born 1942), Peruvian composer
- Josh Farro (born 1987), American musician and songwriter
- Maria Elena Foronda Farro, Peruvian sociologist and environmentalist
- Mónica Farro (born 1976), Uruguayan model and actress
- Ricardo Farro (born 1985), Peruvian football player
- Sarah Farro, 19th century American novelist
- Zac Farro (born 1990), American musician, singer and songwriter, brother of Josh

== See also ==
- El Putget i Farró, a neighbourhood in Barcelona, Spain
- Faro
- Farrow
- Pharaoh
