= Pharo (disambiguation) =

Pharo is an open source programming language.

Pharo may also refer to:

- a German name for Faro, a card game
- Pharo Management, a hedge fund established in 2000
- Helge Pharo (born 1943), Norwegian historian
- Kgakgamotso Pharo (born 1982), Botswana footballer

== See also ==
- Pharo House, Middletown, Delaware, United States, a home on the National Register of Historic Places
- Palais du Pharo, a palace in Marseille, France
- Faro (disambiguation)
- Pharos (disambiguation)
- Pharaoh (disambiguation)
