= Pharos (disambiguation) =

The Pharos of Alexandria was an ancient lighthouse, one of the Seven Wonders of the ancient world.

Pharos may also refer to:

== Lighthouses ==
- The Pharos, either of two Roman lighthouses at Dubris (Dover, England)
- Pharos Lighthouse (Fleetwood), Fleetwood, England

== Other uses ==
- Pharos (crater), a crater on Neptune's moon Proteus
- Pharos (horse), a British racehorse
- Pharos (polis), the ancient Greek name of the Croatian island Hvar
- Pharos (album), an album by the band SETI
- Pharos, a character in Persona 3, a video game
- NLV Pharos, a lighthouse tender operated by the Northern Lighthouse Board around the coasts of Scotland and the Isle of Man
- The Pharos Project, a driving element in the plot of the Doctor Who episode "Logopolis"
- Pharos, a novel by Guy Haley in The Horus Heresy series

== See also ==
- Faros (disambiguation)
- Faros, a Greek village
- Faro (disambiguation)
- Pharo (disambiguation)
- Pharo, a programming language
- Pharaohs, common title of the monarchs of ancient Egypt
- Hvar, Croatian island in the Adriatic Sea whose Greek name is Pharos
