= The Pharaohs (disambiguation) =

At least three bands have used the name Pharaohs:

- A 1960s American pop music group fronted by Sam the Sham.
- The Pharaohs, a soul/jazz/funk band formed in 1962 and active in the seventies, featuring Maurice White.
- A metal band from Fredericton, N.B. formed in 2008.

== See also ==
- Pharaoh (disambiguation)
