= Takhar =

Demi-god in the Serer religion

Takhar or Taahkarr (in Serer and Cangin) is a demi-god in the Serer religion worshipped by many Serers (an ethnic group found in Senegal, the Gambia and Mauritania). Takhar is the god of justice and vengeance in Serer religion and worshipped at the foot of certain trees in the forest deemed to be sacred. The Serer priestly class play a crucial role in the evokation of the demi-god and the implementation of its laws that devotees adhere to.

== Worship ==
The Serer people worship Takhar in order to appeal to him against the injuries, oppression or evil magic inflicted by other. Takhar is worshipped at the foot of trees, and in the new moon, the atmospheric spirits of the air and night are "conjured with mysterious incarnations". Offerings to Takhar are deposited at the foot of the tallest trees in the forest. Cattle and poultry are sacrificed and taken to the sacred sanctuary, along with millet, fruits and vegetables. Like the offerings to certain Pangool (singular :Fangool, the Serer saints and spirits represented by snakes), the holy feast takes place in the sacred forest.

The snake also held a high place in the national pantheon, and was often known to appear in various disguises, even "assuming the uniform of an aged officer of the empire" [Second Empire].

The transmigration of souls is a strongly held belief in Serer religion as evident in Serer funeral rituals.

=== Place of worship ===
The god Takhar is worshipped in the forests in Serer country, more specifically, in certain sacred places, such as the Sine-Saloum area of present-day Senegal. Somewhat similar to the Pangool, the Serer people believe that both Takhar and his adversary Tiurakh (god of wealth and property) reside in the tallest trees of the forest. It is partly for this reason why plants and animals are regarded as totems in the Serer-totemic and sentient worldly-view of nature in general, and afforded high spiritual status and respect, because these ancient trees are believed to be the sanctuaries of certain Serer entities.

=== Priests of Takhar ===
The high priests of Takhar are usually very old men from notable Serer families. These Serer high priests preside over all cases relating to law and order, i.e. theft, witchcraft, etc. In the past, these high priests (the Saltigues) would concoct doses of poison which they would administer to the accused witch, taken orally. However, these concoctions were deliberately never made fatal enough to cause death. These high priests mostly depended on the fear of Takhar as dispenser of justice and vengeance, than their poisons.

== Patronage ==
As the god of justice, Takhar is the perpetual patron of all those who work within the judiciary and pass judgement on legal issues. In Serer ancient history, that role was primarily reserved for the Serer lamanic class.

== Bibliography ==
- Kellog, Day Otis, and Smith, William Robertson, "The Encyclopædia Britannica: latest edition. A dictionary of arts, sciences and general literature", Volume 25, p 664, Werner (1902)
- "Folk-Lore In The old Testament. Studies In Comparative Religion Legend and Law", Pubslihed by Forgotten Books, pp 317–8, ISBN 1440070156
- Newland, H. Osman; Lewin, Evans, "West Africa : a handbook of practical information for the official, planter, miner, financier & trader", D. O'Connor (1922), p 90
- Laurent-Jean-Baptiste Bérenger-Féraud, "Les peuplades de la Sénégambie: histoire, ethnographie, mœurs et coutumes, légendes, etc", E. Leroux (1879), p 276-7
- Keane, A. H.; Quiggin, A. Hingston; Haddon, A. C., "Man: Past and Present", illustrated, revised, Cambridge University Press (2011), p 49, ISBN 0521234107
- "Africa", Forgotten Books, p 143, ISBN 1440091307
