= Ciiɗ (Serer religion) =

Reincarnation in Serer religion

Ciiɗ (variations: Ciiƭ, Ciid, or Cyid) is the Serer process of a spirit's (o laaw) incarnation or reincarnation found within the tenets of Serer religion (A fat Roog). In the Serer language, "Ciiɗ", in its literal definition is the reincarnated or the dead who seek to reincarnate or the pre-foetal spirit. This Ciiɗ has the capability to reincarnate and become a man. In A fat Roog (Serer religion/spirituality), only those human Pangool (ancestral spirits) who have reached Jaaniiw (the place where good souls go) are able to reincarnate. Upon the death of an individual, the acceptance of their souls by the ancestors ensures their souls can be guided into Jaaniiw and thereby able to reincarnate and get closer to Roog, the Supreme Deity and Creator in A fat Roog. If their soul is rejected by the ancestors, they become lost and wondering souls, and therefore unable to complete the process of reincarnation.

The notion of the incarnation or manifestation of the Serer Supreme Deity and Creator (Roog) is rejected in Serer religion. However, the reincarnation of the Pangool/soul is a well-held principle in Serer beliefs. The Pangool (singular. Fangool) are themselves holy, and have the ability to intercede between the world of the living and the Divine. In Serer religious doctrines, the respect for children, the veneration of the ancestors, the belief in resurrection and reincarnation and its corollary, an omnipresent morality of Good such as gentleness, fairness, courage, solidarity, honesty, etc., are highly held principles.

The Serer do not subscribe to the belief of the total destruction of the human being upon their death. Instead, the soul must be reincarnated – as for the Serer, "to be born is to die, just as to die is to be born differently" – depending on whether you have lived a good and righteous life on earth in your lifetime. Thus, the soul must return to its natural and purest form or essence for Ciiɗ to take effect and runs its full course, and that depends on one’s conduct and way of life during their lifetime, including whether they have acted in accordance with the Serer "Jom" philosophy–which is a code of etiquette and values encompassing religious, social, economic, political, and ecological conduct, cohesion and unity amongst the Serer people. In essence, this calls for a total unity and kinship amongst the Serer people which manifested in religious and cultural life. This unity can be felt in everyday Serer life such as in Serer dances, music (e.g., the Njuup), Ndut rite of passage, etc. Professor Issa Laye Thiaw writes that:

"[…] There is therefore no confusion between the ciid, pre-foetal breath, and sperm. According to tradition, the ciid gives the child the physical and moral characteristics of his parents, that is to say his personality. As for the ngoodaay or ndac sperm, it gives it only bones and flesh. These beliefs lead us to observe that traditional Seereer society was neither fanatic nor dogmatic. Its philosophy was based on causalism."

Professor Molefi Kete Asante posits that, as with many other Traditional African religions, death constitutes "another mode of existence, rather than an end of life" and life can be viewed as being "born out of death and that death is the prolongation of life."

== Categories ==
The Ciiɗ is divided into two distinct categories: good Ciiɗ and bad Ciiɗ. The latter is referred to xon faaf in Serer (singular. o qon-o-paaf). They are believed to be evil spirits that usually results in abnormal births or rickety children–who may not always live long. The Ciiɗ manifest themselves to the woman through dreams but in a discreet manner. Without realising, the woman receives the bad Ciiɗ in her feotus. Through the dream, the dead person who wants to reincarnate presents themselves in the form of a human being or an animal. To ward of the evil spirit, the woman will be required by a Saltigi (a Serer high priest) to wear a gris-gris and say regular prayers in order to neutralise the harmful act during fertility." Thus "xon faaf seeks either to drag men into the wake of death, or to reincarnate" and are generally viewed as spirits that haunt tombs, cause draught and bad harvests. They are the "soul-sucking living dead" in the Serer worldview that cannot be seen unless they allow themselves to be seen.

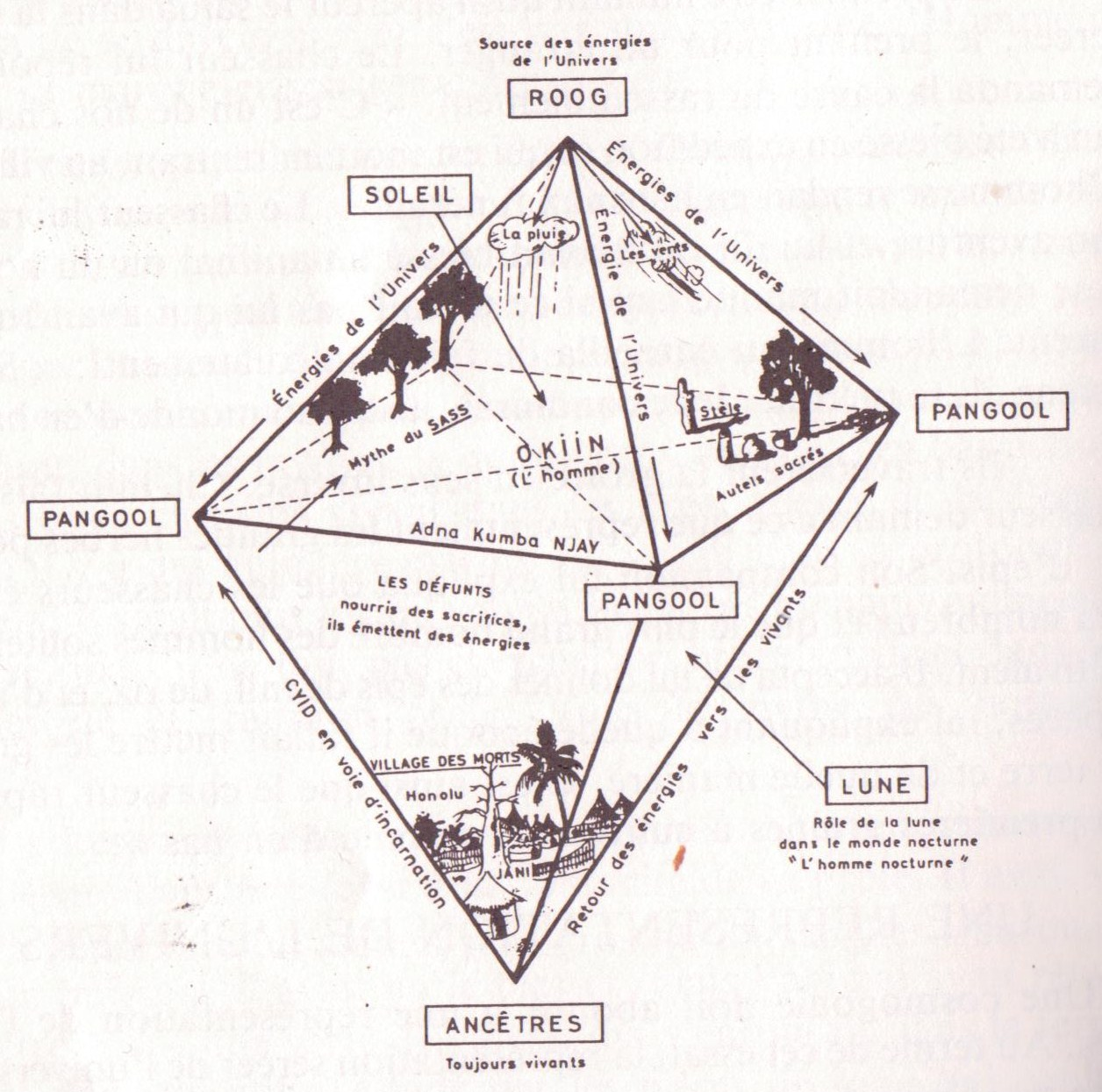
Serer cosmogonical representation of the Universe. The three worlds: the invisible world, the terrestrial world and the nocturnal world. (Henry Gravrand, La civilisation sereer Pangool (1990)).

== Process ==
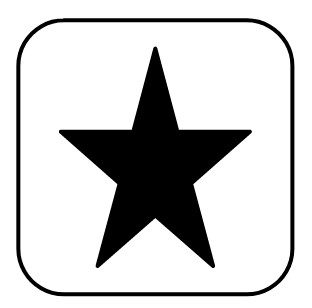
Yoonir, symbol of the Universe in Serer cosmogony and cosmology.

When a person dies, their soul or "double" transforms into an animal, usually a black snake, hence why it is taboo in Serer culture to kill snakes. The serpent is the symbol of the Serer Pangool (the two coiled black snakes – representing the Serer Pangool/ancestral spirits), and there is a sacred relationship between the serpent and the Serer primordial trees whose genesis are preserved in Serer cosmogony.

To reach Jaaniiw, the soul would transform itself into a black snake. After the transformation, the serpent then hides in a tree. In the Serer worldview, a snake hiding in a tree has two main symbolic meanings. It can either mean that a person has died and his soul has reincarnated (Ciiɗ) or a person may die. If the latter is the case, then killing a snake would trigger their early death. The ngaan mbul tree (celtis integrifolia) or a mboy xa nafad is pivotal in this reincarnation process. This tree supports the dual serpent-man, beneath which is a big hole where the undead take residence.

The Ciiɗ or pre-feotal spirit, watches for a favorable condition and place for example, ceremonies, forests, wells, or isolated places, with the view of reincarnating in the womb of a chosen mother.

From conception and for the entirety of its earthly life, the o laaw (the soul) is incarnated in man. The being then passes to a phase called o qon-o-paaf (a departing dead person)–which corresponds to a period of semi-freedom while waiting for the "soiled human envelope" (o xop ole) that served as its attachment to be destroyed. Upon burial, the being is completely freed of the body under the status of a fangool (plural of pangool, ancestral spirits), and thus, completed the natural cycle and joins the Divine. These five stages of the soul's cycle are depicted and symbolised in the Serer five-pointed star, Yoonir.

== See also ==
- Serer ancient history
- Timeline of Serer history
- Traditional African religion
- African diaspora religions

== Bibliography ==
- Faye, Louis Diène, "Mort et Naissance Le Monde Sereer." Les Nouvelles Edition Africaines (1983), ISBN 2-7236-0868-9
- Gravrand, Henry, "La Civilisation Sereer: Pangool", vol. 2. Les Nouvelles Editions Africaines du Senegal (1990), ISBN 2-7236-1055-1
- Gravrand, Henry, "La civilisation sereer: Cosaan : les origines", vol. 1, Nouvelles Editions africaines (1983), ISBN 2-7236-0877-8
- Thiaw, Issa laye, "Mythe de la création du monde selon les sages sereer", pp. 45–50, 59-61 [in] "Enracinement et Ouverture" – "Plaidoyer pour le dialogue interreligieux", Konrad Adenauer Stiftung (23 and 24 June 2009), Dakar (Retrieved: 30 March 2025)
- Thiaw, Issa Laye "La femme Seereer." Sénégal, Sociétés africaines et diaspora. Edition L'Harmattan (2005), ISBN 2-7475-8907-2
- Diouf, Babacar S., "Le fond spirituel de l'unité seereer." (2001)
- Thaiw, Issa Laye, « La religiosité des Seereer, avant et pendant leur islamisation », in Éthiopiques, no. 54, volume 7, 2e semestre 1991
- Gravrand, Henry, "L'Heritage spirituel Sereer : Valeur traditionnelle d'hier, d'aujourd'hui et de demain" [in] Ethiopiques, numéro 31, révue socialiste de culture négro-africaine, 3e trimestre 1982.
- Denise Martin [in] Asante, Molefi Kete, "Encyclopedia of African Religion." (2008), retrieved 30 Macrh 2025
- Diouf. Léon. "Eglise locale et crise africaine: le diocèse de Dakar." KARTHALA Editions (2001) ISBN 9782845861718 (retrieved 30 March 2025)
- McIntosh, Roderick J.; Tainter, Joseph A.; McIntosh, Susan Keech (editors.) "The Way the Wind Blows: Climate Change, History, and Human Action." Columbia University Press (2012), ISBN 9780231528801 (retrieved 30 March 2025)
- Kalis, Simone, "Médecine traditionnelle, religion et divination ches les Seereer Siin du Sénégal" –La connaissance de la nuit, L’Harmattan, (1997) ISBN 2-7384-5196-9
- Madiya, Clémentine Faïk-Nzuji, "Canadian Museum of Civilization", Canadian Centre for Folk Culture Studies, "International Centre for African Language, Literature and Tradition", (Louvain, Belgium), ISBN 0-660-15965-1
