= Serer creation myth =

Creation myth from West Africa

The Serer creation myth is the traditional creation myth of the Serer people of Senegal, the Gambia and Mauritania. Many Serers who adhere to the tenets of the Serer religion believe these narratives to be sacred. Some aspects of Serer religious and Ndut traditions are included in the narratives contained herein but are not limited to them.

The Serer people have many gods, goddesses and Pangool (the Serer saints and ancestral spirits represented by snakes), but one supreme deity and creator called Roog (or Koox in the Cangin languages).

Serer creation myth developed from Serer oral traditions, Serer religion, legends, and cosmogonies. The specifics of the myth are also found in two main Serer sources: A nax and A leep. The former is a short narrative for a short myth or proverbial expression, whilst the latter is for a more developed myth. Broadly, they are equivalent to verbs and logos respectively, especially when communicating fundamental religious education such as the supreme being and the creation of the Universe. In addition to being fixed-Serer sources, they set the structure of the myth.

The creation myth of the Serer people is intricately linked to the first trees created on Planet Earth by Roog. Earth's formation began with a swamp. The Earth was not formed until long after the creation of the first three worlds: the waters of the underworld; the air which included the higher world (i.e. the sun, the moon and the stars) and earth. Roog is the creator and fashioner of the Universe and everything in it. The creation is based on a mythical cosmic egg and the principles of chaos.

== Common elements ==
There are slightly different and competing versions of the myth. However, there are more similarities than differences, and the differences complement each other in the greater understanding of Serer creation mythology. They all posit that the Universe and everything in it was created by Roog (or Koox among the Cangin), and the creation of Planet Earth was a result of a swamp which the first tree grew within. The first three worlds created through a mythical egg and under the principles of chaos were: the waters of the underworld, the air including the higher world and earth. These three were the first primordial worlds created by the supreme being through thought, speech and action. Planet Earth was not created until long after the creation of these worlds. The contentious points are, which of the main sacred trees in Serer society (below) grew not just first, but also within the primordial swamp on Earth:

1. Saas (var: Sas) - Acacia albida
2. Nquƭ (var: Ngud or NGuƭ) - Guiera senegalensis
3. Somb - Prosopis africana a species of Prosopis
4. Nqual (var: Ngaul or NGawal) - Mitragyna inermis, part of the genus Mitragyna of the family Rubiaceae
5. Mbos - Gardenia ternifolia

The importance of these trees are crucial to the formation of Earth, at least in the Serer worldview and their genesis are addressed in their relevant sections. Being the first tree does not necessarily equate to being the first living thing on Earth. In the creation myth, animals such as the jackal, hyena, the serpent and ostrich figure prominently in the competing creation narrative. In some narratives, trees and animals merge in order to justify their legitimacy. These mythical animals may be seen as sacred and totems, in the Serer totemic and sentient worldly-view of animals and nature in general. The significance of trees in the Serer creation myth does not mean the dwelling place of the supreme deity, neither do they mean the dwelling place of the devil. They are dwelling places for the sanctified ancestral spirits (Pangool). The cult of the tree is symbolic in Serer religion. The feminine world also played a crucial role in the creation process of the Universe and the first-humans. This is linked to the Serer philosophy of beauty and Serer-numbers found in Serer religious symbolism, with number 3 symbolizing the feminine world, number 4 the masculine world and number 7 (3 + 4) representing balance and perfection, something the Serers try to achieve in their daily lives and the environment they find themselves in.

Before the existence of the Universe, Roog existed by itself. There was nothing but silence and darkness. The Serer notion of balance and perfection illustrates the creation of the higher spiritual order and corresponds to the motif of chaos. Its creation was the union of male and female principles, with Roog, the supreme transcendental principle entity, becoming the embodiment of an androgynous Godfather and Godmother. However, it is from the female component of the supreme being: "Noo tiig tew" ("out of a female womb" - ex utero), that the divine brought forth the ancestors of modern humans, with a female, being the first to be created. There was a mythical speech − the first word[s] uttered by the supreme being. All the competing versions attest to that. This myth is the general consensus and represents the absolute truth in Serer primordial time. A major competing myth, also based on chaos, postulates that, there was originally a series of explosions. However, it agrees pretty much with the accepted view that trees and animals were the first to be created. Explosion first arose in the vegetable kingdom and the first tree Somb, according to this myth, bursted, which the seeds of all the plant species in the world sprang out (from its trunk) covering Planet Earth with life. In all versions, Roog appears as both the creator and demiurge.

== Cosmogony ==
Serer cosmogony is not as rich as the Dogon's. Religious and ethnic persecution of the Serers for several centuries had resulted in their migration to and fro. In spite of this turbulent history, the Serer people have the richest cosmogony of all the Senegambian ethnic groups.

=== Creation of the Universe ===
==== A nax and A leep ====
The Serers relates the creation myth and the role of speech in the formation of the Universe. Two Serer terms expresses the mythical creation word: "A nax" and "A leep". The former is a short narrative for a short myth or proverbial expression and is equivalent to a verb. The latter (A leep) is more advanced and details the mythical creation word and the creation itself, introducing the myth with the phrase: "Naaga reetu reet" (so it was in the beginning), before narrating the event. From a global perspective, the two roughly corresponds to verb and logos, especially when communicating fundamental religious education relating to the supreme deity and the creation of the Universe. They form the structure and sources under which the creation narrative is based. "A leep", the logos, is fixed.

The creation of the Universe is based on several parts (see below):

1. the structure which sets the basis of the narrative and the significance of the mythical word cited

by the supreme being (see above);

2. the creation process based on Serer-numbers;
3. the genesis of the Universe;
4. the prologue of the primordial myth based on three key elements: water, air and earth;
5. the primordial ocean and the formation of Planet Earth;
6. the rotational motion around the axis of the world, the creation of trees and plant life;
7. the creation of animals;
8. the creation of humans and the first male and female couple whose children and descendants went on to populate the world;
9. the crisis that befell Planet Earth and the separation of man and animal, and why the dog became man's friend;
10. intervention of Roog and the process of divine intervention in the various stages of the creation and after the initial disorder;
11. Serer representation of the Universe – the three worlds: the invisible world from above, the diurnal terrestrial world and the nocturnal world.

==== Process of the creation (Serer-number 3) ====
The source of the Universe is attributed to the feminine and maternal nature of Roog. In Serer symbolism, the number 3 is attributed to the feminine world. This number is the ingredient of the creation process. There were three essential elements, three parts of the cosmos and three worlds. This triple rhythm of Roog and the cosmos is also found in women as the Serer myth relates it:

"Roog a binda adna noo tiig tew" (Roog has created the world of its feminine nature)."

The phrase "Tiig Tew" is attributed to the feminine body of motherhood and is equivalent to the general saying of Mother Earth. The phrase "No tiig tew" translates to "out of a female womb" - ex utero. The language here is symbolic. The Serer religion and oral tradition confers to Roog some rather realistic aspects of the initial creation. There were three phases in the gestation of the creatures within the devine being:

1. by thought - within the living divine egg, Roog developed the forms and beings to create. It laid the foundations and signs for things to come.
2. by word - Roog started the gestation period and provided everything by word for the smooth realization of its plan.
3. by action - through its maternal nature, Roog opened-up and projected the embryo and placenta in a similar fashion as in childbirth.

Roog did not create, nor did it engender all beings of all kinds. It simply created the archetypes, not the prototype of each species, but seven archetypes namely :' the three essential elements (air, earth and water) and the top four seeds (the first tree, first animal and the first human couple - female, then male).

==== Genesis of the Universe (mythical words) ====
The genesis of the Universe is found in "A nax" and "A leep". Which posits that: "In the beginning, there was nothing but darkness and silence until the pre-existent being, Roog, began the genesis of the world" [the Universe]. The Serer oral tradition does not speak of Roog's gestation, probably due to cultural taboo, but only when the mythical word was uttered and what was uttered by the supreme being, which is found in A nax. According to A nax, the first mythical words spoken by Roog were:

WATER! AIR! EARTH!

A leep details the scene of the primordial time in the following terms:

"A leep à joon maaga
a roxondox o maaga,
a gad'wa roog,
a saay'a lang ke."

Which translates to:

The Words leap into space,
He carried the sea on his head,
the firmament on his shoulders,
the earth in his hands.

The mythical words established the three worlds (water, air and earth) based on the prologue of the Serer genesis provided by A nax. In A leep, it gives the order in which they were created and elaborated on it. A leep posits that, with the words of Roog, the three worlds (the Universe) began to take shape. The first to be created was the deep sea waters (waters of the underworld); the second was air including the high heavens (Kuul na, in Serer) such as the sun, the moon and the stars; and third was earth. However, the Earth was not one of the first primordial worlds to be formed. It will take a long time before the waters and the Earth were separated.

==== First swamp and creation of Earth (Nqaul) ====
The creation of Planet Earth is based on the myth of Nqaul (a type of tree - Mitragyna inermis). In this myth, the formation of the Earth was started by a swamp. Swamps are integral to Serer culture and traditions and have parallels with this Nqaul. The foundation of Serer villages, towns, homes, etc., in many cases, began with a swamp, even today. Nqaul is also significant in the history of the Serers. At a time when rainfall were plentiful, during the rainy season, the founders of ancient Serer villages and towns were often surprise when the first rainfalls brought flooding (see Saltigue). Calibrated archaeological dating have shown that, many of the places they had chosen to settle next to were shoals. Serer tradition states, on one occasion, the flooding caused severe damage resulting in many people losing their homes, crops and food they had farmed. After the damage, the people who escaped returned to assess the damage and commiserated each other. They recalled an ancient myth − the myth of Nqaul:

"Ko adoox a adax Nqaul" (You start like the beginning of Nqaul).

This phrase evokes the primordial swamp and the Nqaul tree which grew within the original swamp. This tradition is still retained by the Serers as the saying is so widespread in Serer country. It is a different kind of tree to Saas (acacia albida). Whilst some Serer sources postulates that the Saas was the first tree on Earth, the Serer oral tradition states that the Saas was not Nqual (the original tree in the swamp). Instead, Saas is attributed to one of the sacred trees useful for overall-bodily health. Another sacred tree − the Nquƭ, is also thought to have been the first tree. However, the general consensus is that the Nquƭ which has the properties to cure snakebite grew on the river bank whilst Nqual grew inside the primordial swamp.

==== Rotational movement around the axis of the world ====
According to the Serer narrative, this initial islet was not static, but animated by a whirl around the axis of the world. The Serers were able to symbolize the Earth's axis and the whirl in a geometrical diagram. In Serer cosmology, the diagram depicts two crossed lines representing the rotational motion and the intersection points representing the axis of the world. One of the lines depicts the axis running from east to west, the other from north to south. Simultaneously, they are the Empyrean Heaven where the supreme deity is said to have given way to the first elements. In the myth, Roog is portrayed as the mythical deity who somehow "turned its self on". As the deity rotate in space, its rapid motions expanded with the primordial world it had first created. Roog's motion also affected the axis of the cosmos. The vital energies it had emitted, rotated in a spiral motion thereby creating the celestial objects.

Since the time of the ancient Serer Lamanes, the Serer people have represented the axis of the world in the form of a stele, symbolizing the steles of Roog. In the Serer home, sometimes in the courtyard, they represent the most sacred place of the house servicing as the centre of gravity of divine energies and one of the poles of the coronation. In the home, these steles are made of wooden slabs, forming a sacred wood. Sometimes they are raised steles supported by three rods and sometimes they are just green trees. There symbolism can be celestial or terrestrial depending on the arrangement of rods that surround them. If there are twelve rods arranged in a circle, they symbolize the celestial world, four rods forming a square symbolizes the earthly world. They are always built based on the tenets of Serer symbolism, and form the family shrine devoted to the supreme being (see Serer ancient history).

==== Creation of trees and vegetation ====
===== Nqaul =====
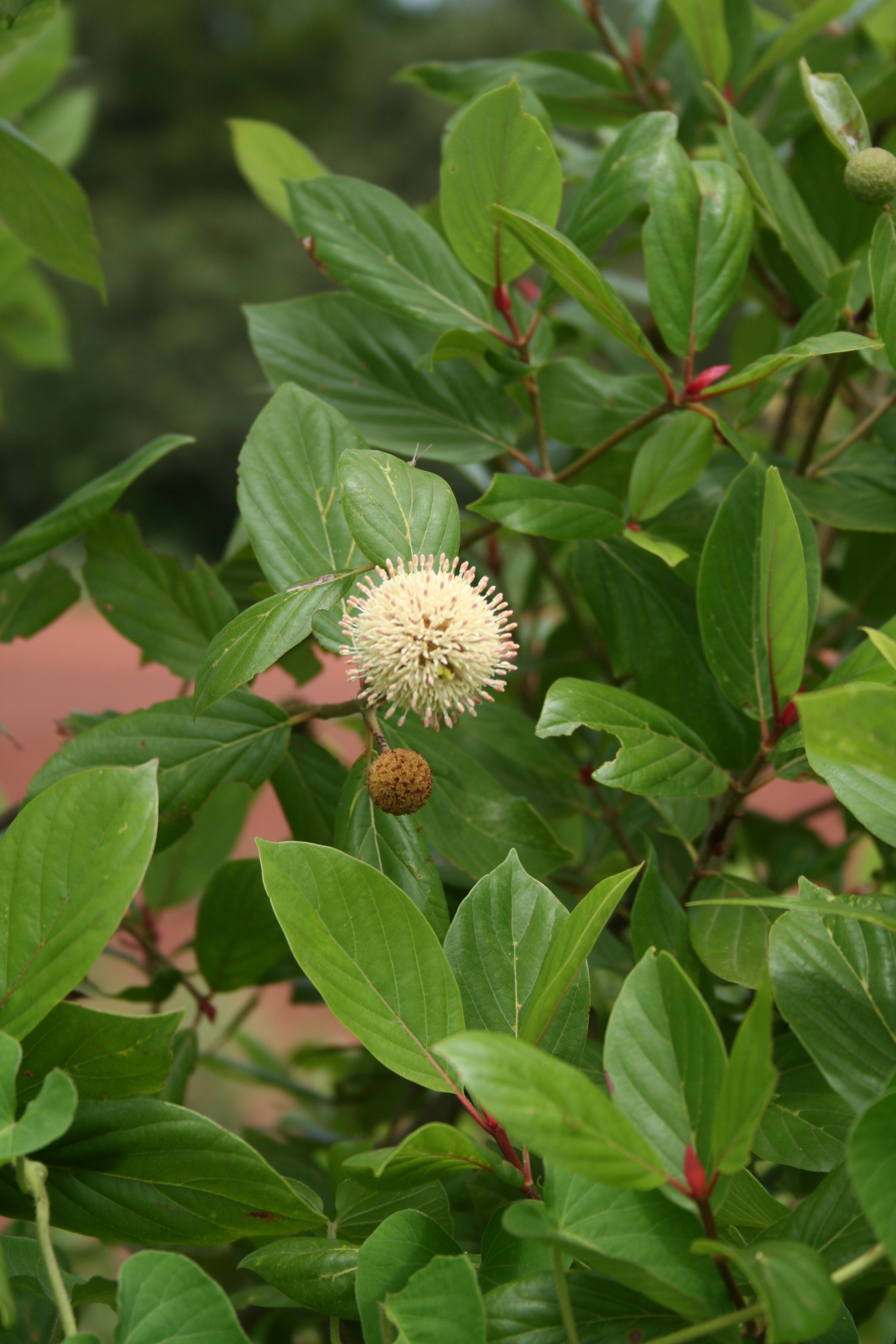
Nqaul: Known by various name, its current scientific name is Mitragyna inermis, part of the genus Mitragyna in the family Rubiaceae (2012). The barks, leaves and roots of the tree are used in many parts of West Africa for human and veterinary medicine. Found in Senegal to the Congo mainly in frequently flooded river banks and flood plains.

The creation of the first trees and vegetation are preserved in the Serer oral tradition. The Serer religion offer guidance based on the primordial seed. This has been a matter of interpretation, and such, there are competing versions as to which trees were first created and the order in which they appeared. In Serer society, trees are viewed as sacred entities and some trees are afforded higher religious status depending on the Pangool (the ancient Serer saints and ancestral spirits represented by snakes) affiliated with them, their medicinal and spiritual value to Serer life, etc. Some Serer families are also associated with certain Pangool (singular: Fangool). The Serer priestly class (the Saltigues), guardians of Serer religion, sciences and ethics, still cannot agree on which tree was first created on Earth nor the order in which the first trees appeared. These differences are probably due to the vast areas the proto-Serers once inhabited. At present, the Nqaul (proper: NGawul, var: Ngaul or - mitragyna inermis) and Nquƭ tree represents the orthodox and prevailing Serer view, hence in the myth of Earth's creation, a planet which was supposed to have come about as a result of a primordial a swamp, the Nqaul tree grew within the swamp whilst the Nquƭ grew on the river bank thereby making them the first trees on Earth according to the Serer creation mythology, with Nqaul taking precedence as it grew within the primordial swamp. In the creation myth, Saas is afforded high spiritual and medicinal status as one of the ancient trees, and form part of Serer representation of the Universe. However, it was not the original tree, and it was the tree that fell in "disgrace" after it tried to "abuse its powers".

Apart from being the first tree and linked to Earth's creation, many of the original narratives of Nqaul has been lost to history. In Serer country, it is used both as a medicinal and veterinary plant for curing various ailments. The leaves are used against fever, hypertension and to stimulate the intestine; bark decoction for diuretic and to stimulates the intestines against hypertension and fever, etc. The barks are also applied to wounds in order to improve the healing process.

===== Nquƭ =====
The Nquƭ tree (proper: NGuƭ, variation: Ngud - guiera senegalensis) is highly prized for its medicinal properties and is used for curing different kinds of illnesses, wounds and snakebites. Traditional Serer healers specializing in snakebites often use the dried powder in their therapies.

In the Serer narrative, the roots of the tree were believed to move in the underworld for survival. After the initial trees were created, then came other trees. These new trees would send their roots to the closest Nquƭ in order to feed from it before starting their overwintering. After waiting out the winter months, the nourishment they had received from the Nquƭ prior to their overwintering increased their trunk growth. At that time, trees moved and talked. They were migratory trees. They sank deep into the underworld during the day and reappeared at night. The tree is seen as the "tree of luck and good health". In the village of Lang o Maak (now part of present-day Senegal), the tree is venerated: xu'doox o'baal (big guiera senegalensis tree in the shape of a pot). At the time of the ancients, the tree appeared one night and everyone saw it. Someone tried to cut it down and he ended up dead.

The Serers believed that, all trees are like human beings and animals out of the same divine placenta and share the same fate and destiny.

===== Saas =====
The Saas tree (in Serer and some Cangin languages, var: Sas) is the acacia albida tree.

Serer advocates for Saas postulates that, the Saas is the tree of life, and therefore, the origin of life on Earth. Others reject that view, and posits that Saas was not the tree that grew within the primordial swamp and therefore, not the original tree. However, Saas is afforded religious and medicinal status useful for overall bodily health and is viewed as one of the ancient trees but not the original tree. Like the Nqual tree, many of the original narratives have been lost to history. In these contrasting views, some scholars of Serer tradition on the origins of life postulates that, the Saas narrative seems to fit the wider West African creation myth in terms of behaviour and judgement, and any scholar of Serer mythology on the origins of life cannot overlook the importance of Saas.

In this myth, the transcendence is reported to have infused with the acacia seed vital for energy, and the Saas played a pivotal role in the transmission of life. It is believed that, the Saas was once a living tree. The narrative went on to say that, women who wanted to give birth went to it because it was considered to be a lucky tree in the wider Serer mythology and legend. Newborns were also presented to the Saas in order to bring good luck, long life, good health and prosperity to the child's life. In similarity, if an animal went near Saas it was destined to live a long life. According to the myth, the Saas loved human beings and perhaps too much. It would sometimes lower its thorny ends so people can give it a hug. Anyone who saw that immediately knew the Saas wanted their company. It did not move until sunset. It healed the wounded by its barks being rubbed on the bleeding wound. The Saas eventually became exhausting for people when it started to abuse its supernatural powers. It is generally viewed as the tree that fell in disgrace. The ancients called it by the name Nyas, a name which has two meanings: scar or clot. The Myth of Saas still retains a certain degree of importance especially when it concerns the need for vital energy such as: during growth, at the time of marriage, in sickness and after death. It is also viewed by many as the fertility tree. In the Serer representation of the Universe, the Myth of Saas forms part of the geometric diagram.

====== Fertility tree ======
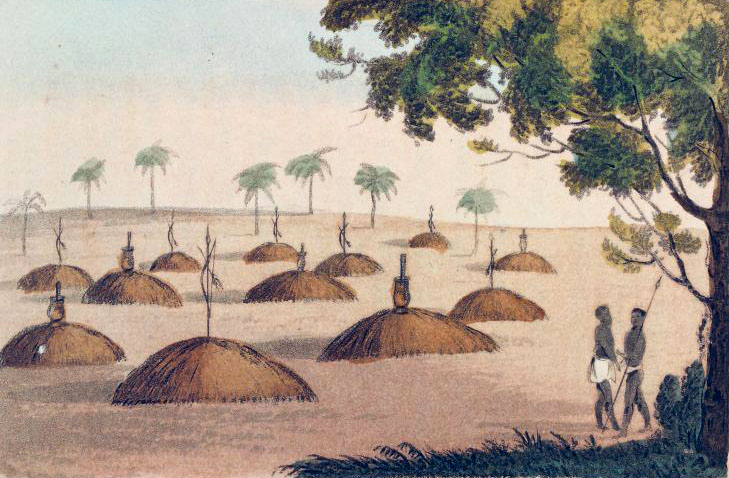
A Serer graveyard with Serer grave diggers (1821)

The Saas is believed to possess fertilizing qualities which is concentrated in its green branches and moisture. These fertilizing components may only be abstracted by the use of its own symbol, communicated through prayer. At the birth of a child, a branch of Saas was deposited at the top of an enclosure where the child and his/her mother remains in seclusion for eight days (the Bat ceremony). The ritual was to ward of evil spirits and as such, a small Saas from a crossroad was chosen. The ritual demands the branch to be placed at the top of the enclosure when the child is asleep, whilst the person performing the ritual cite the appropriate prayers. A small stick of Saas is also worn on the waist by young boys and girls in order to preserve their future fertility. At weddings, a stick of the plant is deposited under the bed of the newlywed in order to improve the fertility of the couple.

Saas also played a major role in ancient Serer funerals. As well as accompanying the dead with grave goods, a stick of Saas was placed inside the tomb of a dead Serer. The purpose of this ritual was to help the dead move on to Jaaniiw (the abode of souls). If this ritual was not performed, the souls of the dead are believed to remain in the living world to the dismay of the living. A stick of Saas (with the Serer-viaticum) in their tomb helps them in their journey to the next life. When Serer men finish off burying the dead, they used to wash their hands in a calabash placed at the entrance of the house. This calabash contained branches of Saas soaked in water. Unlike the trees of the savannah that lose their leaves during the dry season, the Saas is green throughout the dry and rainy seasons. In effect, the Saas was and still is considered by the Serers as a tree of life.

The Saas tree has an economic value to the Serers. Its dual economic role benefits both the agricultural and pastoral Serers. A Saas tree in a field of millets increases millet production. The leaves fertilize the soil, the branches and fruit act as a sort of meadow which saves air thereby preventing Serer herds from starvation. There is also a relationship between Saas density per hectare and the demographic pressure per hectare. An abundant Saas allows crop rotation and intensive farming such as the triangular Diohine-Ngayokhem-Ñakhar (parts of Serer country). In spite of the allegations levied against it by the ancients, many Serers still believe Saas to be the tree of life, the sacred and the transcendence.

===== Mbos =====
Based on the myth of Mbos (gardenia ternifolia), the mbos was the first tree created by the supreme being. However, it grew and kept growing until it reached the supreme being. The creator deity got angry with it, cut off its head and said: "Tree of mbos, return to Earth". Shamed by the words of the deity, the mbos tree quickly returned to earth with its branches intertwined so that no one can climb it or pass under its shadow. When Roog created the ancestors of modern humans (maak - the great or elder), these ancient beings according to the myth hid under the mbos tree. After the creation of these beings, Roog created the dong (the younger). These new beings, wondered the earth trying to find the maak, whom they found hidden under the mbos tree. From that day on, the mbos tree became much in demand for making protective charms. In Serer symbolism, the mbos is the symbol of protection. Mbos means miscarriages, as in the song chanted at night by the initiates in Ndut classical teachings: Wagoxaam Mbos (I locked myself in the Mbos), a song with hidden meaning.

The baobab tree (mbudaay-baak) also holds great religious significance among the Serers and in Serer religion. Like most revered trees in Serer mythology, before this tree can be cut (which is very rare), it is customary to cite the incarnation prayer (jat, muslaay, leemaay) to the axe before cutting the tree down. In the myth, the baobab is seen as a "migratory tree" and thus linked to the first trees on Earth. It can also be an altar and in certain circumstances, a sacred burial place.

===== Somb =====
After the ancients lost confidence in the Saas, the Somb tree (prosopis africana a species of prosopis) was adopted. The Somb is one of the largest and most mysterious trees found in Serer country. Its wood is very hard and resistant to rot. It is harder than cailcedrat and Okoumé. It is the same wood found in the Serer tumuli that are still intact for over a thousand years. The pegs lining the burial chamber of the Serer notables mummified and interred in their tombs have not been not eaten away by termites and are still intact in spite of the passage of time. In 1976–8, Descamp and his team carried out an archaeological excavation of these ancient sites. Gold, silver, armour (a golden pectoral in particular), metal and other grave goods were found in these burial chambers. The town Somb, in present-day Senegal, took its name from this tree. The Somb tree is the symbol of immortality in Serer religious symbolism. The Somb is viewed as the Tree of Life by most Serers who adhere to the tenets of Serer religion. That is the orthodox view. In the creation myth, it is the only tree that provides a strong challenge to the Nqual tree. While Nqual was the first three on Earth since it grew within the primordial swamp, the Somb tree, is the seed that produced it and all the plant species that populated the world.

The creation of Somb by the supreme being is found within the hermeneutics of Serer religion and traditions. By thought, Roog first plotted the shapes of all the trees or plant species yet to come. Through the mythical words, Roog fashioned its placenta on the primordial seed − the seed of the Somb tree. Within this seed, Roog placed all the plant species including their reproductive energies − male and female. Through its feminine principle, Roog opened up and "projected the germ of Somb" which became the bearer of all the plant species found on earth and the underworld. The Somb seed penetrated the earth, the placenta of Roog where it took root and grew. Growing from this placenta, it kept all the plant species within its trunk. When it became a big tree, its trunk swelled diminutively and opened up as if by caesarean section or explosion. From this event, it opened up all the plant species found on Earth, and the rotational movement of the Universe scattered them all over the world. Thus, the vegetable seeds fashioned in the divine egg and deposited in the Somb, brought forth by Roog, were projected into space at the time of the explosion of Somb. This is how the Earth began to be covered with grass, plants and trees. Thus the vegetable seeds were modeled within the supreme being (Roog) and its outputs ex utero. The primordial mythical tree − Somb, was the vector and transmitter of these seeds, carrying their own principles of reproduction. Fertalized by these germs of life, the wetland was carpeted with vegetation and the first forests came into being.

==== Creation of animals (Ɓoxo-koƥ) ====
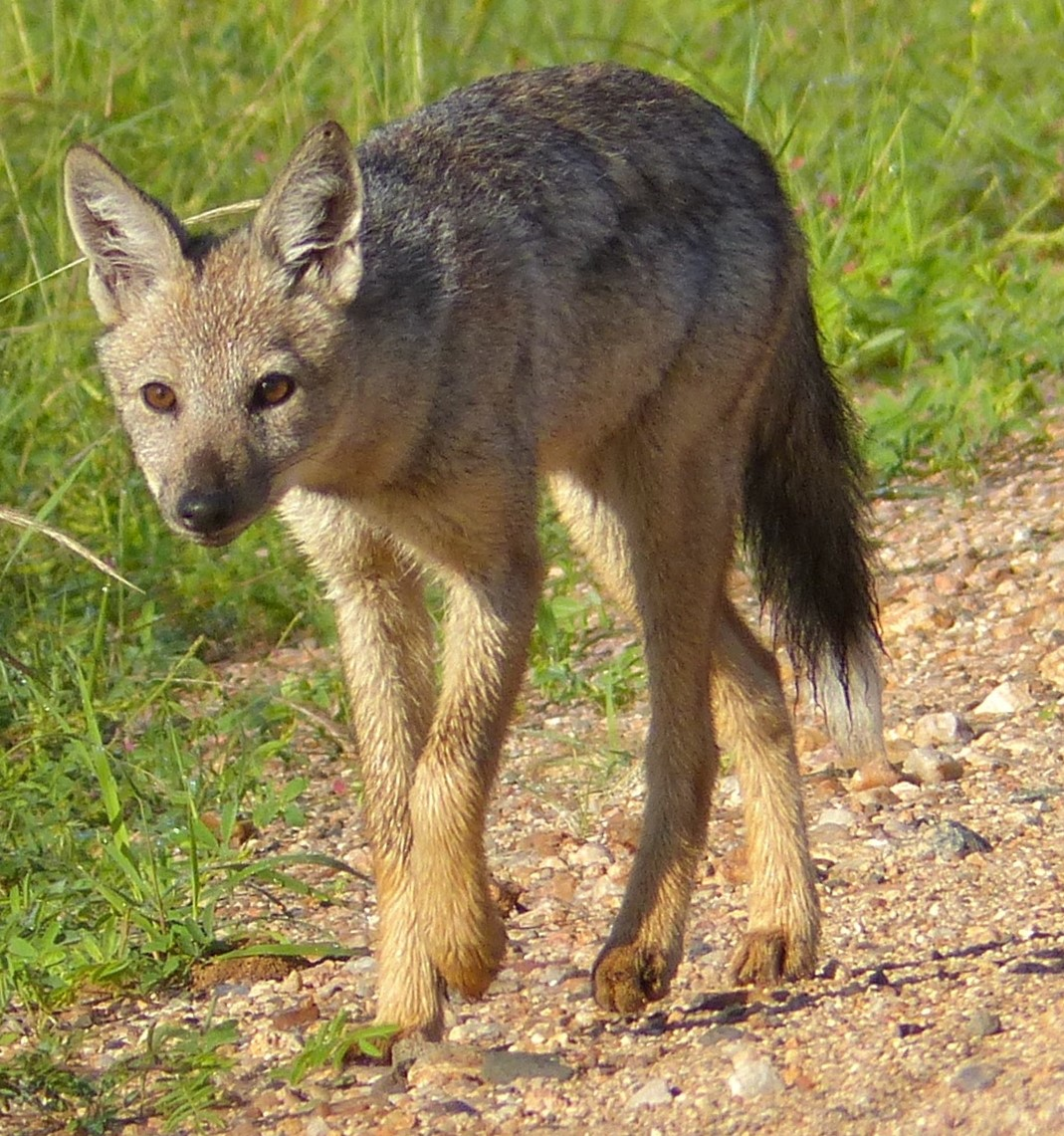
Side-striped jackal in Kruger National Park, South Africa.

There are two main varying versions regarding the creation of the first animals (non-humans). In both versions, the jackal is believed to be the first animal on Earth, and in accordance with the prevailing Serer view. Though there are differences in the interpretation, they converge on certain points in the wider understanding of the jackal's significance in Serer mythology. In one aspect, the jackal can be viewed as an Earth-diver sent to Earth by Roog, in another, as a fallen prophet for disobeying the laws of the divine. In one narrative, the myth does not mention it by name, but only allude to it or when it does, the negative connotations are made obscure, because of its former closeness to the divine before it was disgraced for disobeying the laws of Roog from whose womb it grew out of.

The creation of the original animals comes from the myth of Ɓoxo-koƥ (var: "o ɓoox o koƥ" or "boxo-kob") which translates to: the dog of the forest (the jackal).

In the first narrative, the creation was marked by the emergence of the acacia and the jackal. The following narrative provide further information on the behaviour of the jackal though obsecurely:

"The [jackal], was the first on Earth.
And it will be the last.
Roog sent his messenger to Earth.
To which it will bring all mankind.
The messenger went around the Earth.
It came back saying":
"Nothing is there.
Only the [jackal] remains."

The narrative provides a second indication of the behavior of the jackal during the crisis of the first creatures created by Roog. As one of the first animals on Earth that sprang out of first divine placenta, it desicicated the subsequent placenta from which the next phase of Roog's creation where to sprang out of. The text is deliberately obscure. Respect for the supreme being and all the entities incurred in the genesis of the Universe is key in Serer religion and tradition as well as the jackal myth which was close to Roog before being transformed into the dog of the forest (or pale fox according to some). This is why it is not named, but only by allusion. The jackal was the first intelligent creature on earth, before the arrival of humans. It is believed that will still remain on earth after human beings have returned to the divine. The Serers believe that, not only does it know in advance who will die, but it traces the tracks in advance of those who will go to funerals. The movements of the jackal are carefully observed, because the animal is viewed as a seer who came from the transcendence and maintains links with it. Although believed to be rejected in the bush by other animals and deprived of its original intelligence, it is still respected because it dared to resist the supreme being who still keeps it alive.

Issa Laye Thiaw's "myth de la creation de sereers" provides a further account on the jackal. In this myth, it is named and damned but the narrative is still obscure:

According to the legend of Ɓoxo-koƥ (dog of the forest or "wild dog" (figuritively) - jackal), the jackal was the first living thing created by the supreme deity Roog. The jackal circled the world in a day and two of its hands were transformed into paws. The supreme being gave it the ngud tree (guiera senegalensis) and thus ngud became the first tree and the second thing created by Roog. After the creation of ngud, the nalafun tree (combretum paniculatum) was created to whom the deity told: "Go and keep the ngud tree company, it is lonely". During the life cycle of the nalafun, the tree grow so tall that it headed towards the sky. The supreme being considered that an affront and gave it a sharp flick on the head (mak in Serer) and told it: "You are rude. Go! Turn around and go back to where you've just came from". After that event, the nalafun never grew tall as it once did and was always bent.

"The smallest animals were those who resisted Roog."

Another narrative indicates that, all animals (non-humans) were created by some form of world parent, except the jackal. In this myth, Roog went through a period of gestation. By thought, Roog planned this new creation, the animal world. By the mythical words, Roog realized the divine placenta and the internal gestation of the animal embryo called Mbocor. Roog then placed in the embryo of this animal, which was the largest of the creation, which included the eggs or seeds of all animals to come, including their organisms and reproductive energies. After the gestation period, Roog projected the embryo of the Mbocor on Earth, which carried all the animals species on Earth. The embryo of Mbocor acclimatized to the earth, feeding on grass and water. It grew rapidly reaching a considerable proportion, as it carried within it the germs of animal life. At the final stages of the gestation of the eggs and embryos that were within it, the animal ripped apart and released all the species within it. The female animals were created first, some spreading on land, in water, the mythical sea, etc. After delivering these animals, the Mbocor died, but animal life which came from the creator deity, spread through the world.

Although Mbocor was sacrificed in order to bring animal life on Earth, the narrative is imprecise on the identity of this animal. Some postulates that it was probably the largest animal in Africa, perhaps a pachyderm such as: hippopotamus, rhinoceros, elephant, etc. The word Mbocor means "The Mother" (or "Mother" in old Serer) − mother of all animals except the jackal. It is also probable that Mbocor is the same as Ɓoxo-koƥ (the dog of the forest − "jackal"). However, at present, nobody knows what kind of animal Mbocor was. In any case, the Ɓoxo-koƥ (i.e. the jackal) is believed by most Serers who adhere to the tenets of Serer religion to be the first living thing that the deity Roog (or Koox) put on Earth

==== The tree and the serpent ====
The serpent is linked to Serer cosmology and mythology. The serpent itself is the symbol of the Pangool (ancient Serer saints or ancestral spirits). Fangool, the singular of Pangool means serpent in Serer language. The Yaal Pangool are the masters of the cult. In Serer mythology, there is a relationship between trees and the serpent. In the Serer religion, the reincarnation of souls is a strongly held belief. When the dead leave the world of the living, their souls or "double" transforms into an animal, usually a snake, hence why it is taboo in Serer culture to kill snakes. The Serer religion posits that, the souls of the dead must make their way to Jaaniiw (the abode of good souls). The transformation into snakes (usually a black snake) is one of the first phases of their effort to reach Jaaniiw. As they transform themselves into snakes, they hide in trees. A snake hiding in a tree has two main symbolic meanings. It can either mean that a person has died and his soul has reincarnated (Ciiɗ in Serer language) or a person may die. If the latter is the case, then killing a snake would trigger their early death.

The ngaan mbul tree (celtis integrifolia) or a mboy xa nafad in particular, holds great significance in this reincarnation process. This tree supports the dual serpent-man, beneath which is a big hole where the undead take residence.

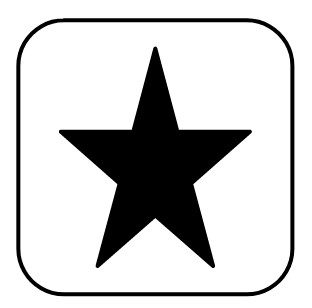
Yoonir, symbol of the Universe in Serer cosmology, commonly known as the Sirius star.

Like the serpent and other animals, the cayman and the manatee also holds significance in Serer mythology. The cayman is the guardian of the secrets of the past whilst the manatee holds the secrets of the future.

==== Origin of the stars (Serer numbers) ====
The Serer account regarding origins of the stars is found in Serer cosmology, especially the Star of "Yoonir" (in Serer and Cangin) more commonly known as the Star of Sirius, Serer-numbers and symbolism. Yoonir (Sirius) is the Serer representation of the Universe and the transcendence. Its five branches symbolize humans on Earth, standing up with their heads held high, their hands raised, which symbolizes work and prayer. The star is spread across the heavens and on Earth figuratively, symbolizing the sign of the supreme deity (Roog or Koox) and the image of man. In Serer-numbers, three important numbers came into play at the time of the initial creation: number 3, number 4 and number 7. Number 3 represents the feminine world as well as the divine; number 4 represents the masculine world as well as humans, and number 7 represents the divine in human beings, which is the perfect number and represents balance or harmony. Number 3 evokes the celestial world and is represented by a circle. As in the Serer home, the twelve rods arranged in a circle around the stele of Roog symbolizes the space enveloped by the powers of the divine. Number 3 is thus the symbolic number of Roog whilst number 4 evokes the human and terrestrial world (the visible world). This Earthly world is represented by two crossed lines facing the four cardinal points. In addition to Serer culture, it is for this religious reason why Serer women are allowed to participate in all religious, political and royal institutions, because they share the same number with the divine who created the Universe through its feminine principle. For the Serer men, their number is 4. Fixed to the four cardinal points of the Earth, they were the "Masters of the Earth" (the Lamanic class).

The origins of the stars offers a somewhat contradictory account, and is linked to a pact between the ostrich and the divine. According to the myth, the ostrich stood on a sandy valley looking around the wooded savannah that stretched around her. Feeling that the time had come to perform the immemorial gesture of its kind, it was immobilized due to the threats posed to its offspring. Each time it had managed to hide its eggs from other animals but on this occasion, a deer was determined to have its offspring. Feeling powerless against the beast before her, the ostrich asked for Roog's protection and the supreme deity intervened by creating the stars, which inspired her to take her first stroke. Inspired by the powers of the deity, the ostrich drew five trails on the ground representing the stars of the heavens. The ostrich then invaded this space and deposited her eggs inside the star, covering them with sand. After that act, it cited the following prayer, placing herself and her offspring under the protection of the divine:

In Serer

"Xu xabatna, ba mup!

Xu retna, ba gar!

Xu garna, ba ret!

Xu nutna ba ga!

Xu ga'na, ba nut!

Adna, kitim kiris!

Mending meles!

Wegoram a nun a Roog,

Wagerna Roog, ba waag na mi tig!"

In English

"Who opens his mouth will close it again!

Who closes his mouth will open it more!

Who comes, he will not return!

Who goes, he will return again!

Who closes his eyes, that means more!

Who sees, his eyes will be closed forever!

Earth! Engulfed them in the dark!

Without issue and without remission!

I enclose you, in the name of Roog!

They are powerless against Roog!

Nothing can be against me!"

The other animals were unable to act against the offspring of the ostrich enclosed by the star thanks to Roog, who offered them total protection. Powerful predators also came to devour the eggs but they could not cross the lines engraved on the sand. The myth went on to say that a black shepherd witnessed the hatching eggs. After the departure of the ostrich with her offspring, he came to the scene and discovered the star engraved on the spot where the eggs hatched. He understood that the star protected the eggs of the ostrich with the assistance of the supreme deity. It is for this reason Serer mums evoke the ostrich in their prayers for the protection of their children on their departure to another country.

Apart from evoking the ostrich, the myth plays a significant role in the adoption of the new religious symbol (the star) and its transmission to humankind. It is above all "the beginning of the eggs" of the ostrich. The Star Yoonir is a religious symbol in the Serer religion. Its five branches are marked and observed in the classical Ndut teachings. It is a Serer star and the symbol of the Serer people of Sine. It has religious, medicinal and nationalistic connotations among the Serers.

===== The Sun (Gulooxar) =====
Guloxaar is a psalm devoted to the Sun-god as the ancestors of the Serer people used to worship the Sun – many still do (see also Serer ancient history). The word Guloxaar in simple Serer means the Sun. In a religious sense, it means "one who is bound to come". The Sun itself being a star, it is attached to the Serer creation myth. The oldest and most secret prayer is devoted to the Sun (excerpt):

Verse 1

In Serer

Wataa dun!
Mudaa dun!
Dun a jof!

In English

You rise in the light!
You set in the light!
In your light, everything is right!

Verse 2

In Serer

Gulooxar! Gulooxar!
Tu! Dunare! Dunare!
We dun!
Mee dun!
Kuu waagoonga gullin,
Fat a waag na mi tig!
Ndaa kuu Waageeroonga gulin
Baa waag na mi tig!

In English (verse 2)

You! Who is never late!
You! Illuminate, illuminate!
Thou, light! Me in your light!
That which can delay thee, take power over me!
But what can not delay thee,
has no power over me!

These secret prayers are only revealed to young Serers on their journey to another country. It is only recited in the morning and at night, at sunrise and sunset. The second verse is a prayer of adoration. Beyond the star is the master of the Solar System who is evoked. The supreme being is represented by the Sun. The Sun's bright light is just the epiphany of its being. The prayer has mystical connotations.

==== First rain (Ngam) ====
The myth of Ngam ("Ngam jam, o yas jam") narrates the first time rain (the essence of life) appeared on planet earth. This narrative describes the event in a chaotic manner. According to this myth, the first event was the opening of the heavens by Roog. When the heavens were opened, the sky threatened with heavy and shadowy clouds. Tornado occurring in a straight line, swept through everything in its path, bearing thunder in the clouds. Bright lightning rendered the darkness, and the waters of the heavens first littered by the wind, splashed in every direction, before turning into regular, refreshing and nourishing showers.

The proverb Ngam jam, o yas jam (rain in peace! Sow in peace) is the first word Serer farmers utter during the first rain. It is also the way the Serers wish each other happy New Year. As well as an expression, it also a religious prayer. The first rain of the season is a pact between the transcendent power and humanity. It is a sign of life which continues to be transmitted by this tutelary power, which has long respected the pact. Custom dictates that, the first three steps on the damp earth of the first rain to be made barefooted in order to connect with mother nature. The father or the mother of the family would be given a calabash of the water of the first rain, for the whole family to drink. This water is holy and is viewed as sacred which would protect them from all misfortunes that may occur during the rainy season. Under the Saas tree, containers were placed under it to collect the water that touches the tree. This water was used for bathing as a sign of protection.

==== Creation of human beings ====
===== First human couple =====
Before humans existed, there were three stages in the creation of the Universe and each of these steps followed a consistent order. The first phase was the first three elements: air, earth and water. The mythical words of Roog found in A nax, led to the formation of the heavens, earth and the sea. The second phase of the creation was the primordial trees (i.e. Somb, Nqaul, Nquƭ, etc.,). The third phase was the creation of the animal world: the jackal and "Mbocor" (which means "The Mother") - mother of all animals except the jackal. In each of these phases, and before the creation of the first human couple, the supreme deity did not directly create each species, but only the primogenitors who then went on to populate the world with all the species of plant and animal life. The same was the case at the creation of the first humans. By thought, the supreme deity planned for the creation of human beings (a female and a male). By words, Roog went through a gestation phase which signalled the gestation of man and woman, paired within the divine placenta. Through its maternal nature, Roog projected a female and male human being as in childbirth. The first human was a female, named YAAB. The second human was a male named YOP (var: YOB).

YAAB and YOP (also known as Maak and Ndeb respectively, abbreviations of "Maakaan and Ndebaan" meaning 'the elder' and 'the younger' - respectively, or Ngooir Maak and Ngooir Ndeb) were the first humans that walked the Earth according to the narrative. The ancient and sacred village of Yaabo-Yabo (var: Yaboyabo or YABO-YABO, in present-day Senegal) also derives its name from this couple.

===== Ark of Yaabo-Yabo =====
The ark of Yaabo-Yabo is believed to be an ancient relic. It is said that the first humans on Earth (YAAB and YOP - female and male respective) boarded this ark when they left the Empyrean Heaven after their creation by the supreme deity (Roog). This relic is believed to be under the guardianship of Yaabo-Yabo, one of the sacred villages in Serer religion. It is one of the sacred Serer relics which holds great religious significance.

The relic is believed to exist to the present which is well respected. Most Serer houses have in their possession ancient relics from the past including furniture which are jealousy guarded. Some are religious while others are secular. The ark of Yaabo-Yabo is in wood, believed to be made from the Somb tree. In the Serer pre-colonial Kingdom of Sine, it is called MAAK (var: Maak), except in Diohine (a former territory of Sine in Serer country) where it is called Badir. Guarded by the elders, it is shaped like a bench. It is believed that, when YAAB and YOP were born to Roog in its Empyrean Heaven, they were deposited in an ark and carried down to Earth. YAAB was the first to arrive as she was the first born then followed by YOP. When they arrived on Earth, the original twins made contact with Mother Earth who would nourish them.

===== Historical figures =====
The legend of Unan and Ngoor probably dates back to the Iron Age, with Unan being the woman and Ngoor the man. Although not the first human couple that the supreme deity Roog (or Koox) had created, like the legend of Jambooñ and Agaire (see the Point of Sangomar), they form a fundamental part of Serer mythology. The legend agrees pretty much with the general consensus that a female was created first then a male. But in this narrative, it attempts to place Unan and Ngoor as the first human couple.

"The first human being created by Roog was a woman.
She lived naked, where Roog had placed her.
She slept on the ground at night,
bitten by the fleas of the earth.
She could not sleep.
Roog moved her to another place.
At that time, she was alone.
A man finds her and asks: "What do you eat? From the earth?
What do you drink? Water?"
The woman responded: "I do not know what I eat :because I'm not hungry.
I do not have water to drink."
He asks her name. She say: "Unan."
She leaves him to live elsewhere.
The man followed her for several years [winter years].
She gave the name Ngoor to the man,
for the man is he who comes to the woman for company.
A blacksmith found Unan and Ngoor.
He said to them: "I can make iron, so you can work" [the earth].
They forged a hoe and a machete.
The Pangool came and spoiled the work.
The blacksmith made them protective talismans"

The talismans were to protect them from the supernatural being that had entered their realm.

The name Unan means one who pile millet, figuratively, "the norisher". Ngoor (or Ngor) is a name for a virile man. These names denote the function of the woman and the man but they are not their real names. The narrative evokes the first humans created by Roog with a female being the first, and the trials they had faced. It also evokes the name of Roog, regarded as the Omnipotence, whom through his paternal nature, acted as a good father and moved the woman to a more comfortable place when she complained about her discomfort. It shows that he is always available to his children. The appearance of the man initially surprised the woman, whom she named Ngoor (virile), yet, they later became companions and procreated.

==== Crisis and reorganization of the Universe ====
===== Crisis =====
Originally, all the animals on Earth lived together with human beings and trees in harmony. However, this peaceful habitation of the Earth came to an abrupt end when one of the lions impregnated a girl causing her to give birth to a monkey, a half man-half beast. The male society of this distant past were furious and summoned all the animals to a hearing in order to determine the culprit. The lion fearing for the punishment that it may receive from these men, refused to identify itself as the one responsible for the act until a dog pointed it out as the culprit. A war broke out between the human population, the non-human animals and the trees. The humans were victorious and drove the animals in the bush except the dog who became man's companion. However, the crisis did not end there, as this narrative from A leep shows:

"A conflict broke out between all beings.
Trees, animals and men were killing each other.
Roog intervened and punished them all.
He reduced the size of men, who were originally giants.
He paralyzed and rendered the trees dumb and blind.
But he did not render them deaf.
That is why the trees no longer see, no longer move, no longer speak, but they hear.
Roog rendered the animals mad.
The smallest resisted Roog.
But man's spirit was the cleverest.
Through his spirit, he dominated all these beings."

The narrative reflects human hostility towards animals especially the lion, "the savage beast". The original cause of the war also identifies the monkey, whose predecessors in that ancient past is believed to be closer to humans, like all animals and plant, from the same divine placenta."

It also represents a microcosm of the slaughtering of animals by humans, accompanied by their dogs in their hunting camps subsequent to the initial creation. Not only did men hunted animals, but trees cut down those closest to them and animals killed each other, as found in the myth of the hyena and the talking tree. This disorder led to Roog's direct intervention and its reorganisation of the Universe which the narrative says would have repercussions for Planet Earth.

===== Roog's reorganisation of the Universe =====
After the initial crisis on Planet Earth where humans, animals and plants fought against each other, Roog intervened and punished them all. The tradition states that, Roog was the father and mother of its creation who initially afforded some freedom to its first creation. However, after the first disorder, Roog organised the world on new foundations. That reorganisation was not a second creation but it would have profound effects on the Universe and particularly on Earth. Roog manifested its powers and will continue to manifest it. Serer phrases such as "Roog alone is king" and "We all come from the hand of Roog" are examples of conscience decision of divine intervention in the events of life, as in the destiny of nations and human kind. Roog will be present in the activities of humans and the cosmos. Though the trees were the hardest hit by their immobility, trees were afforded special status, such as the tree of life, ability to heal, homes to certain spiritual entities and ability to hear humans beings even the Pangool. They are the object of respect in Serer society. Deforestation in Serer country is almost unheard of.

Animals were also severely affected by Roog's judgement. Although rendered wild and "mad", they still retain their instinct, though their relations with humans would be changed forever. Some became human pets others retained their freedom away from human habitation. Despite this separation, animals are respected and would form part of Serer totemism.

Humans were the least affected. The only thing they have lost was their original size and duration of life. Along with being giants, the first humans were believed to have had larger eyes and bigger bones than the present. Roog did not touch the human spirit. Instead, it allowed them to develop their minds and put their own branding on Earth.

==== Representation of the Universe ====
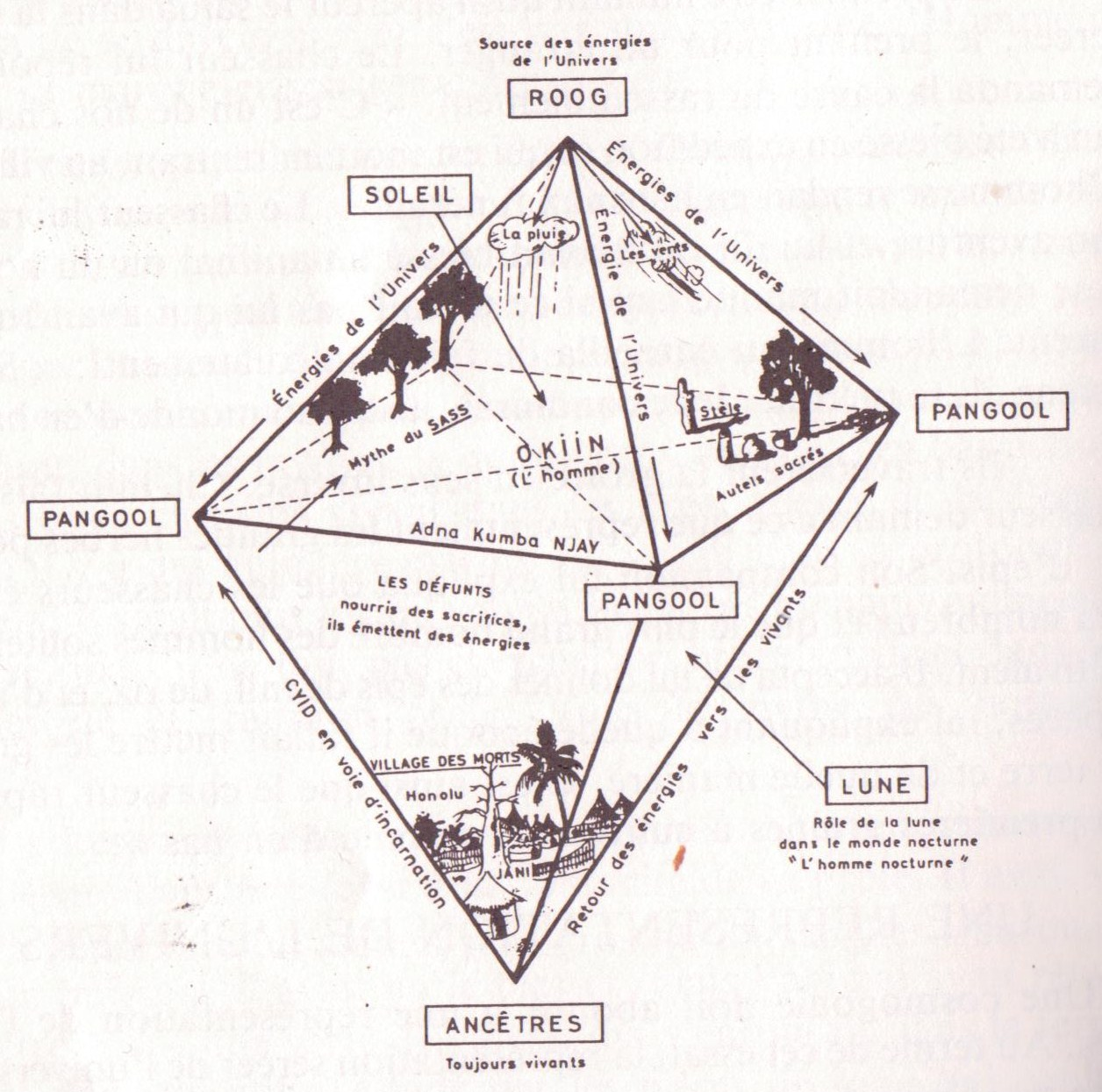
Serer cosmogonical representation of the Universe. The three worlds: the invisible world, the terrestrial world and the nocturnal world. (Henry Gravrand, La civilisation sereer Pangool (1990).

In Serer cosmogony, the Universe is represented schematically. There were three worlds: the invisible world from above; the diurnal terrestrial world and the nocturnal world. A geometric representation of these three worlds form the Serer star. The invisible world from above is the source of energies and life. The diurnal Earthly world (e.g. the sun) is divided into two strands: the Saas tree symbolizing the tree of life and human beings assisted by the nocturnal world (the Pangool). The nocturnal world depicts the role of the moon, the Pangool (ancient Serer saints and ancestral spirits), Ciid (proper, var: Ciiƭ or Cyid, the disembodied souls in search of re-hominisation or reincarnation) and "Jaaniiw" or "Honolu" (the sacred abode of the departed souls). After a sacrifice of domestic animals and/or offering of millet to the Pangool and ancestors, vital energies are returned.

===== The invisible world from above =====
The invisible world represents the vital energies which originates from the transcendent powers of Roog, which spreads worldwide. The supreme being is the source of all life in the cosmos as well as human beings. In the world of Roog, certain entities and elevated humans are afforded sacredness and called upon to live with Roog. They form the demi-gods, saints and ancestral spirits (Pangool), etc.

===== The diurnal terrestrial world =====
The diurnal terrestrial world is represented around a network of topical or utopian transcendence. Topically, it is centred around the sacred, people or accessible places. Utopianly, it resides in the imagination. There are two types of people on Earth: visible human beings and the invisible, living far away from human beings with their own paths and dwelling place. These invisible people, reside in the souterrain world.

===== The nocturnal world (Jaaniiw) =====
Jaaniiw is the abode where the souls of the dead go. Their star is not the sun (the star which illuminates the diurnal world), but the moon which illuminates the activities of the night and beings of the night. Flying from Jaaniiw to Ciid, their aim is to return to earth for a new course of human evolution.

"As today a Moslem Head of state will consult the "sacred wood", and offer in sacrifice an ox or a bull, I have seen a Christian woman, a practicing medical doctor, consult the sereer "Pangol" [the snakes of the sacred wood]. In truth, everywhere in Black Africa, the "revealed religions" are rooted in the animism which still inspires poets and artists, I am well placed to know it and to say it [...]"

— Léopold Sédar Senghor

== Influence in Senegambian culture ==
Just as the Serer religion has influenced the religious beliefs of Senegambia, Serer mythology has also influenced Senegambian culture. Some of the most revered art in Senegambia, particularly in Senegal where the Serers make up the third largest ethnic group are based on Serer mythology, legends and culture. Some of these include the works of Safi Faye (i.e. Mossane and Kaddu Beykat), works of first president of Senegal the late Léopold Sédar Senghor ("Chants pour Signare", a poem inspired by the legend of Jambooñ and Agaire at the Point of Sangomar, "Chants d'ombre" and "Aux tirailleurs Sénégalais morts pour la France"). The Sangomar legend also inspired president Senghor to name the Senegalese presidential plane purchased in 1978 after Sangomar. Other works influenced by Serer mythology, legend and culture include: Fama Diagne Sène's "Mbilem ou le baobab du lion" (a controversial play which alienated the Serer priestly class - the Saltigues), Yandé Codou, la griotte de Senghor by Yandé Codou Sène, Papa Amadou Fall and Cheikhou Coulibaly's Yatal Gueew (widening the circle) for the 2001 Senegalese election campaign, the mbalax which originated from the Serer njuup tradition, popularised by Youssou N'Dour and other Senegalese artists (see Ndut initiation rite), etc. From a global perspective, they include the work of Catherine Clément, Steve Cox and Ros Schwartz's - Theo's Odyssey.

== See also ==
- Faro (mythology) (Bambara)
- Mandé creation myth
- Nommo (Dogon)
- Ashanti mythology
- Dahomey mythology
- Yumboes (a Lebou fairytale)
- Traditional African religion
- List of creation myths

== Notes and references ==
=== Bibliography ===
- Kellog, Day Otis, and Smith, William Robertson, "The Encyclopædia Britannica: latest edition. A dictionary of arts, sciences and general literature", Volume 25, p. 64, Werner (1902)
- Kalis, Simone, "Médecine traditionnelle, religion et divination ches les Seereer Siin du Sénégal" –La connaissance de la nuit, L’Harmattan, 1997, pp. 48, 291, 293, 329, ISBN 2-7384-5196-9
- Universität Frankfurt am Main, Frobenius-Institut, Deutsche Gesellschaft für Kulturmorphologie, Frobenius Gesellschaft, "Paideuma: Mitteilungen zur Kulturkunde, Volumes 43-44", F. Steiner (1997), pp. 144–5, (Henry Gravrand, "La civilisation Sereer -Pangool" [in]) ISBN 3515028420
- Niangoran-Bouah, Georges, "L'univers Akan des poids à peser l'or : les poids dans la société", Les nouvelles éditions africaines - MLB, (1987), p. 25, ISBN 2723614034
- International African Institute, Environment Training Programme, "African environment, Volume 11, Issues 1-2", Environment Training Programme ( 2002), pp 104 & 117
- Faye, Louis Diène, "Mort et Naissance le monde Sereer", Les Nouvelles Editions Africaines (1983), pp. 9–10, 17–25, 44, ISBN 2-7236-0868-9
- Madiya, Clémentine Faïk-Nzuji, "Canadian Museum of Civilization", Canadian Centre for Folk Culture Studies, "International Centre for African Language, Literature and Tradition", (Louvain, Belgium), pp 27, 155, ISBN 0-660-15965-1
- Kesteloot, Lilyan, "Introduction aux religions d'Afrique noire", s.n., 2007, p. 50,
- Gravrand, Henry, "La Civilisation Sereer - Pangool", vol. 2. Les Nouvelles Editions Africaines du Senegal (1990), ISBN 2-7236-1055-1
- Gravrand, Henry, "La civilisation sereer, Cosaan : les origines", vol. 1, Nouvelles Editions africaines (1983), p 33, ISBN 2-7236-0877-8
- Gravrand, Henry, "Le Symbolisme sereer : Mythe du Saas et symboles", « Revue de Psycho-Pathologie » vol. 9 N^{o} 2 Dakar (1971) (Published and reviewed under the title "Le symbolisme serer" [in] Psychopath. Afric. 1973, IX, 2, 237−265 [in] Psychopathologie africaine) - (Link retrieved: 21 July 2012)
- Descamps, Cyr, "Contribution a la Préhistoire de l'Ouest-sénégalais, thèse, Paris, p 315. (inédit : p. 126)
- Burke, Andrew, & Else, David, "The Gambia & Senegal", 2nd edition - September 2002, Lonely Planet Publications Pty Ltd, p. 13
- Arbonnier, M., "Arbres, arbustes et lianes des zones sèches d'Afrique de l'Ouest", CIRAD, Montpellier (2000) ISBN 2-87614-431-X
- Rake, Alan, "New African yearbook", Volumes 1999−2000, Africa Book Centre Limited, 2000, p. 391, ISBN 0905268636
- Serer + (in English) "Serere-English / English-Serere Dictionary", Compiled by PCVs: Bethany Arnold (Khady Diouf), Chris Carpenter (Ndiouma Diome), Guy Pledger (Arfon Sarr), and Jack Brown (Babakar Ndiaye), p. 8, (May 2010), First Edition, Peace Corps - Senegal
- Diop, Cheikh Anta, "The African origin of civilization: myth or reality" L. Hill (1974), pp. 196–197, ISBN 1-55652-072-7
- Leonard, Scott A, & McClure, Michael, "Myth and knowing − an introduction to world mythology", McGraw-Hill (2004), pp 32, 63-172, ISBN 076741957X
- University of Calgary. Dept. of Archaeology, Society of Africanist Archaeologists in America, Society of Africanist Archaeologists, "Newsletter of African archaeology, Issues 47-50", Dept. of Archaeology, University of Calgary, 1997, pp. 27, 58
- Senghor, Léopold Sédar, « Chants pour Signare », in Nocturnes : poèmes, Éd. du Seuil, Paris, 1961
- Dupire, Marguerite, "Sagesse sereer: Essais sur la pensée sereer ndut", KARTHALA Editions (1994), p. 54, ISBN 2865374874
- "Éthiopiques, Issues 55-56." Fondation Léopold Sédar Senghor. Grande imprimerie africaine (1991), p. 97.
- Thiaw, Issa Laye "La femme Seereer." Sénégal, Sociétés africaines et diaspora. Edition L'Harmattan (2005), ISBN 2-7475-8907-2

=== Further reading ===
- Henry Gravrand, « La prière sérèer », Expérience et language religieux [in] "Religions africaines et christianisme", Colloque international de Kinshasa (1978), vol. 1, Kinshasa (1979), 106s. [in] Bénézet, "Introduction à la théologie africaine", p. 22 (Retrieved: 25 May 2012)
- Gravrand, Henry, "Le Symbolisme sereer : Mythe du Saas et symboles", « Revue de Psycho-Pathologie » vol. 9 N^{o} 2 Dakar (1971) (Published and reviewed under the title "Le symbolisme serer" [in] Psychopath. Afric. 1973, IX, 2, 237–265 [in] Psychopathologie africaine) - (Link retrieved: 21 July 2012)
- Ndiaye, Ousmane Sémou, "Diversité et unicité sérères : l’exemple de la région de Thiès", Éthiopiques, no. 54, vol. 7, 2e semestre 1991 (Retrieved: 10 May 2012)
- Thiaw, Issa laye, "Mythe de la création du monde selon les sages sereer", pp. 45–50, 59-61 [in] "Enracinement et Ouverture" – "Plaidoyer pour le dialogue interreligieux", Konrad Adenauer Stiftung (23 and 24 June 2009), Dakar (Retrieved: 25 May 2012)
- Thiaw, Issa Laye, "La Religiosite de Seereer, Avant et pendant leur Islamisation". Ethiopiques no: 54, Revue semestrielle de Culture Négro-Africaine, Nouvelle série, volume 7, 2e Semestre (1991) (Retrieved: 25 May 2012))
- Lericollais, André, « La gestion du paysage ? Sahélisation, surexploitation et délaissement des terroirs sereer au Sénégal », Afrique de l'ouest, Dakar (21–26 November 1988), ORSTOM, . For the name of Serer medicinal plants and their corresponding Latin names, see Nqaul is spelt Ngaul (p. 8), Mbos (pp. 5 & 8), Somb (p. 8), Ngud (p. 8), Nalafun (p. 8), Ngol (p. 8), Saas is spelt Sas (pp. 5, 9), (Retrieved 3 June 2012)
- Faye, Amade, "La beaute Seereer : Du modele mythique au motif poetique", [in] Ethiopiques, n° 68, revue négro-aricaine de littérature et de philosophie (1er semestre 2002)
- Becker, Charles: "Vestiges historiques, trémoins matériels du passé clans les pays sereer", Dakar (1993), CNRS - ORS TO M. (Retrieved: 25 May 2012)
- "Prelude Medicinal Plant Database" [in] Metrafo (Retrieved: 3 June 2012)
- Potel, Anne-Marie, « Les plantes médicinales au Sénégal ». Study report of Anne-Marie Potel, accomplished at Nguekokh (Senegal), 2002. Registered in the chapter "Grey Littérature" of the PRELUDE data bank (in French) [in] Prelude Medicinal Plant Database (in English) (Retrieved: 3 June 2012)
- Senghor, Léopold Sédar, "Chants d'ombre" [in] "Selected poems of LEOPOLD SEDAR SENGHOR", CUP Archive, pp 103, 125 (Retrieved: 3 June 2012)
- Armes, Roy, "African Filmmaking: North And South of the Sahara", Indiana University Press (2006), p 80, ISBN 0253218985 (Retrieved: 25 May 2012)
- Senghor, Léopold Sédar, « Chants d'ombre » [in] Fraser, Robert, "West African Poetry: A Critical History", Cambridge University Press (1986), p. 51, ISBN 052131223X
- Senghor, Léopold Sédar, Préface: « Un Regard Neuf pour l’Afrique Noire »; [in] "A New Look at Black Africa"; [in] Alexandre, Pierre, "LES AFRICAINS" (1981); [in] Camara, Fatou Kiné (PhD) & Seck, Abdourahmane (PhD), "Secularity and Freedom of Religion in Senegal: Between a Constitutional Rock and a Hard Reality", pp. 2–3 (860 & 859), (11/26/2010)
- « MBILEM OU LE BAOBAB DU LION » de Fama Diagne Sène : Une confrontation entre la tradition et la modernité, [in] PiccMi.com (Retrieved: 10 May 2012)
- "Pape and Cheikh" biography [in] Womad.org "artists", by Andy Morgan (July 2003)
- Sy, Abdourahmane (28 February 2010). "Rémi Jegaan Dioh: Sur un air culturel et cultuel". Ferloo.
- Clément, Catherine, Cox, Steve & Schwartz, Ros, "Theo's Odyssey", Arcade Publishing (1999), p. 459, ISBN 1559704993 (Retrieved: 13 June 2012)
