= Faros (disambiguation) =

Faros is a Greek village on the island of Ikaria, Greece

It may also refer to:

- Faros del Panama, a skyscraper complex currently cancelled in Panama City, Panama
- Faros Acropoleos, a former football club in Akropoli, Nicosia, Cyprus
- Faros Keratsiniou B.C., a Greek basketball club in Keratsiniou, Piraeus, Greece
- Stari Grad, a town on the Croatian island of Hvar that was named Faros in antiquity

== See also ==
- Pharos (disambiguation)
- Faro (disambiguation)
