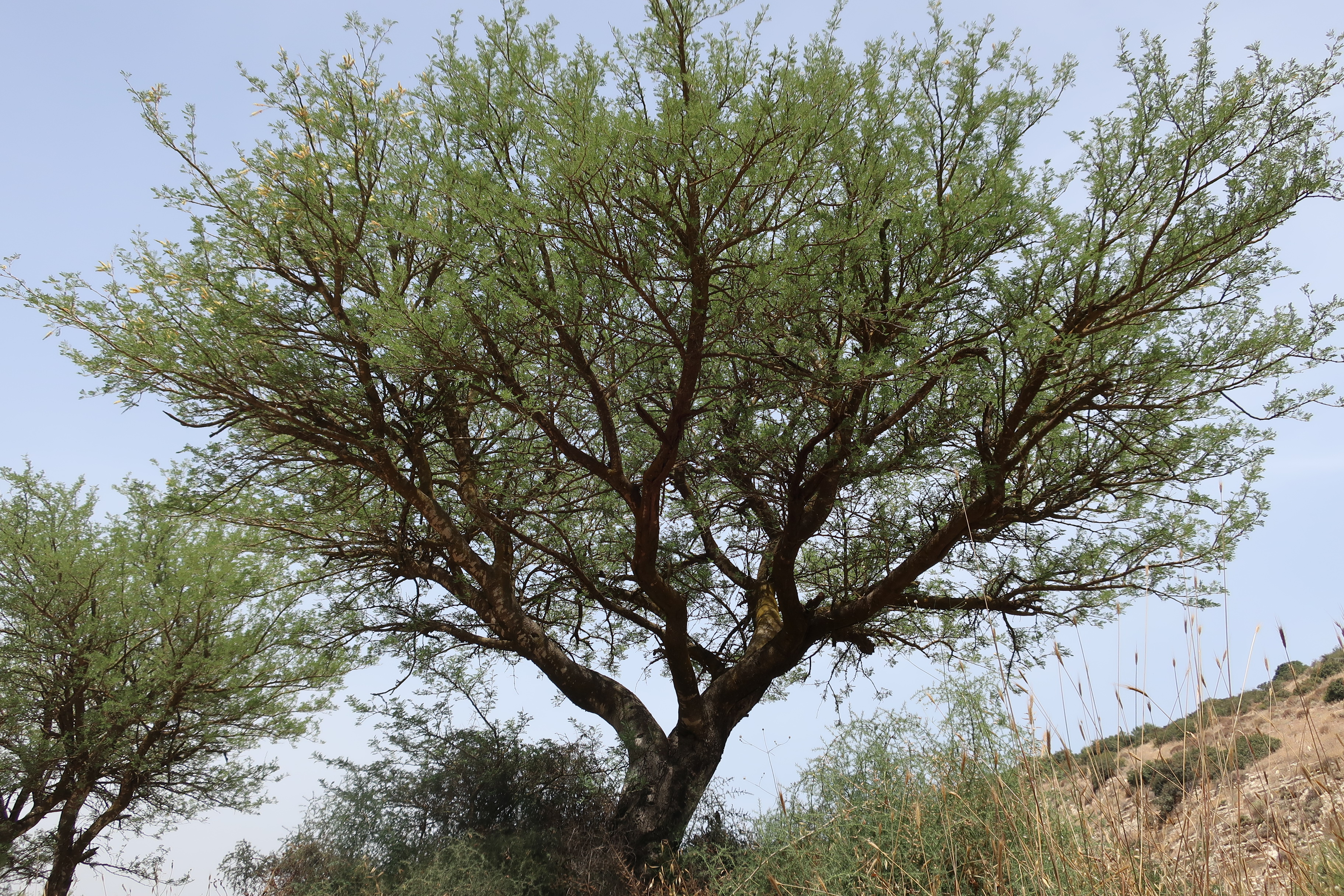
- F. albida in the Elah valley, Israel

Scientific classification
- Kingdom: Plantae
- Clade: Tracheophytes
- Clade: Angiosperms
- Clade: Eudicots
- Clade: Rosids
- Order: Fabales
- Family: Fabaceae
- Subfamily: Caesalpinioideae
- Clade: Mimosoid clade
- Genus: Faidherbia; A.Chev.
- Species: F. albida

Binomial name
- Faidherbia albida (Delile) A.Chev.
- range of F. albida

Synonyms
- Acacia albida Delile; Acacia mossambicensis Bolle; Faidherbia albida var. glabra Nongon.; Faidherbia albida var. pseudoglabra Nongon.

= Faidherbia =

Genus of plants

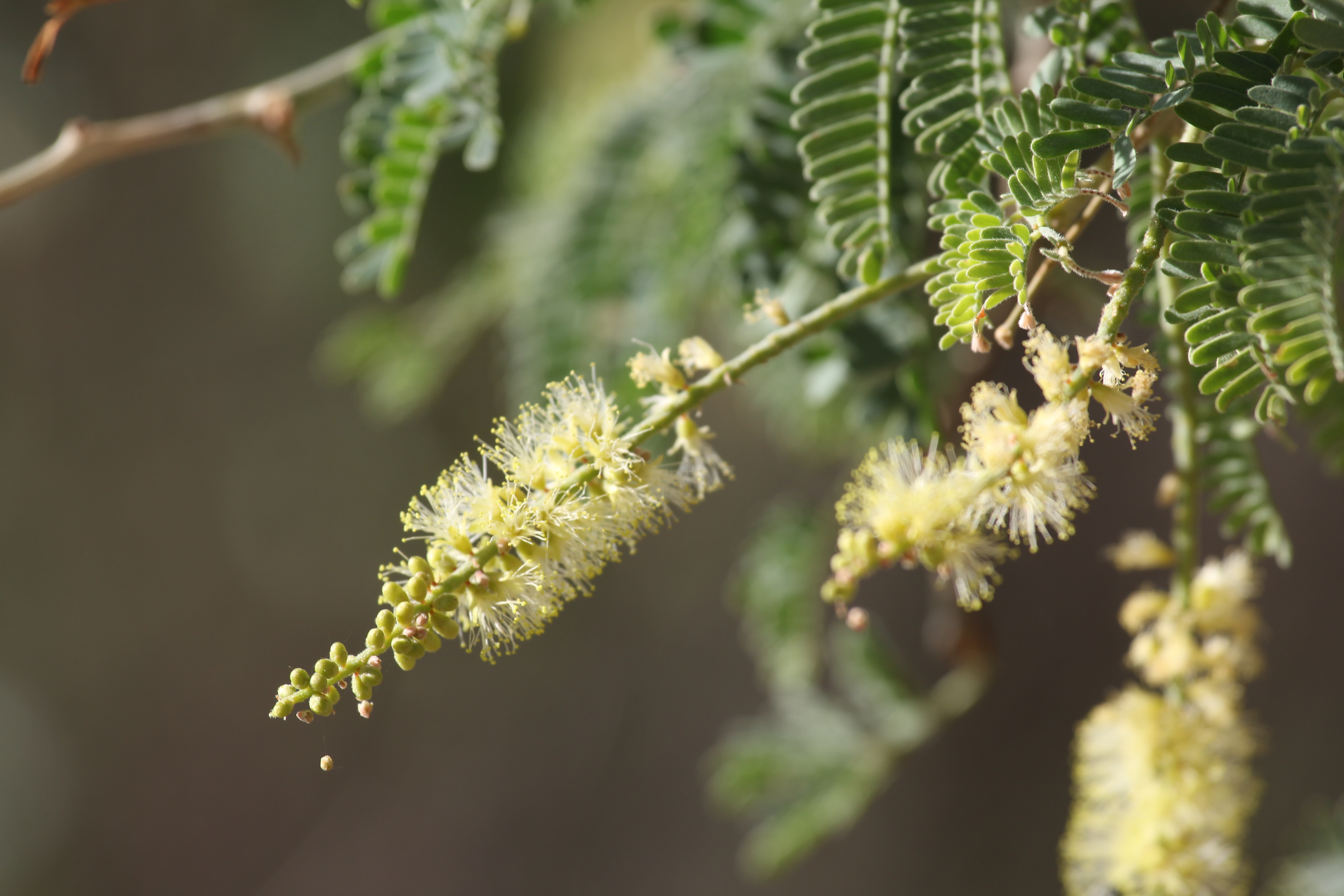

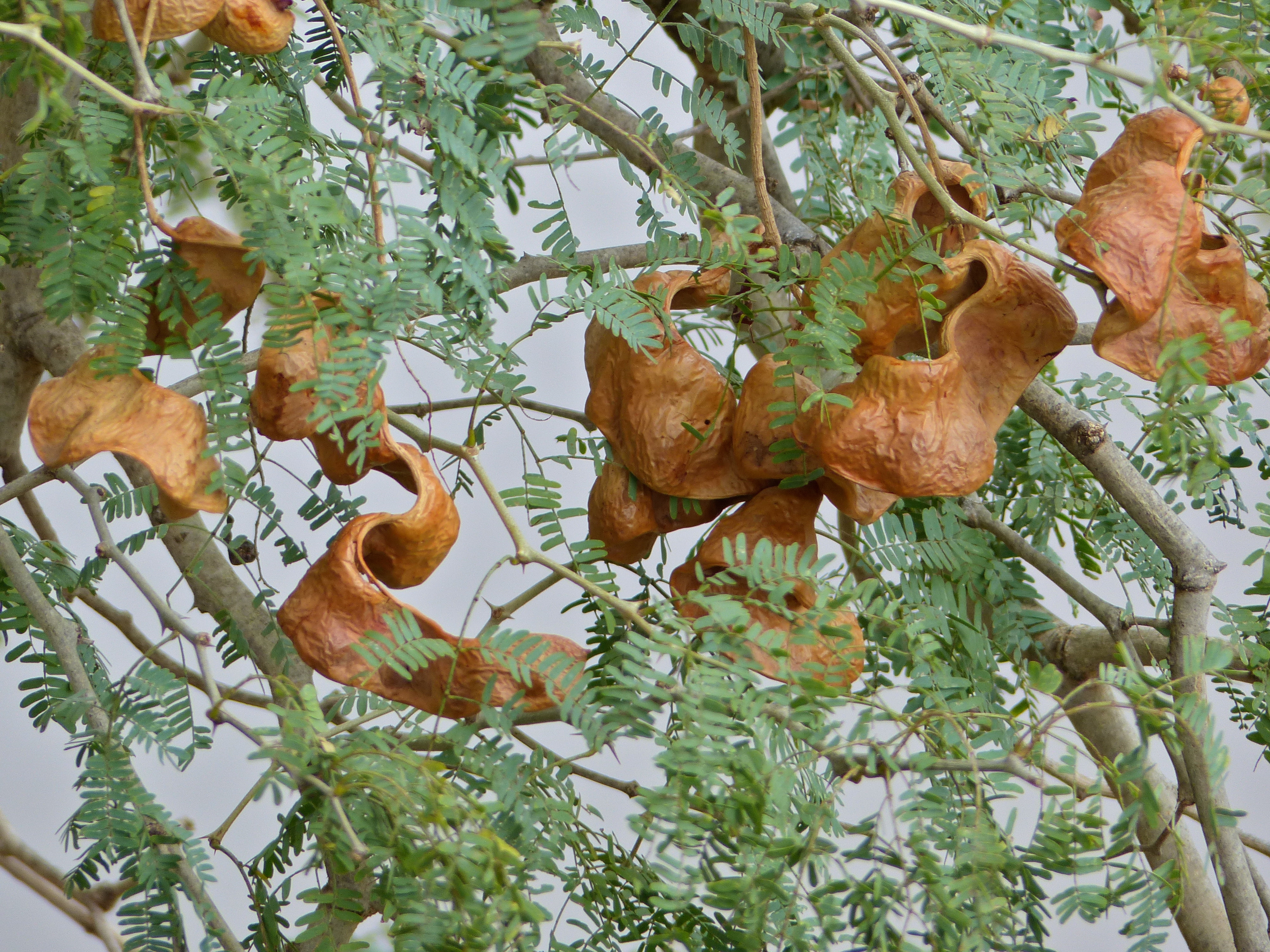
Inflorescences (MHNT) and dry seed pods, the latter resembling apple rings

Faidherbia is a genus of fabaceous plants containing one species, Faidherbia albida, which was formerly widely included in the genus Acacia as Acacia albida. The species is native to Africa and the Middle East and has also been introduced to Pakistan and India. Common names include apple-ring acacia (their circular, indehiscent seed pods resemble apple rings), white acacia, and winter thorn. The South African name is ana tree.

== Taxonomy ==
This species has been known as Acacia albida for a long time, and is often still known as such. Guinet (1969) in Pondicherry first proposed separating it into the genus Faidherbia, a genus erected during the previous century by Auguste Chevalier with this as the type species, seconded by the South African James Henderson Ross (1973) and the Senegalese legume botanist Nongonierma (1976, 1978), but authors continued to favour classification under Acacia as of 1997.

=== Infraspecific variability ===
According to John Patrick Micklethwait Brenan, as written in the Flora of Tropical East Africa (1959), two forms can be distinguished in this region (Kenya, Tanzania, Uganda). Race A is distinguished by generally smooth features, whereas race B is more hairy. Ross (1979) notes that all trees in the south of central Tanzania belong to race B. Similarly, Nongonierma described two variants for Senegal, var. glabra and var. pseudoglabra, but his distinction was disregarded taxonomically as of 2007.

== Description ==
Faidherbia is a thorny tree growing up to 6–30 m (20–98 ft) tall and up to 2 m (6 1/2 ft) in trunk diameter. Its deep-penetrating tap root makes it highly resistant to drought. The bark is grey, and fissured when old.

== Distribution ==
In Southern Africa, it is absent from most of the territory, avoiding dry, colder and upland areas or areas of winter rainfall, but it does occur in the eastern Caprivi Strip, the northern Okavango basin, the floodplains of the Linyanti, Zambezi and Limpopo rivers, as well as southwards to Gaborone. In Zimbabwe, the tree is absent from the highlands and central plateau, but it does occur in Gonarezhou and southwards to the Kruger Park and adjacent lowveld of western Gaza and southern Maputo provinces. It reaches its southern limit along the Pongola floodplain in Maputaland. In western Namibia, it is present in the Kaokoveld, Damaraland, and the Namib-Naukluft area.

In the rest of Africa, it is absent from deserts, areas of high rainfall, tropical rainforests and mountainous areas, but occurs throughout the eastern half of the continent from the southern coast in Maputaland to Egypt, throughout the Subsaharan Sahel and the Horn of Africa. In Northern Africa, besides in Egypt it also occurs in Algeria, it does not occur in Morocco proper, but is found in Western Sahara.

In Asia, it is thought to be native to Yemen and Saudi Arabia in the Arabian Peninsula, Iran, and in the Levant in Israel, Syria and Lebanon. In Israel, the tree is protected by law.

A population is found in relict groves in Israel (in the Shimron nature reserve, near the community settlement of Timrat, and in the western-most reaches of the Valley of Elah). All of the trees in a given grove are genetically identical and seem to have multiplied by vegetative reproduction only, for thousands of years.

Introduced populations are found in Cyprus, Pakistan, and India (Karnataka), as well as on Ascension Island.

== Ecology ==
In Southern Africa, it usually grows on alluvial floodplains in bushveld, on riverbanks or flood pans, in swamps, or in dry watercourses that can flood during rains. It grows in woodland in the Sahel, along the Zambezi, and in Sudan. In the Sahel, it grows gregariously in groves. It also grows in savannahs in Sudan and the Sahel, in heavy soils with good drainage.

In tropical eastern Africa, it sometimes occurs singly, but may often be the dominant species in dry woodlands. In the Sahel, it has an irregular, clumped distribution, absent in some areas, but occurring in others.

It grows in areas with 250–600 mm (10–23 1/2 in) of rain per year.

== Uses ==
Faidherbia albida is important in the Sahel for raising bees, since its flowers provide bee forage at the close of the rainy season, when most other local plants do not.

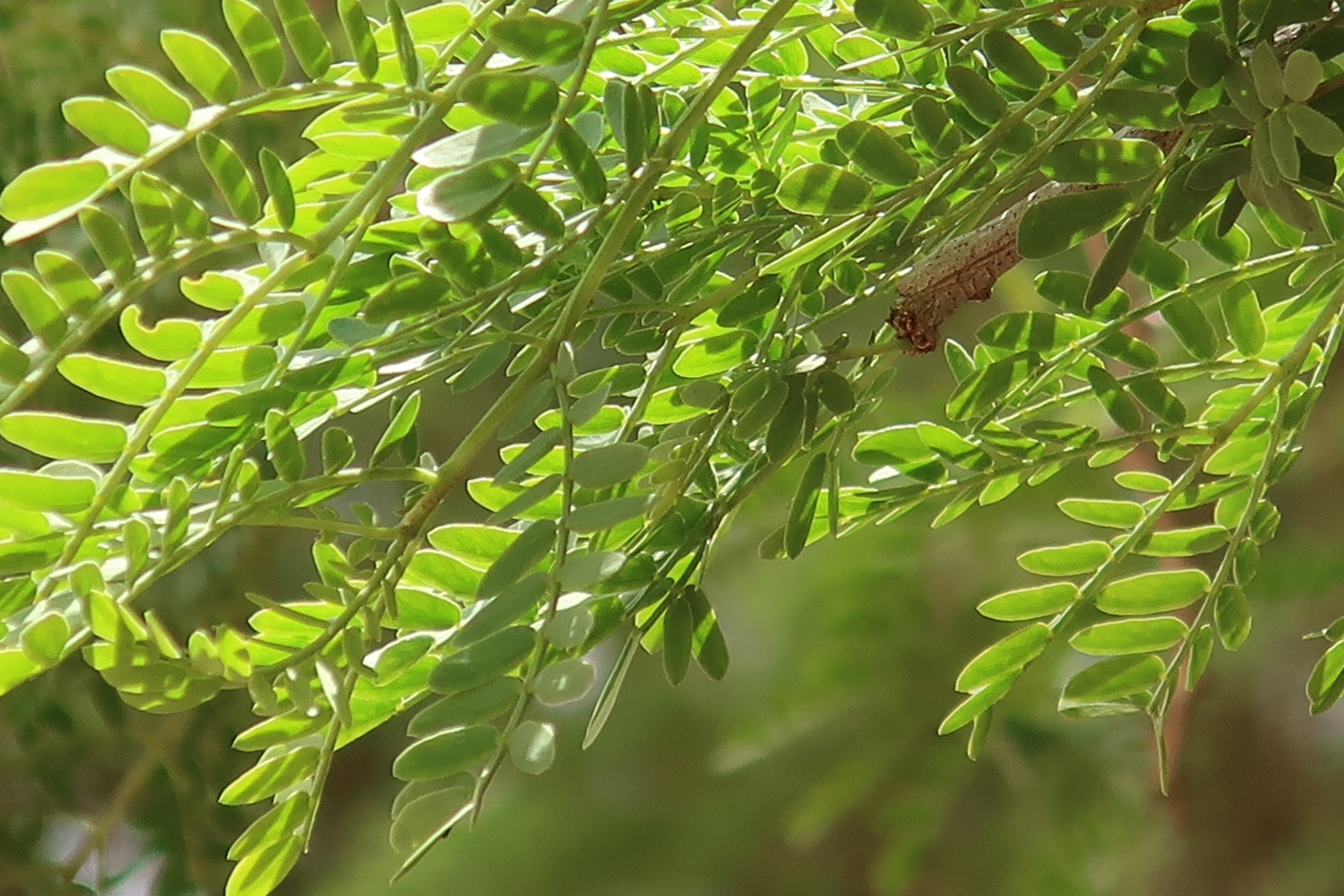
Foliage of Faidherbia albida in early summer

The seed pods are used for raising livestock, are used as camel fodder in Nigeria, and are eaten by stock and game in Southern Africa. They are relished by elephant, antelope, buffalo, baboons and various browsers and grazers, though strangely ignored by warthogs and zebras.

The wood is used for canoes, mortars and pestles, while the bark is pounded in Nigeria and used as a packing material on pack animals. The wood has a density of about 560 kg/m^{3} at a water content of 12%. The energy value of the wood as fuel is 19.741 kJ/kg.

Ashes of the wood are used in making soap and as a depilatory and tanning agent for hides. The wood is used for carving and the thorny branches useful for a natural barbed fence. Pods and foliage are highly regarded as livestock fodder. Some 90% of Senegalese farmers interviewed by Felker (1981) collected, stored, and rationed Acacia albida pods to livestock. Zimbabweans use the pods to sedate fish. Humans eat the boiled seeds in times of food scarcity in Zimbabwe.

It is valued in agroforestry as it fixes nitrogen, and a high yield has been achieved in at least one test plot of maize crops grown amongst the trees at a density of 100 to 25 tree per hectare. According to a 2018 article in The Guardian, monocultures of this species are popular in parts of Niger, where it is known as gao in Hausa, to use for intercropping.

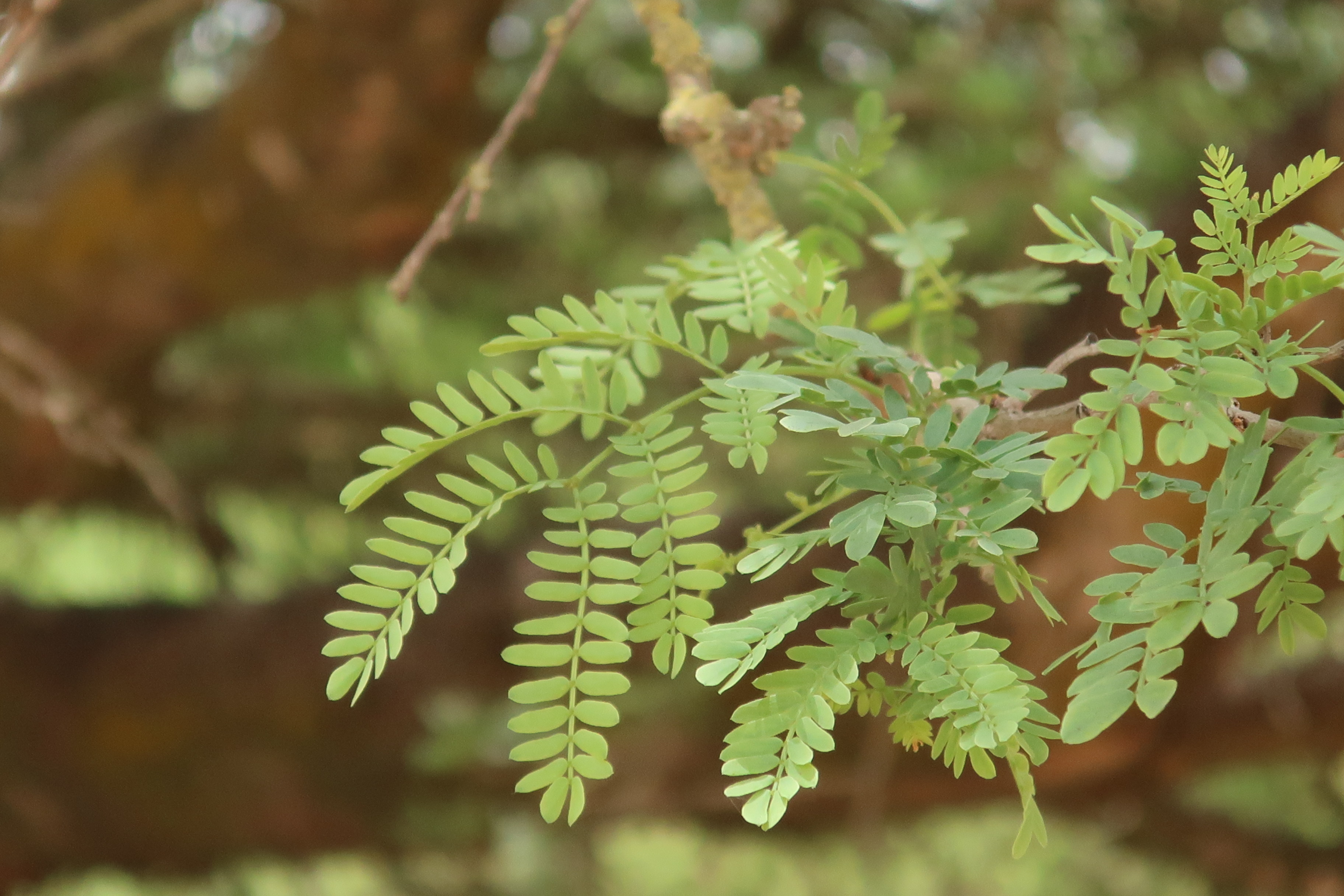
Green foliage of White Acacia (Faidherbia albida)

It is also used for erosion control. Its value as an agroforestry tree lies partially in the fact that the tree drops its leaves during the rainy season, and therefore does not compete with crops for sunlight. The trees' use in farmer-managed natural regeneration of degraded soils throughout southern Niger since the 1990s has been described by one writer as "the biggest positive environmental transformation in the Sahel, and possibly in Africa".

=== Medicinal uses ===
An extract is used to treat ocular infections in farm animals. The bark is used in traditional medicine in Southern Africa, and Niger.

== Cultural significance ==
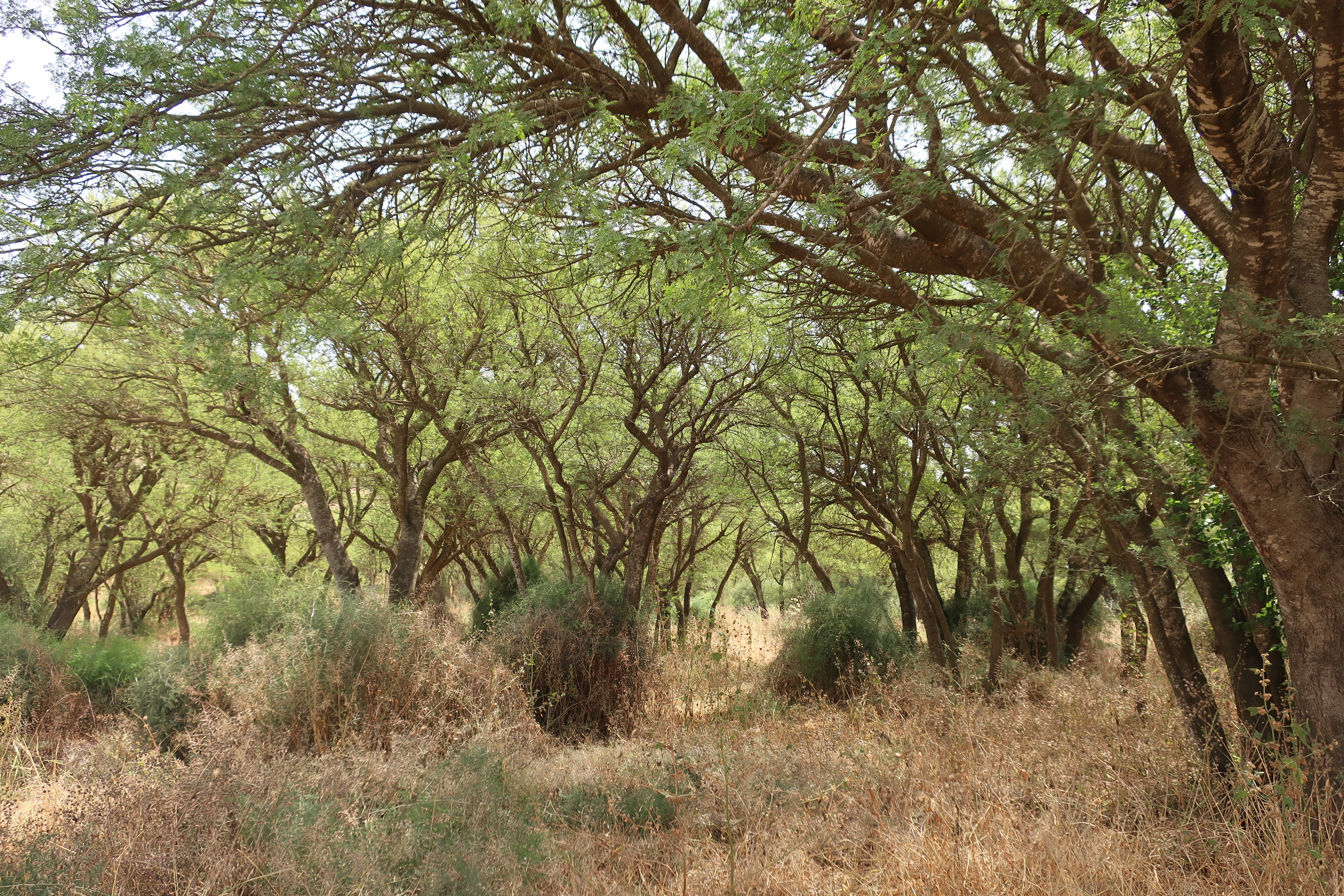
Stand of White acacia trees growing in a thicket

Faidherbia albida is known in the Bambara language as balanzan, and is the official tree of the city of Segou on the Niger River in central Mali. According to legend, Segou is home to 4,444 balanzan trees, plus one mysterious "missing tree" – the location of which cannot be identified.

In Serer and some of the Cangin languages, it is called Saas. Saas figures prominently in the creation myth of the Serer people. According to the myth, it is the tree of life and fertility. Similarly, the Bambara people of West Africa also associate the tree with the world's creation, believing that the original mass which birthed the planet Earth was converted into a seed of albida. Meanwhile, the Dogon people, also from Mali, associate the tree with long life: the elderly lie on boards made from its wood in the hope of achieving longevity, while corpses are place on litters made from the tree's branches.
