= El Faro =

El Faro may refer to:

- El Faro (digital newspaper), an online newspaper founded in 1998
- The Lighthouse (1998 film) (original title: El faro), an Argentine-Spanish drama
- El Faro Restaurant, a Spanish restaurant in New York City that closed in 2012
- El Faro Towers, a high-rise residential complex of two, twin interconnected skyscrapers in Buenos Aires
- SS El Faro, a cargo ship that sank with all hands in 2015
- Punta Maldonado in the Mexican state of Guerrero, alternatively known as El Faro

== See also ==
- Faro (disambiguation)
