= Kgakgamotso Pharo =

Motswana footballer

Personal information
- Full name: Kgakgamotso Pharo
- Date of birth: 17 June 1982 (age 44)
- Place of birth: Botswana
- Position: Striker

Senior career*
Years	Team	Apps	(Gls)
2004–2005	Defence Force		
2005–2007	Botswana Meat Commission		
2007–2008	TAFIC		
2008–	Boteti Young Fighters		

International career
1997–2002	Botswana	4	(0)
- * Club domestic league appearances and goals

Kgakgamotso Pharo (born 17 June 1982) is a Motswana footballer who currently plays as a striker for Boteti Young Fighters. He won four caps for the Botswana national football team in 2005.

== See also ==
- Football in Botswana
