= Maria Elena Foronda Farro =

Peruvian sociologist and environmentalist

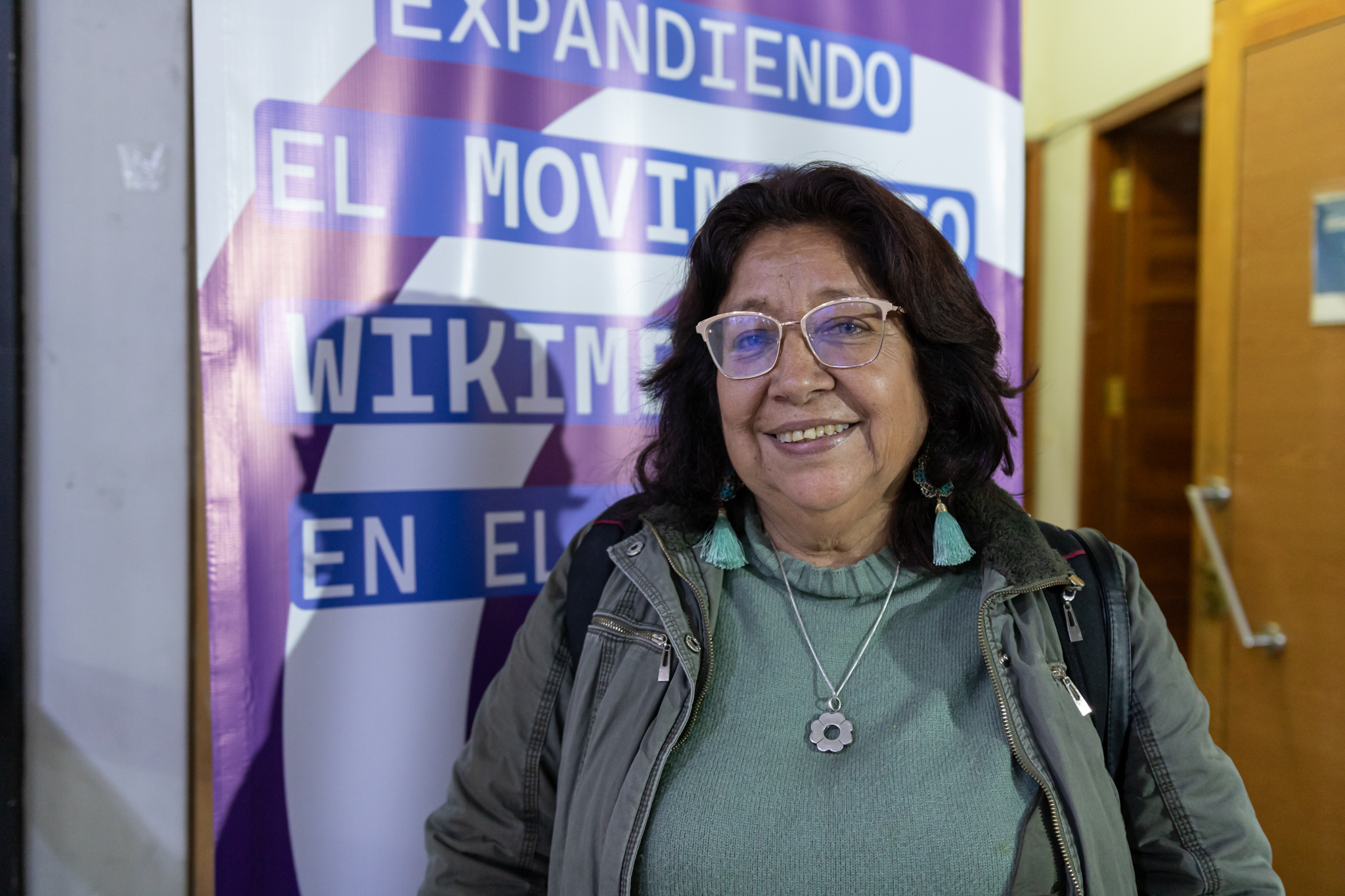
- María Elena Foronda in 2024
- Born: January 4, 1959 (age 67); Lima, Peru
- Education: National Autonomous University of Mexico
- Occupation: Sociologist
- Awards: Goldman Environmental Prize (2003)

Maria Elena Foronda Farro (born January 4, 1959) is a Peruvian sociologist and environmentalist. She was awarded the Goldman Environmental Prize in 2003, for her campaigns of improving waste treatment from the country's fishmeal industry. She was elected as congresswoman for the region of Ancash in 2016 as a member of The Broad Front for Justice, Life, and Freedom.

Growing up in Chimbote after her birth in Lima, her father inspired her interests in social issues through his work as a union lawyer. In Lima, Farro studied sociology; she went on to attain a master's degree in the subject at the National Autonomous University of Mexico. After completing her degree in the '80s, she returned to Chimbote to volunteer at Terra Nuova, an NGO that fosters sustainable development in countries in Africa and Latin America.

While she is no longer in congress, she is the director of the NGO Natura, which she co-founded in order to help improve both the environment and lives of the people within the low-income areas of Chimbote. Foronda founded another environmental organization, the Association for the Defense and Conservation for the province of Santa, as well.

== Activist Work ==
Foronda experienced the harms of the fishmeal first-hand growing up in Chimbote and the adverse effects it had on over 300,000 citizens. Some of which include wastewater flooding streets due to fish remnants clogging public drains and health issues, including the '90s Cholera breakout. Air pollution from factories has also contributed to Chimbote's average lifespan being 10 years less than that of the rest of the country.

As a port city, Chimbote is reliant on its fishing industry and the industrial pollution on its coasts is the highest of any Peruvian city. Specifically, this adverse effects of its fishmeal industry harms ecosystems and people. Despite the adverse effects of the industry, it supported the livelihoods of the majority of Chimbote, making it difficult for people to speak out against it. Fishmeal companies wield significant political and economic power in the region. Foronda was able work within the community to mobilize citizens by building bridges between workers and environmentalists to fight against these issues for the first time in history.

Foronda still advocates for realistic and concrete responses against climate issues. She works with community leaders in Chimbote to spread educational materials about environmental issues to school children and focuses on mobilizing young people. She develops programs to empower communities to defend their entitlement to live in an environment that is safe and healthy.

== Legal issues ==
The Peruvian government arrested Foronda and her husband after they were accused of being members of Shining Path, a communist guerilla group labelled a terrorist organization, in 1994. They were both sentenced to jail time, in which Foronda served a year and a half. With the help of campaigns, both local and international, the couple was freed. Foronda alleges her fight against Peruvian corporations is what led to her and her husband's arrest, and this attracted more attention to her cause.

== Goldman Award ==
Foronda was awarded the 2003 Goldman Environmental Prize in South and Central America for her fight against the fishmeal industry. Her father went to the ceremony in San Francisco for her after she was unable to due to visa issues.
