= Sarah Farro =

American novelist

Sarah E. Farro was a 19th-century African American novelist. Her only known novel, True Love: A Story of English Domestic Life, was published in 1891 by Donohue & Henneberry in Chicago. Despite being only one of a handful of known African-Americans that published a novel in the 1800s, little is known about her life.

According to census records, Farro was born in Illinois in about 1859. Her parents were born in the Southern United States and later moved to Chicago, and she had two younger sisters.

Farro published her novel True Love when she was 26 years old. At the time of its release, American newspapers stated it was the first novel to be published by an African-American woman. The book is a domestic romance and melodrama set in England, and follows the story of a man who is unable to marry his love, Janey, due to her mother's interference. Farro's favorite writers were Oliver Wendell Holmes, William Makepeace Thackeray, and Charles Dickens.

After the novel's release, it was praised by newspapers in both the United Kingdom and United States, and it was exhibited at the 1893 World's Fair: Columbian Exposition in Chicago, as part of an exhibit of 58 books by female writers from Illinois. In 1937, Farro was honored at a Chicago event that celebrated "outstanding race pioneers". Farro likely did not write another novel after her first, and her date of death is unknown.

== Early life ==
=== Family and childhood ===
Sarah E. Farro was born in Jefferson County, Illinois in 1859 to John Farro and Jemima "Jane" Jane. Although it is unknown how Farro's parents met or if they were formerly enslaved, they were living in Chicago when Sarah, their oldest child, was born, having left the South.

Farro is the oldest of three children having two younger sisters Alvira and Ammie. The Farros grew up in Avondale as a middle-class family in their own built property that John Farro's income supported.

Little information is known about Farro's education growing up as a child, but she is described as "a woman of good education" after the publication of her novel True Love: A Story of English Domestic Life.

== Later life ==
=== Community organizations ===
Sarah E. Farro was a member of the Old Settlers Club founded in 1943. The purpose of the club was to honor the earliest immigrant families and keep their legacy of Chicago alive. The Farro family was classified as members of the club because of her birth in the city. The Old Settlers Club recognized Farro as an old settler and the creator of True Love in 1937.

=== Death ===
The cause and further details of Farro's death are unknown. Little is known whether Farro was married since she never changed her name. She remained a respected part of Chicago's black community for a very long time.

== True Love: A Story of English Domestic Life ==
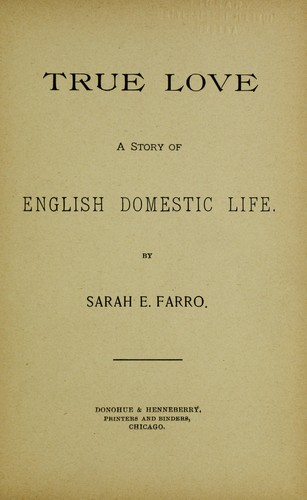
Front Page of Novel

=== Summary ===
Farro's first and only known novel, True Love: A Story of English Domestic Life, is set in an alternate England. The romance novel features wealthy aristocrat, Charles Taylor, and his difficulties in marrying middle-class, Janey, due to the intervention of her mother, Mrs. Brewster.

=== Publication ===
True Love's publication was thought to be the first novel an African American woman produced based on the people of the United States and Britain. After being copyrighted in 1891, the novel first received global awareness and publicity in 1892. Farro's novel gained publicity since it was focused on her race.

=== Significance ===
Farro's novel was considered one of the first works from an African American woman. The novel was one of the first works in the nineteenth century to be printed, distributed, and publicized after being written by a female Black author.
