= Faro (surname) =

Faro is a surname. Notable people with the surname include:

- Jonatas Faro (born 1987), Brazilian actor and singer
- Joseph Faro (fl. 1694–1696), pirate who primarily operated in the Indian Ocean
- Junior Faro (born 1978), weightlifter from Aruba
- Neusa Maria Faro (1945–2023), Brazilian actress and dubber
- Rodrigo Faro (born 1973), Brazilian actor, singer and TV presenter
