= Pharaoh (disambiguation) =

Pharaoh is the title of ancient Egyptian monarchs.

Pharaoh, Pharao or Pharoah may also refer to:

== Arts and entertainment ==
=== Film and literature ===
- Pharaohs in the Bible
- Pharaoh (Prus novel), a book a 1897 by Bolesław Prus
  - Pharaoh (film), a 1966 Polish film adaptation directed by Jerzy Kawalerowicz
- Pharaoh (Smith novel), a 2016 novel by Wilbur Smith
- "Pharaoh" (Old English poem), a fragmentary poem from the Exeter Book

=== Gaming ===
- Pharaoh (card game), or Faro, a 17th-century French gambling card game
- Pharaoh (module), an accessory for Dungeons & Dragons
- Pharaoh (video game), a 1999 city-building video game
  - Pharaoh: A New Era, a 2023 remaster of the 1999 video game

=== Music ===
- Oscar D'León (b. 1943), nicknamed The Pharaoh of Salsa
- Pharaoh (band), an American power metal band
- The Pharaohs, an American soul/jazz/funk band 1962–1973
- The Pharaohs, a 1960s American pop music group fronted by Sam the Sham
- Pharaoh (rapper), a Russian rapper
- Pharao, German Eurodance act
- Pharoah (album), by Pharoah Sanders, 1976
- "Pharoah", a 1982 song by Spandau Ballet, from the album Diamond
- "Pharaohs", a 1985 song by Tears for Fears, B-side of "Everybody Wants to Rule the World"
- "Pharaoh", a song by Symphony X from their 1997 album The Divine Wings of Tragedy

=== Other uses in arts and entertainment ===
- The Pharaohs, a fictional street gang in the 1973 film American Graffiti
- Ashley Pharoah (born 1959), a British screenwriter and television producer
- Jay Pharoah (born 1987), an American actor and comedian
- Pharoah Sanders (1940–2022), an American jazz saxophonist
- Pharoh Cooper (born 1995), an American football player

== Places ==
- Pharaoh's Island, an island in Egypt
- Pharoah, Oklahoma, a place in the U.S.

== Other uses ==
- Pharaoh ant, an insect
- Pharaoh Hound, a Maltese breed of dog
- Pharaoh (Book of Abraham), in Mormonism, a proper name of the first king of Egypt
- The Pharaohs, a nickname of the Egypt national football team
- Danish ship Færøe, erroneously translated as 'Pharaoh'
- "Pharaoh", a disc golf distance driver by Infinite Discs

== See also ==
- American Pharoah (foaled 2012), a Thoroughbred racehorse
- Faro (disambiguation)
- Faroe Islands
- Fårö, an island
- Pharoahe Monch (born 1972), American hip hop artist
- Pharaon, a ship in Dumas' novel The Count of Monte Cristo
