= Faros =

Village in Ikaria, Greece

Faros is a village at the southeast end of the island of Ikaria, Greece. It is located on a small plain home to many vineyards. Its beach is two miles (3.2 km) long (said to be the longest on the island). Many consider Faros to be a tourist destination. Faros has taverns, quiet bars, cafes, and windsurfing. 37°40′18″N 26°20′57″E.

Near Faros are Drakano Fortress, the ancient third capital of Ikaria, close to Iero Beach, the Cave of Dionysos, and a hilltop Italian Fortress from WWII.
