= Faro (mythology) =

Figure in Mandé mythology

In Mande mythology, Faro purified the earth by sacrificing himself to atone for his twin Pemba's sin.

In the ancient myth, two forces, Dya and Gla, gave rise to Faro and Pemba, embodiments of the sky and earth, respectively. Faro, a symbol of femininity and creation, was accompanied by her male counterpart, Koni, who derived his existence from her.

A pivotal event occurred when Faro's pond overflowed, causing a devastating flood. Seeking refuge, Faro, her followers, and animals boarded an ark, enduring seven days of tumultuous weather until the storm subsided. Emerging from the ark, Faro and a blacksmith companion initiated the founding of a village.

Under Faro's guidance, the village flourished with the cultivation of crops from seeds she provided. She also bestowed life upon animals and orchestrated the rhythms of day and night, as well as the changing seasons. Faro's crowning achievement was the creation of the Niger River, ensuring sustenance and vitality for all life.

Thus, through Faro's nurturing and leadership, the village thrived, symbolizing the enduring power of creation and harmony.
