= List of creation myths =

Creation myths of various cultures

A creation myth (or creation story) is a traditional myth which attempts to describe the earliest beginnings of the present world. Creation myths are the most common form of myth, usually developing first in oral traditions, and are found throughout human culture. A creation myth is usually regarded by those who subscribe to it as conveying profound truths, though not necessarily in a historical or literal sense. They are commonly, though not always, considered cosmogonical myths, that is, they describe the ordering of the cosmos from a state of chaos or amorphousness.

== Basic type ==
=== Creation from chaos ===
- Enûma Eliš (Babylonian creation myth)
- Eridu Genesis
- Genesis creation (Judaism, Christianity, Islam, and Rastafari)
- Greek cosmogonical myth
- Jamshid
- Korean creation narratives
- Kumulipo
- Mandé creation myth
- Pangu
- Raven in Creation
- Serer creation myth
- Tungusic creation myth
- Unkulunkulu
- Väinämöinen
- Viracocha

=== Earth diver ===
- Ainu creation myth
- Cherokee creation myth
- Haudenosaunee creation myth
- Väinämöinen
- Yoruba creation myth
- Ob-Ugric creation myth

=== Emergence ===
- Hopi creation myth
- Diné Bahaneʼ (Navajo)
- Zuni creation myth

=== Ex nihilo (out of nothing) ===
- Debate between sheep and grain
- Barton cylinder
- Ancient Egyptian creation myths
- Kabezya-Mpungu
- Māori myths
- Mbombo
- Ngai
- Popol Vuh

=== World parent ===
- Coatlicue
- Enûma Eliš
- Greek cosmogonical myth
- Heliopolis creation myth
- Hiranyagarbha creation myth
- Kumulipo
- Rangi and Papa
- Völuspá

=== Divine twins ===
- Proto-Indo-European creation myths

== Regional ==
=== Africa ===
- Ancient Egyptian creation myths
- Fon creation myth
- Kaang creation myth (San)
- Kintu myth (Bugandan)
- Mandé creation myth
- Mbombo (Kuba, Bakuba or Bushongo/Boshongo)
- Ngai (Kamba, Kikuyu and Maasai )
- Serer creation myth (cosmogony of the Serer people of Senegal, the Gambia and Mauritania)
- Unkulunkulu (Zulu)
- Yoruba creation myth (Yoruba people, West Africa)

=== Americas ===
Caribbean

- Taíno creation myths

==== Mesoamerica ====
- Coatlicue (Aztec)
- Maya creation of the world myth
- Popol Vuh (Quiché Mayan)

==== Mid North America ====
- Anishinaabeg creation stories
- Cherokee creation myth
- Choctaw creation myth
- Creek creation myth
- Hopi creation myth
- Iroquois creation myth
- Kuterastan (Plains Apache)
- Diné Bahaneʼ (Navajo)
- Raven in Creation (Tlingit, Haida, and Tsimshian)
- Zuni creation myth

==== South America ====
- Legend of Trentren Vilu and Caicai Vilu (Chilean)
- Viracocha (Incan)
- Xolas (Chilean)

=== Asia ===
==== Central Asia ====
- Ergenekon
- Mongolian creation myth
- Tungusic creation myth

==== East Asia ====
- Ainu creation myth (Japan)
- Au Co (Vietnamese)
- Chinese creation myth
- Japanese creation myth
- Korean creation narratives
- Vietnamese creation myth
- Nüwa (Chinese)
- Pangu (Chinese)

==== Indian subcontinent ====
- Ajativada
- Buddhist cosmology
- Folk Hindu creation myth
- Hiranyagarbha creation (India)
- Jainism and non-creationism (India)
- Meitei mythology (India)
- Mimamsa eternalism (India)
- Nyaya-Vaisheshika atomic theory (India)
- Samkhya-yoga theory (India)
- Sanamahi creation myth (India)

=== Europe ===
- Slavic creation myth
- Theogony (Greek)
- Book of Invasions (Celtic, specifically Irish)
- Väinämöinen (Finnish)
- Völuspá (Norse)

=== Middle East ===
- Debate between sheep and grain
- Enûma Eliš (Babylonian)
- Eridu Genesis (Sumerian)
- Genesis creation (Hebrew)
- Islamic creation myth (Arabic)
- Leviathan (Book of Job 38-41 creation myth)
- Mashya and Mashyana (Persian)

=== Pacific Islands/Oceanic ===
- Areop-Enap (Nauruan)
- Kumulipo (Hawaiian)
- Lafaek Diak (Timorese)
- Māori myths (Māori)
- Rangi and Papa (Māori)
- Sureq Galigo (Buginese)

=== Australian ===
The Australian Aboriginal concepts of "The Dreaming" or "Dreamtime".

== In mythopoeia ==
In mythopoeia, an artificial mythology created by writers of prose or other fiction, traditional mythological themes and archetypes are integrated into fiction. Some works of mythopoeia also feature creation myths:

- Ainulindalë from Tolkien's The Silmarillion
