= African traditional religions =

Diverse traditional beliefs and practices of African people

The beliefs and practices of African people are highly diverse and include various ethnic religions. Generally, these traditions are oral rather than scriptural and are passed down from one generation to another through narratives, songs, myths, and festivals. They include beliefs in spirits and higher and lower gods, sometimes including a supreme being, as well as the veneration of the dead, use of magic, and African traditional medicine. Most religions can be described as animistic with various polytheistic and pantheistic aspects. The role of humanity is generally seen as one of harmonizing nature with the supernatural.

== Spread and syncretism with Abrahamic religions ==
Adherents of traditional religions in Africa are distributed among 43 countries and are estimated to number over 100 million. Pew Research Centre's 2010 report which surveyed 19 Sub-Saharan African countries, found that many believe in 6 or more tenants derived from tribal, traditional African, or Animist practices. These beliefs were common in predominantly Muslim countries, in countries with a more even mix of Christians and Muslims, and in predominantly Christian countries.

Islam and Christianity, having largely displaced indigenous African religions, are often adapted to African cultural contexts and belief systems. African people often combine the practice of their traditional beliefs with the practice of Abrahamic religions. These two Abrahamic religions are widespread across Africa, though mostly concentrated in different regions. Abrahamic religious beliefs, especially monotheistic elements, such as the belief in a single creator God, were introduced into traditionally polytheistic African religions rather early. West African religions seek to come to terms with experienced reality, and in contrast to other systems of practice, are not idealisations. They generally seek to explain the reality of personal experience by spiritual forces which underpin orderly group life, contrasted by those that threaten it.

Followers of traditional African religions are also found around the world. In recent times, religions, such as the Yoruba religion and the Odinala religion (a traditional Igbo religion), Gaboism, are on the rise. The religions of the Igbo and Yoruba are popular in the Caribbean and portions of Central and South America. In the United States, Voodoo is more predominant in the states along the Gulf of Mexico.

== Basics ==
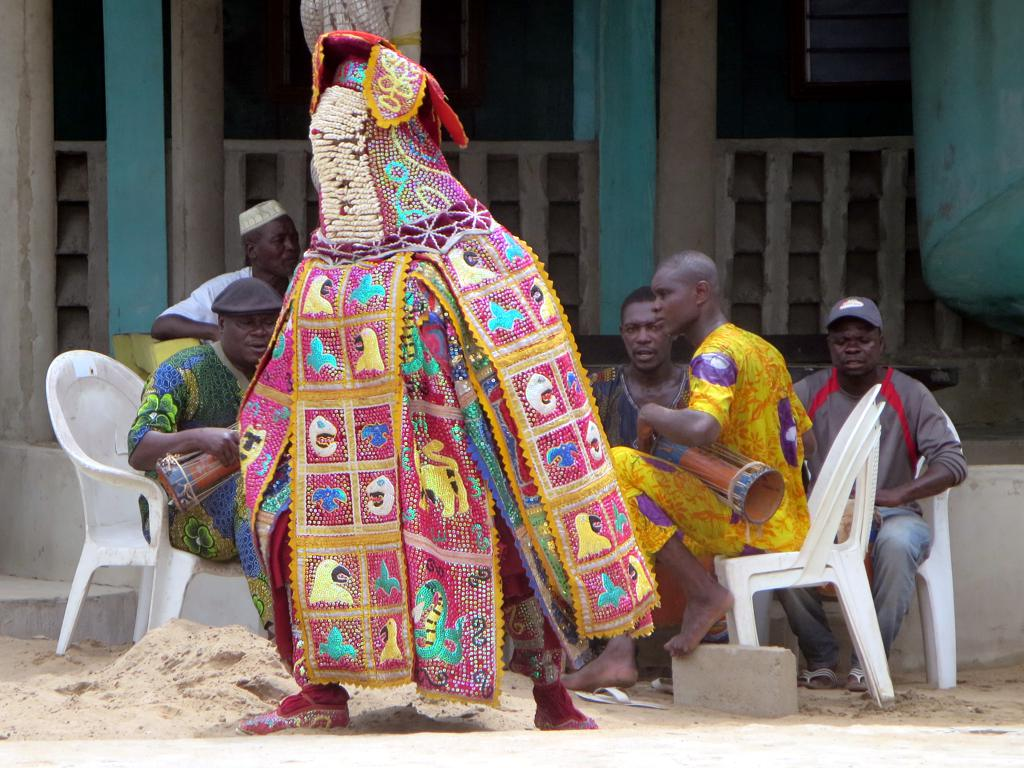
Traditional Vodun dancer enchanting gods and spirits, in Ganvie, Benin.

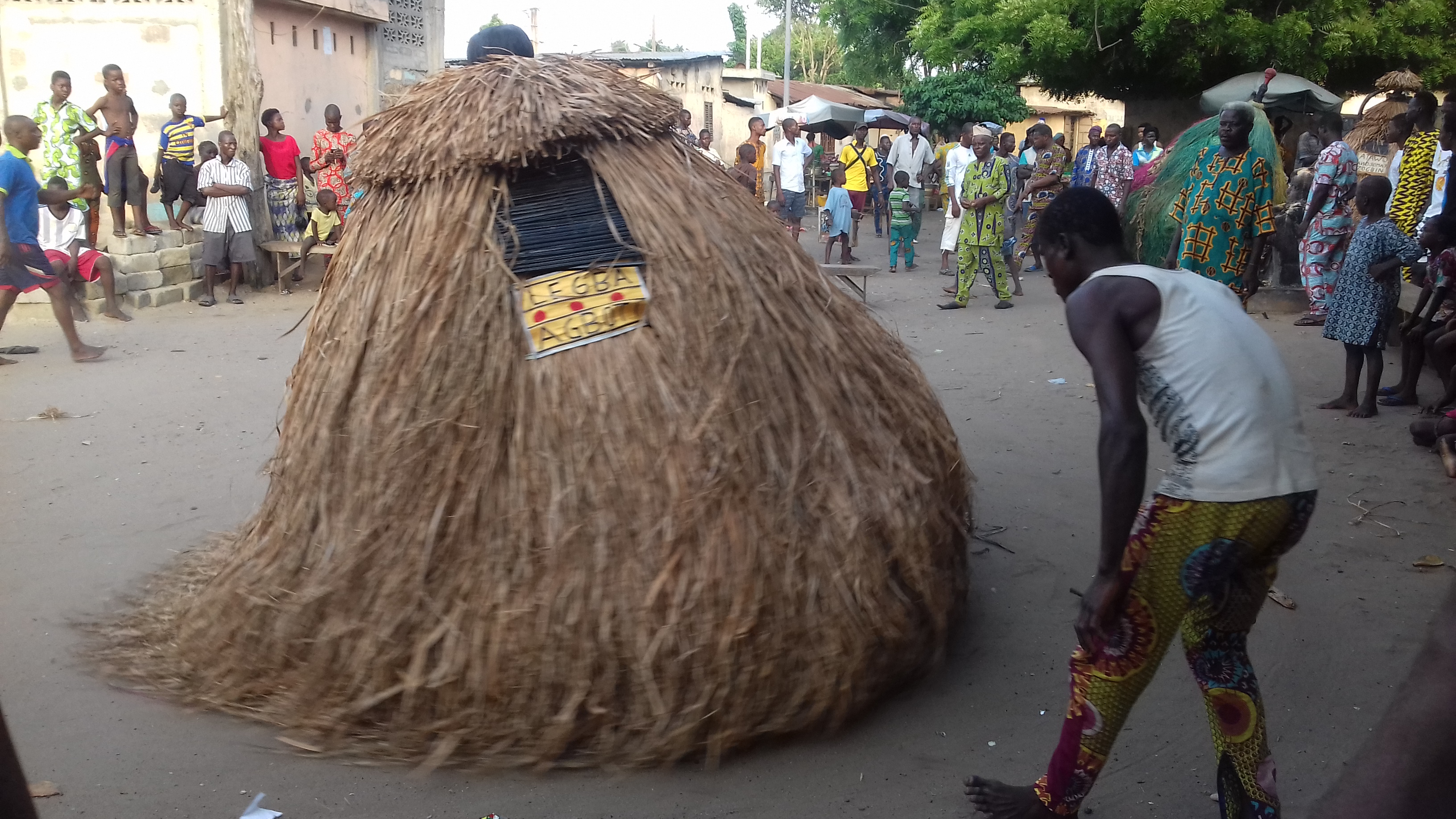
Local ceremony in Benin featuring a zangbeto.

Highly complex animistic beliefs build the core concept of traditional African religions. This includes the worship of tutelary deities, nature worship, ancestor worship and the belief in an afterlife, comparable to other traditional religions around the world. While some religions have a pantheistic worldview with a supreme creator god next to other gods and spirits, others follow a purely polytheistic system with various gods, spirits and other supernatural beings. Traditional African religions also have elements of totemism, shamanism and veneration of relics. Traditional African religion, like most other ancient traditions around the world, were based on oral traditions. These traditions are not religious principles, but a cultural identity that is passed on through stories, myths and tales, from one generation to the next. The community, one's family, and the environment, play an important role in one's personal life. Followers believe in the guidance and teachings of their ancestors spirits. Among many traditional African religions, there are spiritual leaders and kinds of priests. These individuals are essential in the spiritual and religious survival of the community. There are mystics that are responsible for healing and 'divining' - a kind of fortune telling and counseling, similar to shamans. These traditional healers have to be called by ancestors or gods. They undergo strict training and learn many necessary skills and acquire knowledge, including how to use natural herbs for healing and other, more mystical skills, like the finding of a hidden object without knowing where it is. Traditional African religions believe that ancestors maintain a spiritual connection with their living relatives. Most ancestral spirits are generally good and kind. Negative actions taken by ancestral spirits are to cause minor illnesses to warn people that they have gotten onto the wrong path. Other warning signs comes as outbreak of diseases. This makes them know that they have offended the gods.

Native African religions are centered on ancestor worship, the belief in a spirit world, supernatural beings and free will (unlike the later developed concept of faith). Deceased humans (and animals or important objects) still exist in the spirit world and can influence or interact with the physical world. Forms of polytheism were widespread in most of ancient Africa and other regions of the world before the introduction of Islam, Christianity, and Judaism. An exception was the short-lived monotheistic religion created by Pharaoh Akhenaten, who made it mandatory to pray to his personal god Aten (see Atenism). This remarkable change to traditional Egyptian religion was however reverted by his youngest son, Tutankhamun. High gods, along with other more specialized deities, ancestor spirits, territorial spirits, and beings, are a common theme among traditional African religions, highlighting the complex and advanced culture of ancient Africa. Some research suggests that certain monotheistic concepts, such as the belief in a high god or force (next to many other gods, deities and spirits, sometimes seen as intermediaries between humans and the creator) were present within Africa, before the introduction of Abrahamic religions. These indigenous concepts were different from the monotheism found in Abrahamic religions.

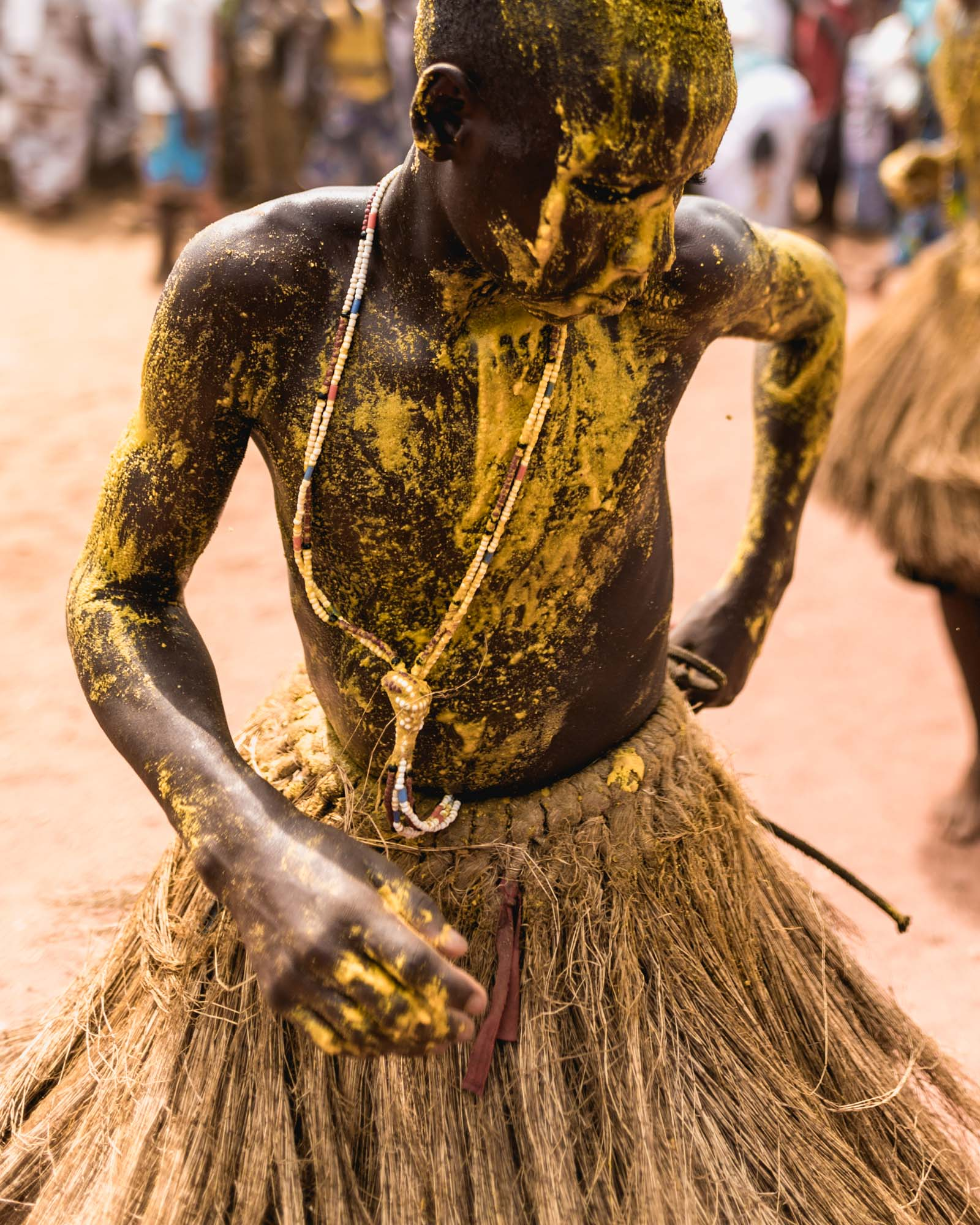
Traditional Koku dancer from Benin.

Traditional African medicine is also directly linked to traditional African religions. According to Clemmont E. Vontress, the various religious traditions of Africa are united by a basic Animism. According to him, the belief in spirits and ancestors is the most important element of African religions. Gods were either self-created or evolved from spirits or ancestors which got worshiped by the people. He also notes that most modern African folk religions were strongly influenced by non-African religions, mostly Christianity and Islam and thus may differ from the ancient forms.

Traditional African religions generally hold the beliefs of life after death (a spirit world or realms, in which spirits, but also gods reside), with some also having a concept of reincarnation, in which deceased humans may reincarnate into their family lineage (blood lineage), if they want to, or have something to fulfill. The Serer concept of reincarnation rejects the notion of the incarnation or reincarnation of the Supreme Deity and Creator Roog. However, the reincarnation of the Pangool or souls is a well-held belief in Serer spirituality.

There are often similarities between traditional African religions located in the same subregion. Central Africa, for instance, has similar religious traditions in countries of the Democratic Republic of the Congo, the Republic of the Congo, Rwanda, Burundi, Zambia, and Malawi. The people in these countries who follow traditional religious practices often venerate ancestors through rituals and worship the land or a "divinity" through "regional cults" or "shrine cults", respectively.

Jacob Olupona, Nigerian American professor of indigenous African religions at Harvard University, summarized the many traditional African religions as complex animistic religious traditions and beliefs of the African people before the Christian and Islamic "colonization" of Africa. Ancestor veneration has always played a "significant" part in the traditional African cultures and may be considered as central to the African worldview. Ancestors (ancestral ghosts/spirits) are an integral part of reality. The ancestors are generally believed to reside in an ancestral realm (spiritworld), while some believe that the ancestors became equal in power to deities.

The defining line between deities and ancestors is often contested, but overall, ancestors are believed to occupy a higher level of existence than living human beings and are believed to be able to bestow either blessings or illness upon their living descendants. Ancestors can offer advice and bestow good fortune and honor to their living descendants, but they can also make demands, such as insisting that their shrines be properly maintained and propitiated. A belief in ancestors also testifies to the inclusive nature of traditional African spirituality by positing that deceased progenitors still play a role in the lives of their living descendants.

Olupona rejects the western/Islamic definition of monotheism and says that such concepts could not reflect the complex African traditions and are too simplistic. While some traditions have a supreme being (next to other deities), others have not. Monotheism does not reflect the multiplicity of ways that the traditional African spirituality has conceived of deities, gods, and spirit beings. He summarizes that traditional African religions are not only religions, but a worldview, a way of life.

== Ceremonies ==
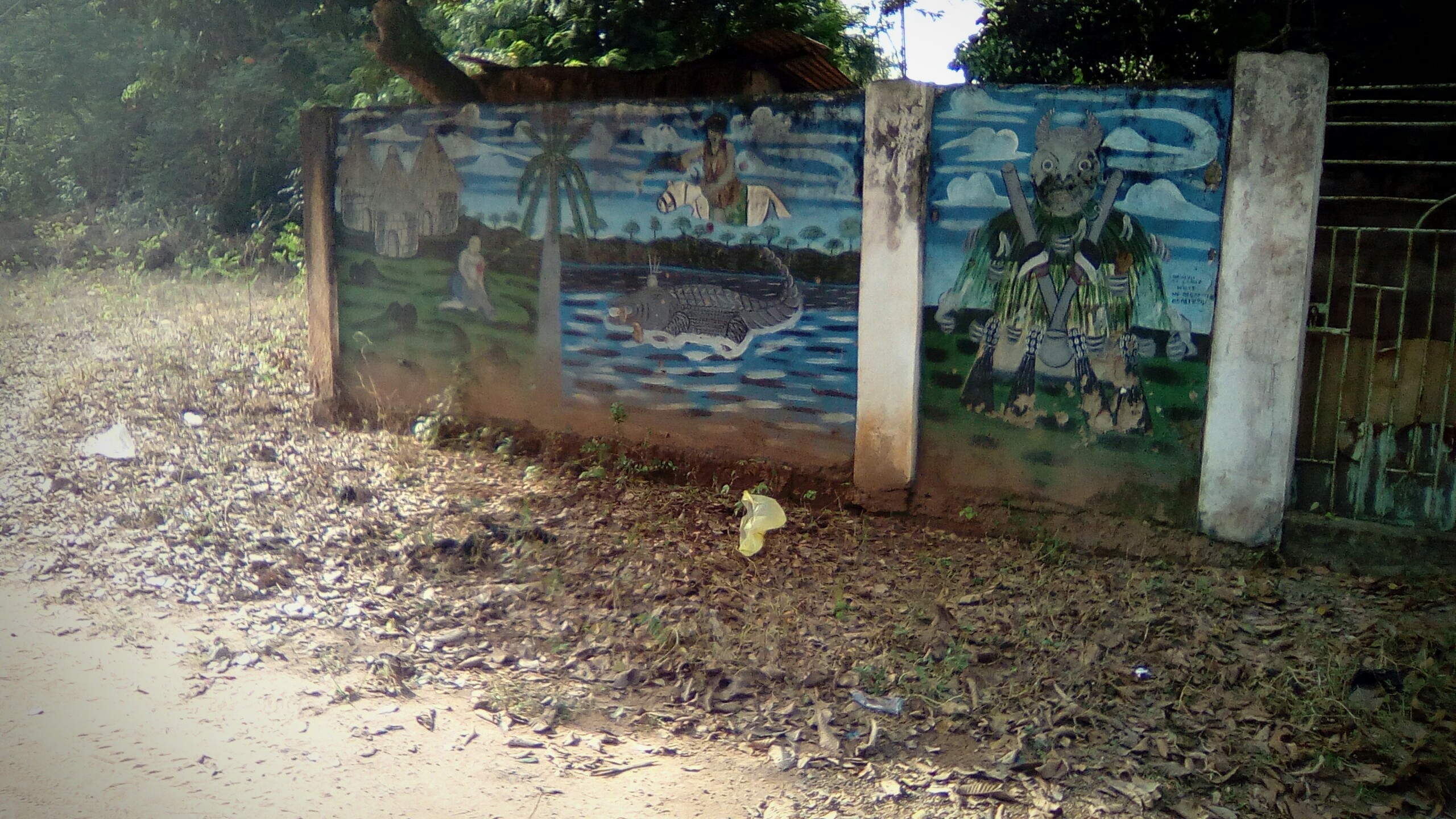
Religious couvent in south Ghana.

West and Central African religious practices generally manifest themselves in communal ceremonies or divinatory rites in which members of the community, overcome by force (or ashe, nyama, etc.), are excited to the point of going into meditative trance in response to rhythmic or driving drumming or singing. One religious ceremony practiced in Gabon and Cameroon is the Okuyi, practiced by several Bantu ethnic groups. In this state, depending upon the region, drumming or instrumental rhythms played by respected musicians (each of which is unique to a given deity or ancestor), participants embody a deity or ancestor, energy or state of mind by performing distinct ritual movements or dances which further enhance their elevated consciousness.

When this trance-like state is witnessed and understood, adherents are privy to a way of contemplating the pure or symbolic embodiment of a particular mindset or frame of reference. This builds skills at separating the feelings elicited by this mindset from their situational manifestations in daily life. Such separation and subsequent contemplation of the nature and sources of pure energy or feelings serves to help participants manage and accept them when they arise in mundane contexts. This facilitates better control and transformation of these energies into positive, culturally appropriate behavior, thought, and speech. Also, this practice can give rise to those in these trances uttering words which, when interpreted by a culturally educated initiate or diviner, can provide insight into appropriate directions which the community (or individual) might take in accomplishing its goal.

== Spirits ==
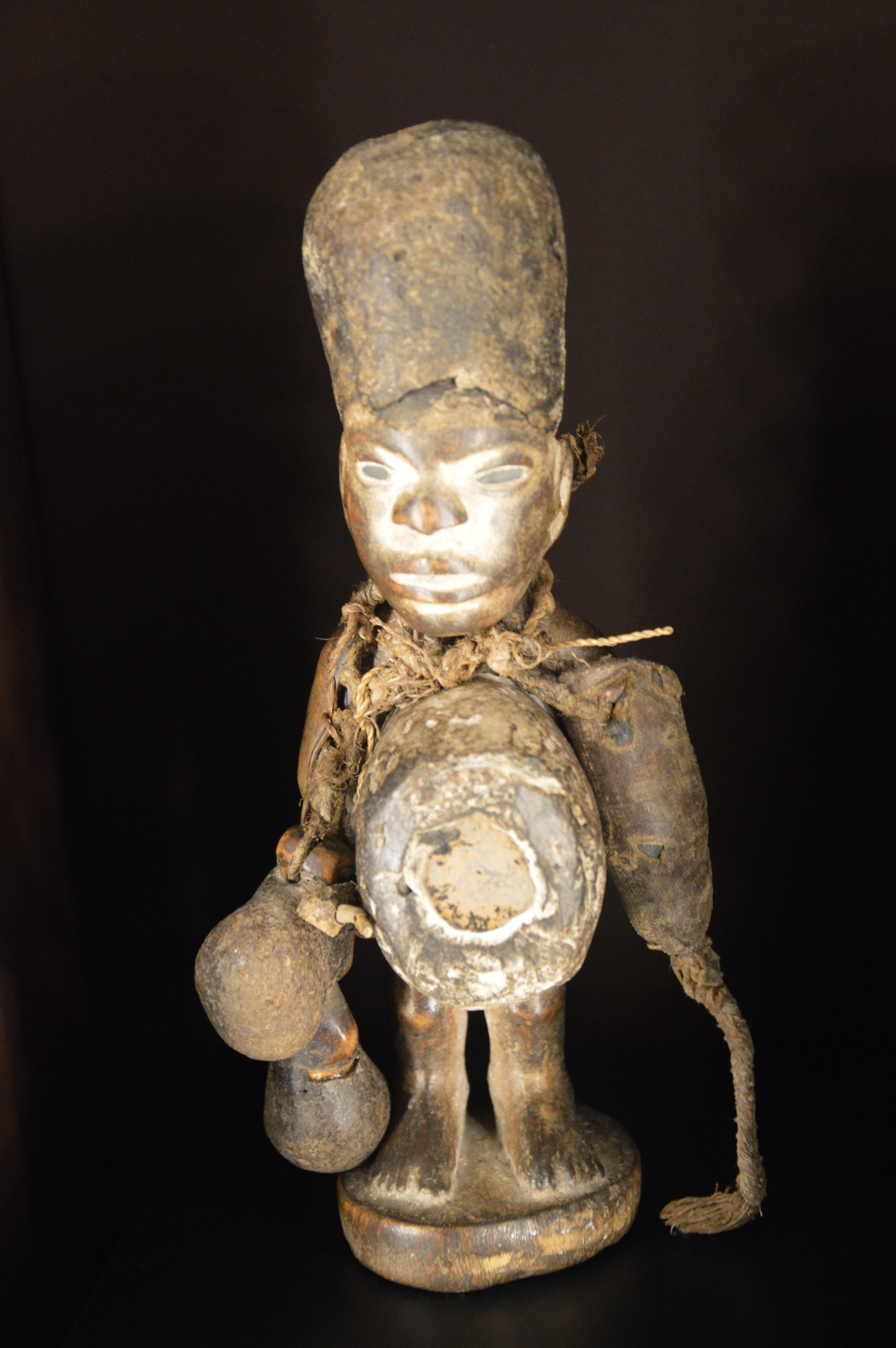
Nkisi nkondi of the Bakongo, from the 19th century. They are a subclass of nkisi, objects believed to be inhabited by spirits, common across the Congo Basin.

Followers of traditional African religions pray to various spirits as well as to their ancestors. This includes also nature, elementary, and animal spirits. The difference between powerful spirits and gods is often minimal. Most African societies believe in several "high gods" and a large amount of lower gods and spirits. There are also some religions with a single supreme being (Chukwu, Nyame, Olodumare, Ngai, Roog, etc.). Some recognize a dual god and goddess such as Mawu-Lisa.

Traditional African religions generally believe in an afterlife, one or more Spirit worlds. Ancestor worship is an important basic concept in nearly all African religions. Some African religions adopted different views through the influence of Islam or even Hinduism.

== Practices and rituals ==
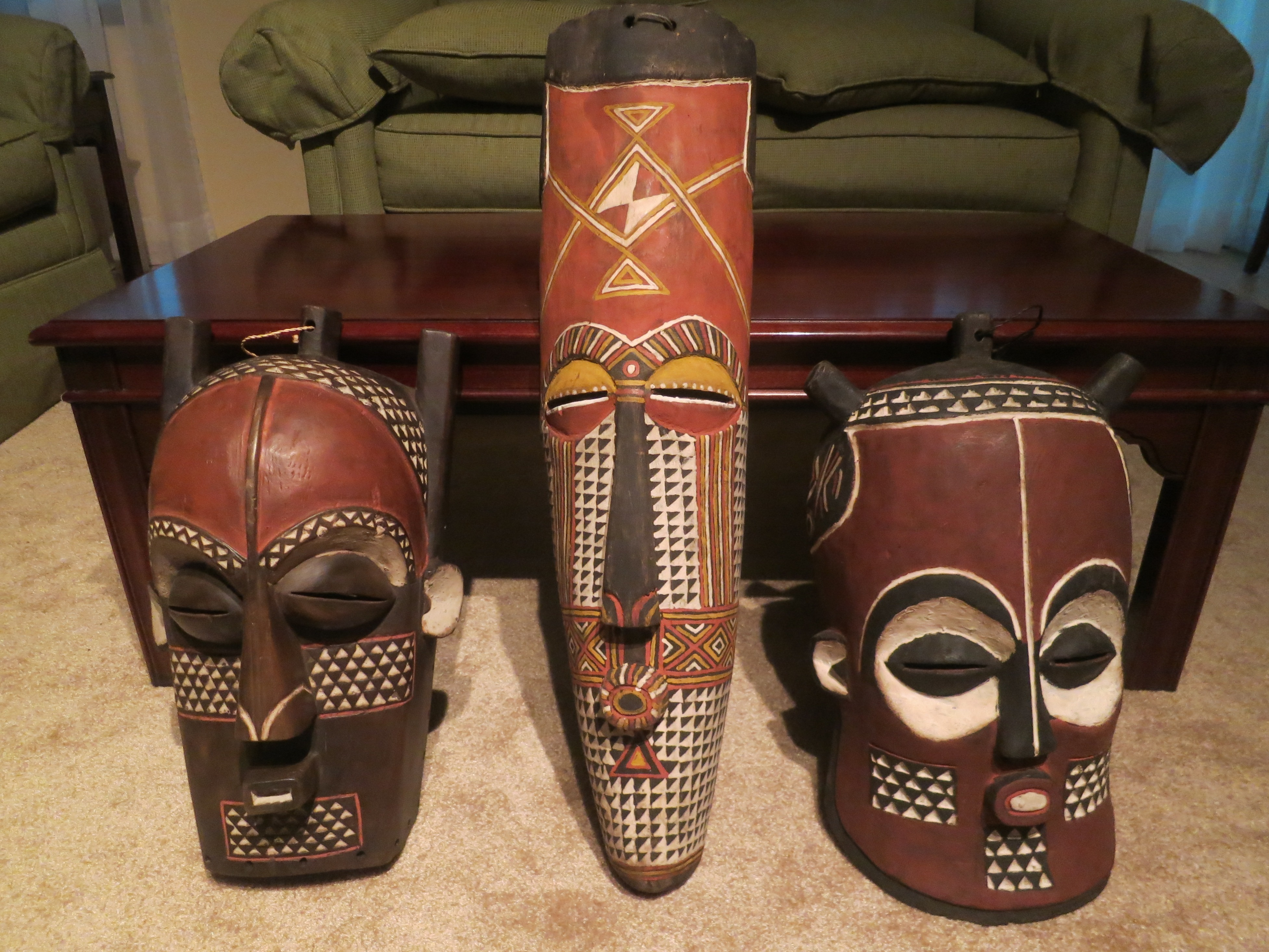
Modern Bakongo masks from the Kongo Central.

There are more similarities than differences between all traditional African religions, although Jacob Olupona has written that it is difficult to truly generalize them because of the sheer amount of differences and variations between the traditions. The deities and spirits are honored through libation or sacrifice of animals, vegetables, cooked food, flowers, semi-precious stones, or precious metals. The will of the gods or spirits is sought by the believer also through consultation of divinities or divination. Traditional African religions embrace natural phenomena – ebb and tide, waxing and waning moon, rain and drought – and the rhythmic pattern of agriculture. According to Gottlieb and Mbiti:

The environment and nature are infused in every aspect of traditional African religions and culture. This is largely because cosmology and beliefs are intricately intertwined with the natural phenomena and environment. All aspects of weather, thunder, lightning, rain, day, moon, sun, stars, and so on may become amenable to control through the cosmology of African people. Natural phenomena are responsible for providing people with their daily needs.

For example, in the Serer religion, one of the most sacred stars in the cosmos is called Yoonir (i.e.,Sirius). With a long farming tradition, the Serer high priests and priestesses (Saltigue) deliver yearly sermons at the Xooy Ceremony (divination ceremony) in Fatick before Yoonir's phase in order to predict winter months and enable farmers to start planting.

Traditional healers are common in most areas, and their practices include a religious element to varying degrees.

=== Divination ===
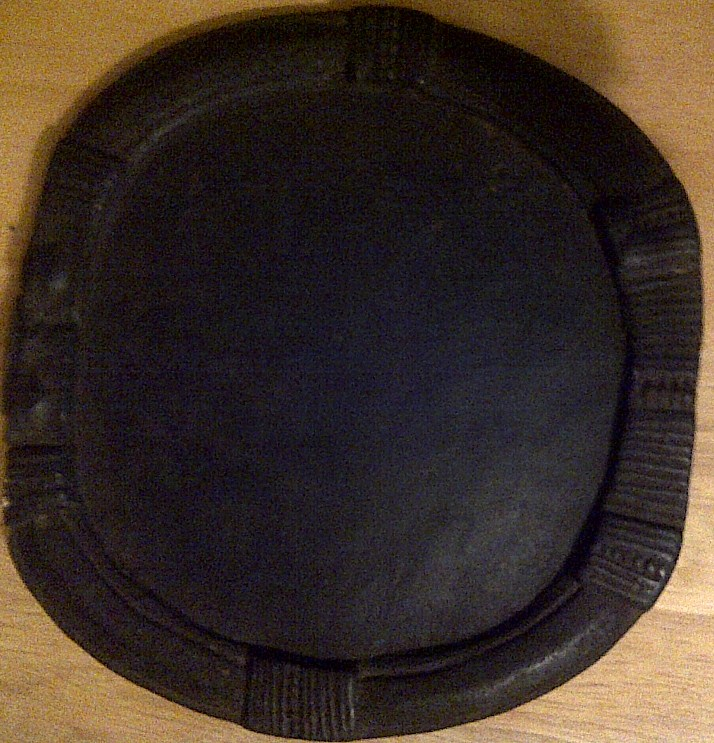
Early-20th-century Yoruba divination board.

Since Africa is a large continent with many ethnic groups and cultures, there is not one single technique of casting divination. The practice of casting may be done with small objects, such as bones, cowrie shells, stones, strips of leather, or flat pieces of wood.

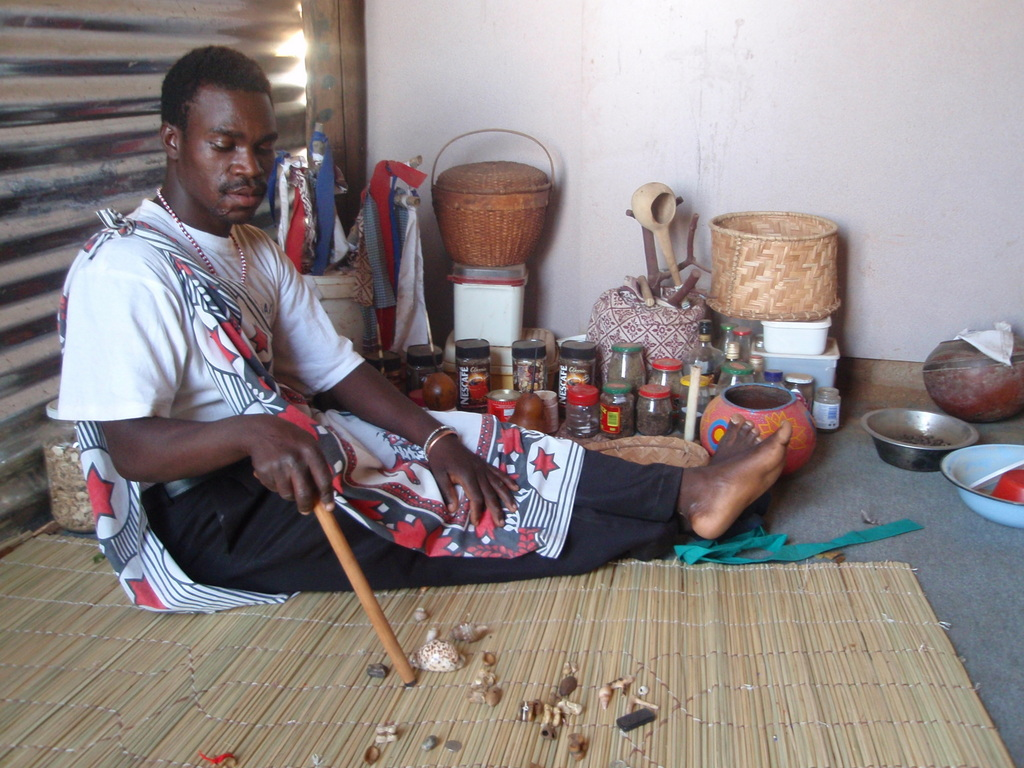
Traditional healer of South Africa performing a divination by reading the bones.

Some castings are done using sacred divination plates made of wood or performed on the ground (often within a circle).

In traditional African societies, many people seek out diviners on a regular basis. There are generally no prohibitions against the practice. Diviners (also known as priests) are sought for their wisdom as counselors in life and for their knowledge of herbal medicine.

== Ubuntu ==
Ubuntu is an Nguni Bantu term meaning "humanity". It is part of a concept sometimes translated as "I am because we are" (also "I am because you are"), or "humanity towards others" (in Zulu, umuntu ngumuntu ngabantu). In Xhosa, the latter term is used, but is often meant in a more philosophical sense to mean "the belief in a universal bond of sharing that connects all humanity". It is a collection of values and practices that people of Africa or of African origin view as making people authentic human beings. While the nuances of these values and practices vary across different ethnic groups, they all point to one thing – an authentic individual human being is part of a larger and more significant relational, communal, societal, environmental and spiritual world.

== Virtue and vice ==
Virtue in traditional African religion is often connected with carrying out communal obligations. Examples include social behaviors such as the respect for parents and elders, raising children appropriately, providing hospitality, and being honest, trustworthy, and courageous.

In some traditional African religions, morality is associated with obedience or disobedience to God regarding the way a person or a community lives. For the Kikuyu, according to their primary supreme creator, Ngai, acting through the lesser deities is believed to speak to and be capable of guiding the virtuous person as one's conscience.

In many cases, Africans who have converted to other religions have still kept up their traditional customs and practices, combining them in a syncretic way.

== Sacred places ==
Some sacred or holy locations for traditional religions include but not limited to Nri-Igbo, the Point of Sangomar, Yaboyabo, Fatick, Ife, Oyo, Dahomey, Benin City, Ouidah, Nsukka, Kanem-Bornu, Igbo-Ukwu, and Tulwap Kipsigis, among others.

== Religious persecution ==
Traditional African religions have faced persecution from Christians and Muslims. Adherents of these religions have been forcefully converted to Islam and Christianity, demonized and marginalized. The atrocities include killings, waging war, destroying of sacred places, and other atrocities.

Because of persecution and discrimination, as well as incompatibility with traditional society, culture and native beliefs, the Dinka people largely rejected or ignored Islamic and Christian teachings. The Serer ethnoreligious group of the Senegambia have faced religious and ethnic persecution since the 11th century from Muslims and Christians.

== Science and its relation to traditional worldviews ==
According to Bandama and Babalola (2023), indigenous African industrial practices historically integrated ritual and spiritual traditions alongside empirical techniques. They state that in the traditional African perspective:

The deities and gods are the emissaries of the supreme God and the patrons in charge of the workability of the processes involved. In the Ile-Ife pantheon, for example, Olokun – the goddess of wealth – is considered the patron of the glass industry and is therefore consulted. Sacrifices are offered to appease her for a successful run. The same is true for ironworking.

== Traditions by region ==
This list is limited to a few well-known traditions.

=== Central Africa ===
- Bantu mythology (Central, Southeast, Southern Africa)
  - Bushongo mythology (Congo)
  - Kongo religion (Congo)
  - Lugbara mythology (Congo)
  - Baluba mythology (Congo)
  - Mbuti mythology (Congo)
- Bwiti (Gabon)
- Hausa animism (Chad, Gabon)
- Lotuko mythology (South Sudan)

=== East Africa ===
- Kushite mythology (central parts of Sudan with origins in Kerma culture)
- Bantu mythology (Central, Southeast, Southern Africa)
  - Abaluhya mythology (Kenya)
  - Chagga religion (Tanzania)
  - Dini Ya Msambwa (Bungoma, Trans Nzoia, Kenya)
  - Gikuyu mythology (Kenya)
  - Akamba mythology
  - Aembu mythology (Kenya)
- Dinka religion (South Sudan)
- Malagasy mythology (Madagascar)
- Maasai mythology (Kenya, Tanzania, Ouebian)
- Kalenjin mythology (Kenya, Uganda, Tanzania)
- Waaqeffanna (Ethiopia and Kenya)
- Somali mythology (Somalia)

=== Northern Africa ===
- Ancient Egyptian religion (Egypt, Sudan)
  - Kemetism
- Kushite mythology (along the Nile valley in Egypt and Sudan)
- Punic religion (Tunisia, Algeria, Libya)
- Traditional Berber religion (Morocco (including Western Sahara), Algeria, Tunisia, Libya, Egypt, Mauritania, Mali, Niger, Chad, Burkina Faso)
  - Church of the Guanche People (Canary Islands)

=== Southern Africa ===
- Bantu mythology (Central, Southeast, Southern Africa)
  - Lozi mythology (Zambia)
  - Tumbuka mythology (Malawi)
  - Zulu traditional religion (South Africa)
- Badimo (South Africa, Botswana, Lesotho)
- San religion (Botswana, Namibia, and South Africa)
- Traditional healers of South Africa
- Indigenous religion in Zimbabwe

=== West Africa ===
- Abwoi religion (Nigeria)
- Akan religion (Ghana, Ivory Coast)
- Dahomean religion (Benin, Togo)
- Efik religion (Nigeria, Cameroon)
- Edo religion (Benin kingdom, Nigeria)
- Hausa animism (Benin, Burkina Faso, Cameroon, Gana/Ghana, Ivory Coast, Niger, Nigeria, Togo)
- Ijaw religion (Ijo people, Nigeria)
- Godianism (a religion that is purported to encompass all traditional religions of Africa, primarily based on Odinala)
- Odinala (Igbo people, Nigeria)
- Asaase Yaa (Bono people, Gana/Ghana and Ivory Coast)
- Serer religion (A ƭat Roog) (Senegal, Gambia, Mauritania)
- Yoruba religion (Nigeria, Benin, Togo)
- Vodou (Gana/Ghana, Benin, Togo, Nigeria)
- Dogon religion (Mali)

=== African diaspora ===
Afro-American religions involve ancestor worship and include a creator deity along with a pantheon of divine spirits such as the Orisha, Loa, Vodun, Nkisi and Alusi, among others. In addition to the religious syncretism of these various African traditions, many also incorporate elements of Folk Catholicism including folk saints and other forms of folk religion, Native American religion, Spiritism, Spiritualism, Shamanism (sometimes including the use of Entheogens) and European folklore.

Various "doctoring" spiritual traditions also exist such as Obeah and Hoodoo which focus on spiritual health. African religious traditions in the Americas can vary. They can have non-prominent African roots or can be almost wholly African in nature, such as religions like Trinidad Orisha.

== See also ==
- Folk religion – Expressions of religion distinct from the doctrines of organized religion
- List of African deities
- Witchcraft in Africa
