= Yalpus-Oyka =

In Ob-Ugrian mythology, Yalpus-Oika ('old man of the sacred town') or Konsyg-Oika was a guardian spirit and the mythical ancestor of the Por phratry of the Mansi people. From the 18th to the 20th century, the center of Yalpus-Oika's cult was the village of Vezhakary on the Ob River. Images of Yalpus-Oika have also been found in the villages of Verkhne-Nil'dino and Aneevo on the Northern Sosva River.

Yalpus-Oika could take the form of a bear. Among the Mansi, the word "bear" was taboo, so various euphemisms were used to refer to either the animal or the spirit, such as kwonsən-ōjka ('old man with claws'), wort-olən-ōjka ('old man living in the forest'), and mā-kolən-ōjka ('old man of the earthen house') were used.

In stories collected by József Pápay, Yalpus-Oika is the son of Kaltas-Ekwa and the brother of Mir-Susne-Hum. However, in some versions, Kaltas-Ekwa is considered Yalpus-Oika's sister, especially when she is worshipped as a local guardian spirit.

Yalpus-Oika was regarded as a benevolent and responsive guardian spirit, believed to protect people from diseases. Many illnesses were thought to occur when a person's shadow-soul left their body. In such cases, a shaman could collaborate with Yalpus-Oika to retrieve the soul and restore health.
