= Ob-Ugric creation myth =

The Ob-Ugric creation myth is the genesis story of the world in the mythology of the Khanty and Mansi people of Western Siberia. Their creation myth is very similar to the creation myths of other peoples of the Urals, sharing a lot of common elements, such as the skygod, the primordial waterfowl, the primordial waters, etc, but is also similar to the creation myths of many peoples of the northern hemisphere such as the Cherokees, Yukaghirs, Chukchis and Ainus. It is categorised as an Earth diver myth.

There once lived an old man and an old woman (skygod Numi-Toorum and fertility goddess Kaltaš). They lived in a cottage in the middle of an ocean. They lived like that for a long time, until one day a rumble was heard from the upper sky. The old man looked outside of the window and saw that from the sky fell a loon, who landed on the water and was looking for land. It dived into the water three times, until it finally found a bit of mud and flew with it back to the sky. The next day, a rumble was heard again. The same loon came down from the sky and was looking for land again. After diving into the water three times, it came out with mud on its beak. The loon rubbed the mud on the house where the old man and old woman lived, and flew back to the sky once again. The mud grew and grew and after three days, the whole world was covered in it.
