= Buga (deity) =

Buga is a creator god and omnipotent highest power in the mythology of the Tungusic peoples.

== Etymology and Ethnography ==
For the Tungus the term buga (also buya, boya, boga) refers to the greatest, omnipotent, eternal being. The same word also means either "sky", "universe", and may also refer to terms corresponding to "world" or "locality". The word is not taboo and is used in common speech. According to Shirokogoroff the term is an old one, and was not introduced by Christian missionaries.

For the eastern Tungus buga is a remote figure whom they have no description of, and nor do their shamans connect with it/him. The buga forms an exception in that it is one spirit than cannot be mastered by a shaman. Shirokogoroff states that all Tungus know how to pray/make sacrifices to buga and that activity is done without the intercession of shaman.

Furthermore, bugady are a tribe's sacred places. Equivalent names for a supreme deity are Es (Ket language), Nga (Enets language), and Turum or Torym (Khanty language).

The Tungus term 'buga' is similar to the Mongolian term bogdo (holy), Old Persian language baga (god), and the Kassite language bugas (god).

The Even language term for the highest deity (the creator) is/was Nalban Omgo Ogyn Buga, the proper name in the same language is Hovky-Sovky; in the Evenk language the god's name is Shavaky-Savaky. The "upper" and "lower" worlds in those people's shamanic worldview are also referred to as Dulyn Buga and Harpy Buga.

== Tungusic creation myth ==
In a Tungusic creation myth Buga creates both the earth (using fire to create it within a watery void), as well as creating man and woman from fire, earth, iron, and water. In the myth he is opposed by Buninka, a devil figure, who becomes responsible for evil persons after death.
