= Bemba (deity) =

Creator god of the Bambara people in Mali

Bemba (also known as Ngala or Pemba) is the creator god in the traditional religion of the Bambara people of Mali. The name is used to refer to Bemba, who is portrayed as a god consisting of four distinct beings (Pemba, Nyale, Faro, and Ndomadyiri) and is sometimes used to refer to one of its members, Pemba. Although Bemba is often referred to as male, the union of these four beings as Bemba is hermaphroditic, with the male aspects represented by Pemba and Ndomadyiri, while the female aspects are represented by Nyale and Faro.

Bemba plays a central role in Bambara religion, although opinions are divided as to whether he is considered as a supreme high god, or whether recent interpretations of his position were due to Islamic influences. Mandé religion also features Pemba and Faro in their cosmology, although their roles are dissimilar to their depictions in Bambara religion.

== Representation ==
As the representation of the four gods, Bemba is depicted as a deity who plays a large part in the creation of the universe and everything in it. Although Bemba's role is central in Bambara traditions, he is not worshipped directly, since it is said that after creating the universe, Bemba retreated to the heavens. Like many African creator gods, Bemba is omnipresent but does not exist in the physical world. Since there is no physical representation of Bemba, and thus Bamara worship practices focus on presenting offerings and prayers to minor gods or spiritual entities (e.g., Nya, Nyawrole, Nama, Komo). Due to the importance of agriculture in Bambara traditions, Bemba is also often associated with grains.

Since Bemba consists of four separate entities, each part plays a different role in the Bambara creation myth and presented different aspects of Bemba:

=== As Pemba ===
Pemba is known to be the god of the skies and air. He plays a large role in the creation myth with his twin sister, Nyale, who is also sometimes depicted as his wife. In some accounts, Pemba was also depicted as a grain that fell to earth and became the apple-ring acacia.

=== As Nyale ===
Nyale, also known as Musukoroni or Mouso Koroni Koundyé, is described as a goddess of fire, while as Musukoroni, in several versions of the creation myths, she is known to be the goddess of chaos. In certain versions, Musukoroni was born out of the mildew of Pemba's tree and saliva. After creating all living things on earth, Musukoroni disappeared and became Nyale. When she became Nyale, she is viewed as a fertility goddess, though her role is eventually supplanted by Faro. Nyale is said to be the first sorcerer, yet at the same time, she is still considered as a chaos goddess, which led her to be associated with malicious energy.

=== As Faro ===
In myths, Faro is sometimes portrayed as a female or male deity, who is associated with dominion over water. While the creation phase of the earth is controlled by Musukoroni and Pemba; Faro is in charge of the next phase, which is meant to stabilize the earth created by Musukoroni and Pemba. Thus, Faro became associated with benevolent aspects of creation that Musukoroni previously embodied, such as fertility. Faro is also often associated with equilibrium and eternal life.

=== As Ndomadyiri ===
Ndomadyiri is a male god that is associated with earth. He appears after Faro has successfully stabilized and organized life on earth, and is often depicted as a blacksmith and healer. Just like Faro, Ndomadyiri is meant to provide stability to humans, though in his case, he is meant to do so by teaching humans religious rites.

== Role in myths ==
=== Creation of the universe ===
It is said that Bemba created the first set of twins, Musukoroni and Pemba, who initially lived in the heavens. They chose to leave heaven when Bemba did not reveal to them which of his creation he most preferred. As they set themselves down to earth, they cut the cord connecting the heaven and earth, which severed the connection irreparably. Then, Musukoroni had sexual intercourse with themselves, and everything that existed in the universe, including the sun and her twin, Pemba, which led to the creation of the first humans and other animals.

When Bemba found out, he was enraged, and to teach the first twins a lesson, he created another set of twins: Faro, who is female, and Koni, who is male. Musukoroni was envious of Faro so she wreaked havoc by turning humans against her and destroying those she already had intercourse with. As punishment for her actions, Bemba sent a flood to cleanse the earth. Musukoroni died in this disaster, which led Faro to be the one entrusted by Bemba to help the surviving humans and animals repopulate the earth.

== See also ==
- List of African mythological figures
- Mandé creation account
- Bambara people
