= Postajankt-iki =

Mythological character

Postajankt-iki ("the fast old man") is the youngest son of the god Num-Torum in Ob-Ugrian mythology. He has several other names: Sorni-iki ("the golden old man"), and Õi-shlapt-lah-hliotõ-iki (which is used if one wishes to prevent him from being frightened during an offering). He rides upon a white horse. Postajankt-iki is easily started when someone calls his name (even jumping into the air), but it is not wise to call him for no reason because then woe befalls that person, according to the myths.

== External links and references ==
- World view of the Hanti
