= Mir-Susne-Hum =

Hero

Mir-Susne-Hum (Mir-Setivi-Ho, Kan-iki or Otr-iki ) (lit. The world observing man) is a culture hero of the Samoyedic and Ob-Ugrian peoples. He was the seventh son of Num-Torum, the supreme god of the Ob-Ugrian peoples, and acted as a mediator between humans and the god Num-Torum. Because Mir-Susne-Hum's mother, Kaltes-Ekwa, was defeated by her husband in heaven, this meant that Mir-Susne-Hum had to be born on earth. His antagonist was Jelping-Ja-Oyka.

After a certain transformation, Mir-Susne-Hum was given an iron horse with eight wings.

== External links and references ==
- "A rise of Mir-Susne-Hum." Graphic cycle dedicated to a national Ob-Ugrian (Ostyak - Hant and Vogul - Mansi) hero.
- World view of the Hanti
