= Ainu creation myth =

Creation myth of Japan's Ainu peoples

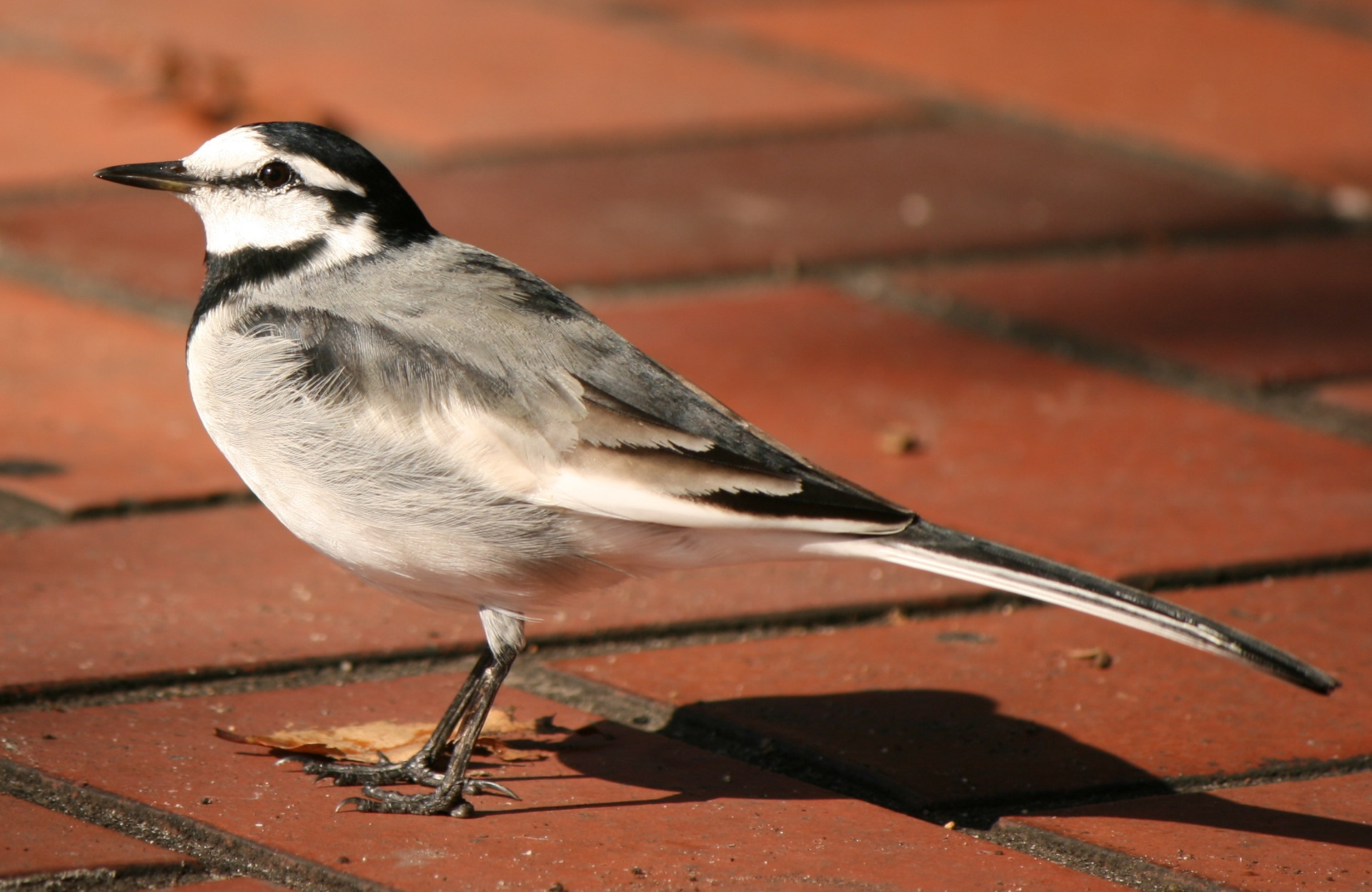
Water wagtail

The Ainu creation myths are the traditional creation accounts of the Ainu peoples of Japan. Their stories share common characteristics with Japanese creation myths and earth diver creation stories commonly found in Central Asian and Native American cultures. Although Ainu mythology has characteristics in common with the Japanese, whom they have interacted with for since the early 19th century, their creation myth remains their own.

== Creation myths ==
Ainu mythology divides time into three tenses: "Mosir sikah ohta" ("when the universe was born"), "mosir noskekehe" ("centre of the world"), and "mosir kes" ("end of the world", about which there are no detailed concepts recorded from Ainu mythology). English missionary John Batchelor related a myth the Ainu told him about before the first kamuy created the world, there was only a vast swamp in which lived a large trout, and the creator placed the world upon the trout, so that the fish sucks in and spits out water from the sea, causing the tides.

In one version, the creator deity, Kotan-kar-kamuy, sends down a water wagtail to create habitable land in the watery world below. Since the creator sends an animal down to the world to assist in the creation, the Ainu myth can be called a derivative of the earth-diver creation type which is commonly found in Central Asia and Native American cultures. The little bird fluttered over the waters, splashing water aside, and then it packed patches of the earth firm by stomping them with its feet and beating them with its tail. In this way, islands where the Ainu were later to live were raised to float upon the ocean. At this point the world was devoid of vegetation. Sometime later humans were created, and after that as there was nothing to make fire, Kamuy-huci descended to the world to provide humans with fire.

== Origin myth ==
Ainu tend to be somewhat hirsute, at least in comparison to other East Asian populations. Therefore, many Ainu stories maintain that their first ancestor was either a bear or a wolf. However, an alternative version tells of Kamuy sending a heavenly couple to earth called Okikurumi and Turesh. This couple had a son, whom some consider the first Ainu, and he is believed to have given the people the necessary skills to survive.

== Assimilation ==
As result of assimilation, most of the Ainu people are Japanese speakers and do not speak the Ainu language. The literature now exists in forms of written texts which have been fixed but still remain to be many versions of the same tales.

== See also ==
- Ainu religion
