= Kuterastan =

Kuterastan is the creator in a creation myth of the Kiowa Apache from the southern plains of North America. His name means "One Who Lives Above".

The story of his creation tells that in the beginning, before there were earth or sky there was only darkness. Into it came a small and thin disc with yellow and white on its alternate sides, and inside it sat Kuterastan, a small bearded man no larger than a frog. Kuterastan is described as awakening and rubbing his eyes. When he peers above him into the darkness it filled with light and illuminated the darkness below. When he looked east the light became tinged with the yellow of dawn, and when he looked west the light was shaded with the amber tones of dusk. As he glanced about himself clouds in different colors appeared. Then again Kuterastan rubbed his eyes and face, and as he flung the sweat from his hands another cloud appeared with a tiny little girl Stenatliha sitting on top. Stenatliha's name translates as the Woman Without Parents. Kuterastan and Stenatliha were puzzled where the other had come from, and where were the Earth and Sky. After thinking for some time, Kuterastan again rubbed his eyes and face, then his hands together, and from the sweat flying as he opened hands first Chuganaai, the Sun, and then Hadintin Skhin, or Pollen Boy, appeared. After the four sat a long time in silence on a single cloud, Kuterastan finally broke the silence to say, "What shall we do?" and started the creation.

The story describes the sequence, with Nacholecho, the Tarantula, the first to be created. Kuterastan followed by making the Big Dipper, the wind, lightning, and thunder, each given their characteristic tasks. Finding the cloud a poor home, he then turned his attention to making the earth. With the sweat of the four gods mixed together in Kuterastan's palms there emerged a small brown ball no bigger than a bean. This was expanded as the gods kicked the small brown ball. Then the wind went inside the ball and to inflate it. Tarantula attached to the ball a spun black cord and stretched it far to the east. Tarantula also attached one cord each of blue, yellow and white to the ball pulling one far to the south, another west, and the last to the north. When Tarantula was finished, the earth was vast expanse of smooth brown plain. Poles were placed at each corner to hold the earth in place. And at this Kuterastan sang a repeating refrain, "The world is now made and it sits still."
