= Jacob K. Olupona =

Nigerian American academic (born 1951)

- Born: Jacob Kehinde Olupona; 5 February 1951 (age 75); Ondo State, Nigeria
- Education: B.A. Religious Studies University of Nigeria, 1975 M.A. History of Religions, Boston University, Boston (1981), PhD, History of Religions, Boston University, Boston (1983).
- Occupations: Professor, writer, scholar
- Notable work: African Spirituality: Forms, Meanings and Expressions. City of 201 Gods: Ilé-Ifè in Time, Space, and the Imagination (University of California Press 2011)

Jacob Kehinde Olupona (born 1951) is a Nigerian-born American professor, writer, and scholar of religious studies. He is a professor of African Religious Traditions at the Harvard Divinity School with a joint appointment as Professor of African and African American Studies in the Faculty of Arts and Sciences at Harvard University. Olupona was elected to the American Academy of Arts and Sciences in April 2023.

== Biography ==
Olupona is a scholar of Indigenous African religions who came to Harvard after serving as a professor at the University of California, Davis.

He is working on a study of the religious practices of the estimated one million Africans who have emigrated to the United States over the last 40 years, examining in particular several populations that remain relatively invisible in the American religious landscape: "reverse missionaries" who have come to the U.S. to establish churches, African Pentecostals in American congregations, American branches of independent African churches, and Indigenous African religious communities in the U.S. His earlier research includes African spirituality and ritual practices, spirit possession, Pentecostalism, Yoruba festivals, animal symbolism, icons, phenomenology, and religious pluralism in Africa and the Americas.

In his forthcoming book Ile-Ife: The City of 201 Gods, he examines the modern urban mixing of ritual, royalty, gender, class, and power, and how the structure, content, and meaning of religious beliefs and practices permeate daily life.

He has authored or edited seven other books, including Kingship, Religion, and Rituals in a Nigerian Community: A Phenomenological Study of Ondo Yoruba Festivals, which has been used for ethnographic research among Yoruba-speaking communities.

Olupona has received grants from the Guggenheim Foundation, the American Philosophical Society, the Ford Foundation, the Davis Humanities Institute, the Rockefeller Foundation, the Wenner-Gren Foundation, and the Getty Foundation. He also founded the IIAS in Ile-Ife, Nigeria. He has served on the editorial boards of three journals and as president of the African Association for the Study of Religion. In 2000, Olupona received an honorary doctorate in divinity from the University of Edinburgh in Scotland.

== Early life and education ==
Jacob K. Olupona was born into a family where the lineages of both parents were well known Anglican and non-Anglican priests. The many religious activities and denominations he experienced in the villages, towns and cities he grew up in interested him, greatly. He watched as people mixed traditions. As he grew older, the perception of multi-religious traditions of Islam, Christianity and Indigenous religion opened spaces for the drive for his early scholarship on the ideology and rituals of Yoruba sacred kingship.

He graduated from the university in 1975 and did his National Youth Service Corps (NYSC) in Ilorin. During his service year in Ilorin, the host Governor of Kwara state, Colonel Ibrahim Taiwo was killed in a military coup as well as General Murtala Muhammed which filled the nation with unease in 1976. The memorial church service held for the general and the preaching of an Anglican Priest in the event heightened his scholarly imagination. Jacob K. Olupona began to think deeply of the connection of religious pluralism and civil religion in Nigeria. These events made him appreciate his own religious background and the freedom of worship in southwestern Nigeria.

Olupona received his BA degree from the University of Nigeria and his MA degree and Ph.D. from Boston University.

== Awards ==
- Nigerian National Order of Merit Award (2007)

== Publications ==
=== Books ===
- African Religions: A Very Short Introduction, ISBN 978-0199790586, Oxford University Press, 2014
- African Immigrant Religions in America (New York University 2007)
- Orisa Devotion as World Religion: The Globalization of Yoruba Religious Culture
- Beyond Primitivism: Indigenous Religious Traditions and Modernity (Routledge, 2004)
- Experiences of Place (Religions of the World) (Harvard Center for the Study of World Religions 2003)
- African Spirituality: Forms, Meanings and Expressions (Herder & Herder, 2001)
- Religious Plurality in Africa: Essays in Honour of John S. Mbiti (Mouton de Gruyter, 1993)
- Religion and Peace in Multi-faith Nigeria (African Books Collective Ltd, 1992)
- Kingship, Religion and Rituals in a Nigerian Community (Almqvist & Wiksell International, 1991)
- African Traditional Religions in Contemporary Society (Paragon House, 1991)
- City of 201 Gods: Ilé-Ifè in Time, Space, and the Imagination (University of California Press 2011)

=== Articles ===
- "Osun across the Waters: A Yoruba goddess in Africa and the Americas." African Affairs 104.416 (2005): 548–550.
- Foreword to Women in the Yoruba Religious Sphere. Ed. Oyeronke Olajubu. State University of New York Press, 2003.
- Review of "Odun Ifa: Ifa Festival" and "Insight and Artistry in African Divination." Research in African Literatures 34.2 (2003): 225–229.
- "Review of 'Religious Encounter and the Making of Yoruba.'" The International Journal of African Historical Studies 36.1 (2003): 182–186.
- "Women's Rituals, Kingship and Power among the Ondo-Yoruba of Nigeria." Annals of the New York Academy of Sciences 810 (1997): 315–336.
- "Report of the Conference 'Beyond Primitivism: Indigenous Religious Traditions and Modernity.'" Numen 44.3 (1997): 323–345.
- "The Study of Yoruba Religious Tradition in Historical Perspective." Numen 40.3 (1993): 240–273.
- "The spirituality of Africa" The Harvard Gazette (2015).
