= Amadlozi =

Spiritual figures of Nguni people

Amadlozi are African spiritual figures of the Nguni people. The Nguni people believe that these entities can be summoned for assistance and protection. This belief plays an integral part in explaining some of the attitudes Nguni people have around subjects such as fertility, life, death, fortune, and misfortune. Amadlozi are also believed to have the power to guide their people towards a life of purpose and integrity. These figures are also said to be governed by superior spiritual beings known as iThonga. iThonga is regarded as primary custodians of umsamo (Nguni's physical and spiritual center).

The Nguni people believe there is no way to lead normal lives without giving thanks to the elders who came before them. There are different ways they show their gratitude and pay their respects to these spiritual figures. Slaughtering an animal such as a cow, goat or chicken, is seen as a way of appeasing amadlozi for example. Amadlozi are highly regarded as life-giving forces and are respected as so throughout generations in the Nguni culture.
