= Fon creation myth =

Creation story of the Fon peoples of West Africa

The Fon creation myth is the traditional creation story of the Fon peoples of West Africa. Various versions of the creation story are told. In most the creator is either Mawu, the moon being and mother of all the gods and humanity, or Mawu-Lisa, the sun/moon being who is both male and female. In others, Nana Buluku is the ultimate creator, an androgynous deity who gave birth to the female Mawu and the male Lisa and passed the power over creation to them.

Many of the creation accounts tell of Mawu creating everything as she was carried from place to place on the back or in the mouth of Aido Hwedo, the rainbow serpent. The earth was created first, its curves, slopes and rises shaped by the winding, snaking motions of Aido Hwedo. Mountains formed from Aido Hwedo's excrement wherever they stopped to rest, leaving precious minerals inside. When Mawu finished, all of the mountains, trees, elephants and other creations left the world too heavy, so she asked Aido Hwedo to coil, to encircle the earth and rest underneath to support its weight.

Aido Hwedo holds his own tail in his mouth to hold fast to the earth, and rests in the cool of the seas which Mawu made for him to protect him from the heat. Mawu's son, Agbe, now commands them. Whenever Aido Hwedo shifts or readjusts his position, he causes an earthquake or tidal wave.
