= Num-Torum =

Supreme god of the Ugrian peoples

Num-Torum (Numi-Torem or Numi-Turum, (Нуми-То̄рум) "Upper God") is the supreme god or father god of the Ob-Ugrian peoples. He is the father of the hero Mir-Susne-Hum (Мир-Суснэ-Хум), six other sons, including Postajankt-iki, and one daughter. His siblings are Hotel-Ekva (Хо̄тал-Э̄ква) (Sun), Etposzojka (Э̄тпос-О̄йка) (Moon), Naj-Ekva (Най-Э̄ква) (Fire), Kuly-Otir (Куль-О̄тыр) (Underworld) and his wife, Kaltes-Ekwa (Калтэс-Э̄ква). According to the Khanty people, he lives on the highest level of heaven, which means that it is difficult for people to talk to him, thus the children of Num-Torum are consulted on his behalf. He and his seven sons lived in a house of gold and silver.

== External links and references ==
- "A rise of Mir-Susne-Hum." Graphic cycle dedicated to a national Ob-Ugrian (Ostyak - Hant and Vogul - Mansi) hero.
- World view of the Hanti
