= Xolas =

Xolas is the supreme deity of the Kawésqar of Tierra del Fuego. They are said to place the soul into every body at birth, and receive it back after death to await rebirth.
