= Baluba religion =

Traditional religion of the Baluba people

The Baluba are one of the Bantu peoples of Central Africa. Their creator deity's name is Kabezya-Mpungu. The Baluba people are also known as the Luba people.

== Important religious figures ==
Its adherents believe in the universal creator named Shakapanga. They also believe in three specific figures that make up the supernatural world. These figures include Leza, the supreme god, mikishi or bavidye which are various spirits, and bankambo which are people's ancestors. They also believe that there are three main figures in the living world. These figures include kitobo or nsengha which is a priest, the nganga which is a healer, and the mfwintshi also known as the witch or the embodiment of evil.

== Religious activities ==
Some of the common religious practices include praying, singing religious songs, dancing, sacrificing, offerings, and a variety of rituals. Adherents also believe in the interpretation of dreams.

== Creation myth of Kabezya-Mpungu ==
The Baluba creation story makes a connection between God's invisibility or unavailability and the endowment of humans with a soul or divine component longing for God.

In the creation story, Kabezya-Mpungu decides to become invisible after creating the world and the first humans who did not yet have a heart. After balancing the rain, sun, moon, and darkness, he leaves. To replace the visible god, he sends the people Mutshima ("heart"), the life-giving or divine part of humans.

..I don't want that humans will see me any more. I return into myself and send Mutshima...Then Kabeza-Mpungu disappeared. Thereafter, the heart appeared, in a small, hand-sized vessel. The heart cried and turned towards Sun, Moon, Darkness and Rain: "Kabezya-Mpungu, our father, where is he!" "Father is gone, we don't know the way he went". "Oh how much I am longing to see him" the heart replied, "to talk to him. Since I cannot find him, I will enter into this man. So I will wander from generation to generation".

Since then all humans have been endowed with Mutshima, the heart.
