= Mandé creation narrative =

Origin story of the Mandinka of Mali

The Mandé creation narrative is the traditional creation myth of the Mandinka of southern Mali.

== Oral tradition ==
The story begins when Mangala, the creator god, tries making a balaza seed but it failed. Then he made two eleusine seeds of different kinds, which the people of the Keita clan amongst the Mandinka call "the egg of the world in two twin parts which were to procreate". Then Mangala made three more pairs of seeds, and each pair became the four elements, the four directions, as corners in the framework of the world's creation. This he folded into a hibiscus seed. The twin pairs of seeds, which are seen as having opposite sex, are referred to as the egg or placenta of the world. This egg held an additional two pairs of twins, one male and one female, who were the archetype of people.

=== The twins ===
Among them was Pemba who wished to dominate and so he left the egg early, ripping a piece of his placenta. Pemba fell through space and his torn placenta became the earth. Because he left the egg prematurely the earth formed from this piece was arid and barren and of no use to Pemba. So Pemba tried to return to the egg, to rejoin his twin and his place in the rest of the placenta. But it was not to be found-Mangala had changed the remaining placenta into the sun. So Pemba stole male seeds from Mangala's clavicle, and took them to the barren earth and planted them there. Only one of them could germinate in the dry earth, a male eleusine seed which grew in the blood of the placenta. But because Pemba had stolen the seed and it germinated in Pemba's own placenta, the earth became impure and the eleusine seed turned red.

Faro, the other male twin, who had assumed the form of twin fish, was sacrificed to atone for Pemba and purify the earth. Faro was cut into sixty pieces which fell to the earth where they became trees. Mangala restored Faro to life giving him now the form of a human, and sent him down to earth in an ark made from his placenta. With him came four pairs of male and four pairs of female twins who became the original ancestors of mankind, all made from Faro's placenta. The ark also held all the animals and plants, which also carried the male and female life force. Sourakata followed with the first sacred drum made of the sacrificed Faro's skull which he played to bring rain. When the rain did not come, the ancestral smith came to earth and with his hammer, he struck a rock and then the rain came.

Faro created all the world that mankind has come to know from the descendants of Mangala's original egg seeds. He caused the land to flood to wash away the impure seed of his brother, Pemba. From this flood, only the good were saved, sheltered by Faro's ark.
