= Kaltas-Ekwa =

Ugrian moon goddess

In Ob-Ugrian mythology (i.e., mythology of Khanty and Mansi peoples), Kaltas-Ekwa (Russian: Калтась-эква) was the mother of the hero Mir-Susne-Hum and the wife of the god Num-Torum, who defeated her in heaven. She was also a goddess of the moon associated with the month April; a birth giving goddess (she is called upon by women in child-birth); goddess of fate; goddess of dawn and a shape-shifter, often shown manifested as a hare.

Vladimir Napolskikh and Sergey Belykh suggest that the name is a borrowing from the goddess name Kyldys-in of neighboring peoples and draw a parallel with Kyldysin, Udmurt deity of agriculture, fertility and newborns.
