= Kingdom of Niumi =

Former West African nation

- pre-1600–1897
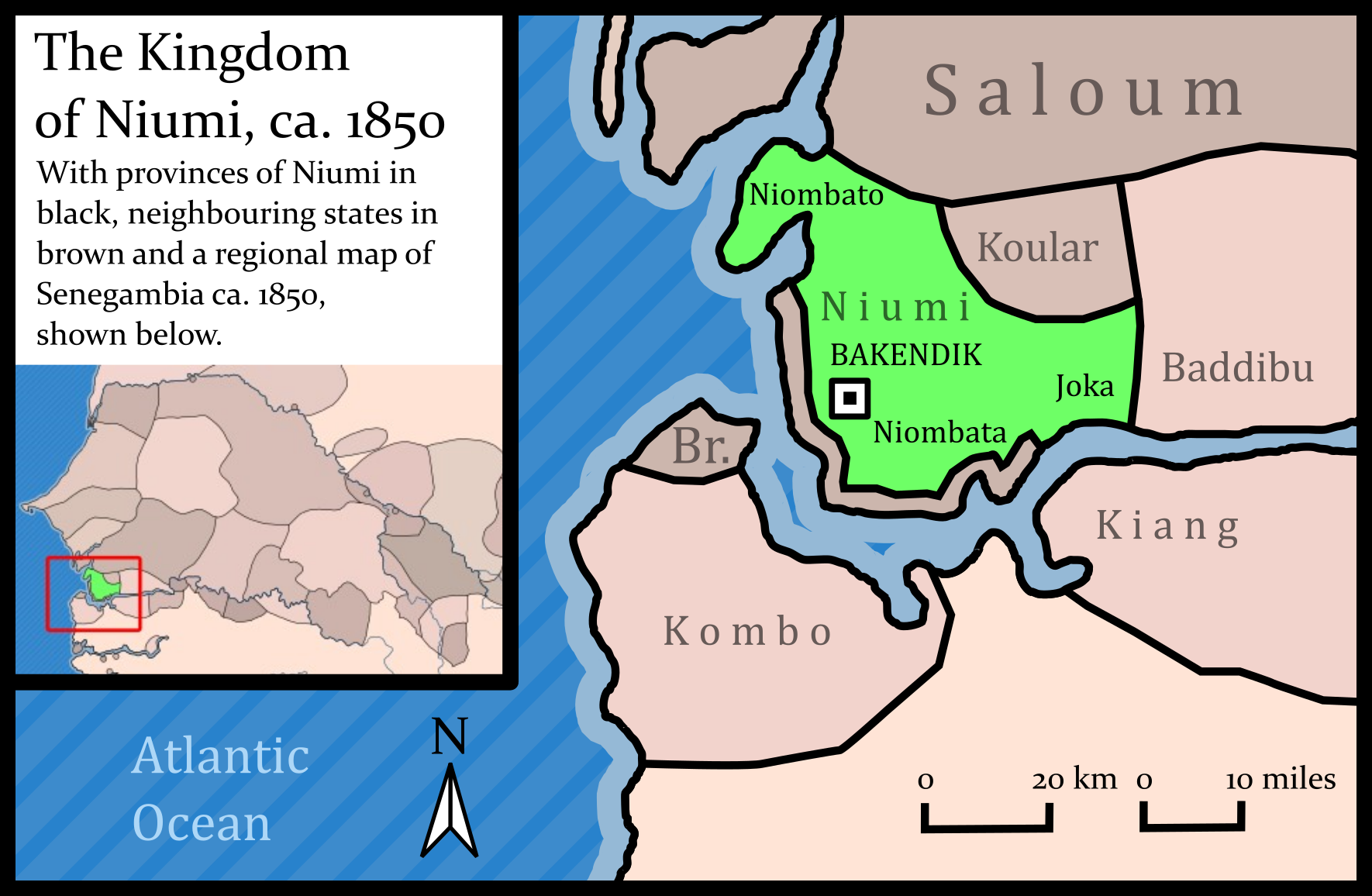
- Niumi ca. 1850
- Capital: Bakendik/Berending (ca. 1850)
- Common languages: Arabic, Fula, Mandinka, Portuguese (to 1800), Serer, Wolof
- Religion: Traditional African religion, Islam
- Government: Monarchy
- King (Mansa)
  - to 1686: Jenung Wuleng Sonko
  - 1883–1910: Maranta Sonko
- History
  - Established: pre-1600
  - The Ceded Mile surrendered to British Gambia: June 9, 1826
  - Protectorate treaty signed with British Gambia: January 1897
- Currency: cloth, silver coins (large denomination); beads (small denomination)
Preceded by	Succeeded by
Mali Empire; Jolof Empire	French Senegal; Gambia Colony and Protectorate
- Today part of: Senegal, The Gambia

The Kingdom of Niumi, also known as the Kingdom of Barra, was a West African nation at the Gambia River. Niumi was located at the mouth of the river, and extended nearly 60 kilometres (40 mi) along and north of its north bank. For much of its existence, its eastern border was occupied by the Kingdom of Baddibu, and its northern border was open savanna leading to Senegal. Formally becoming part of the Gambia Colony and Protectorate in 1897, the Kingdom now forms the Upper Niumi and Lower Niumi districts of the North Bank Division in The Gambia.

== Etymology and terminology ==
The first written record of the name ‘Niumi’ was in 1455/1456 by Venetian explorer Alvise Cadamosto, who recorded ‘Gnumimenssa’, or in other words ‘Niumi Mansa’ or King of Niumi. In Diogo Gomes’s voyage, the name ‘Nomyans’ is recorded. In old French writings, the ‘Ny’ is written as ‘Gn’, for instance with ‘Gnomy’ on Delisle's map of 1726. Locally, inhabitants refer to two areas – Niumi Bato and Niumi Banta – the seaside and upland areas of Niumi respectively. According to sociologist David P. Gamble, Niumi is pronounced Nyoomi, with a long ‘O’, and was written this way by linguist Gordon Innes. Some people also pronounce it Nyuumi, with a ‘U’ sound. In government publications it is written as ‘Niumi’. The word 'Niumi' likely means 'shore.'

From the 17th century to the 1890s, the kingdom was also referred to as ‘Barra’. Barra was the first port on the north bank of the Gambia River. The name likely derives from the Portuguese term for a harbor entrance, but may also originate from the word ‘bar’ (French: barre), as a bar of shifting sand was characteristic to other river mouths in the region, such as in Senegal. When the Protectorate was established in 1897, the word ‘Niumi’ came back into use.

== History ==
=== Early history ===
The earliest inhabitants of Niumi were likely shellfish gatherers and fishermen on the coast, possibly related to the modern-day Serer and Mandinka, after the rise of sine more Mandinka known as Guelwarrs moved into the area, establishing villages on the seafront and river banks in the 12th to 13th century. The Jamme clan from Badibu founded first the town of Bakendik, and then later the town of Sitanunku. The first rulers of Niumi were said to be Queens, but the first King was Samake Jamme. It is said that Samake took over after travelling with a group of other Mandinka rulers from the Gambia to the Emperor of Mali to seek legitimacy for their rule.

In early history, a substantial salt trade began with the interior. The rulers of the towns of Siin and Saalum gained great wealth from this trade. The kingdom also possessed large numbers of canoes for trade with the interior and the transport of warriors. Early Mandinka states, such as Niumi, were expected to pay tribute to the nearby Serer and Wolof states. The next clan that settled in Niumi was a warrior family from Kaabu in the south, with the surname ‘Maane’. The Maane had conquered indigenous people on the south bank of the Gambia River, and settled at the town of Brufut. However, some travelled across the river, likely to help the Jamme fight off Serer and Wolof aggressors. The Maane shared the kingship with the Jamme and founded towns of Kanuma and Bunyadu.

Finally, the third major clan arrived, called the ‘Sonko’. The origin of the Sonko is unclear. One account says they were Mandinka warriors led by Amari Sonko, another that they were related to the Sonko Yabu clan who lived on the south bank in the middle of the Gambia River, and another that they were originally Fula and descended from Koli Tenguella. The latter tradition is likely a later invention to bolster the legitimacy of Sonko kings of Niumi. At first, the Sonko settled on the borders of Siin and Saalum and collected taxes for the Serer and Wolof rulers, but they later decided to help the Jamme and Maane in their struggle. They founded the towns of Berending and Jifet. The family at Jifet later split to Essau and Sika. This consolidation of power by the three royal clans was likely complete by the beginning of the 16th century.

The seven towns of the three major clans then shared the rulership of Niumi in rotation. David P. Gamble establishes this as follows:

Rotation of Rulers in Niumi
Town	Clan	No. of Rulers
Bakendik	Jamme	10
Kanuma	Maane	9
Sitanunku	Jamme	8
Essau Jelenkunda	Sonko	9
Bunyadu	Maane	7
Essau-Mansaring Su	Sonko	8
Berending	Sonko	8

=== Early European trade and settlement ===
The first interaction with Europeans happened in 1446. A Portuguese attack was repelled in 1446. Trade relations would be opened between Portugal and Niumi once decade later.

Though there were early interactions with European traders and explorers, the first attempt to settle in Niumi came in the mid-1600s. In 1651, the Courlanders visited an island off the coast of Niumi, called Dog Island. They called the island Honde-Eylat and made a petition to the King of Niumi to work on the island. However, they later decided to build a fort further up the river at an island not in the possession of Niumi, called St Andrew's Island. In the 1660s, the English made a temporary fortification on Dog Island, renaming it Charles Island. After St Andrew's Island fell into the hands of the English in 1662, and renamed James Island, their main garrison remained on Charles Island until 1666.

In 1678, a Frenchman named Ducasse established a small post on Charles Island, but he and his men were shortly after killed by the natives. Gamble relates that this was because the island was sacred to the residents of Sitanunku, one of the seven royal villages of Niumi. In 1681, the French established a more permanent trading factory at Albreda on the mainland.

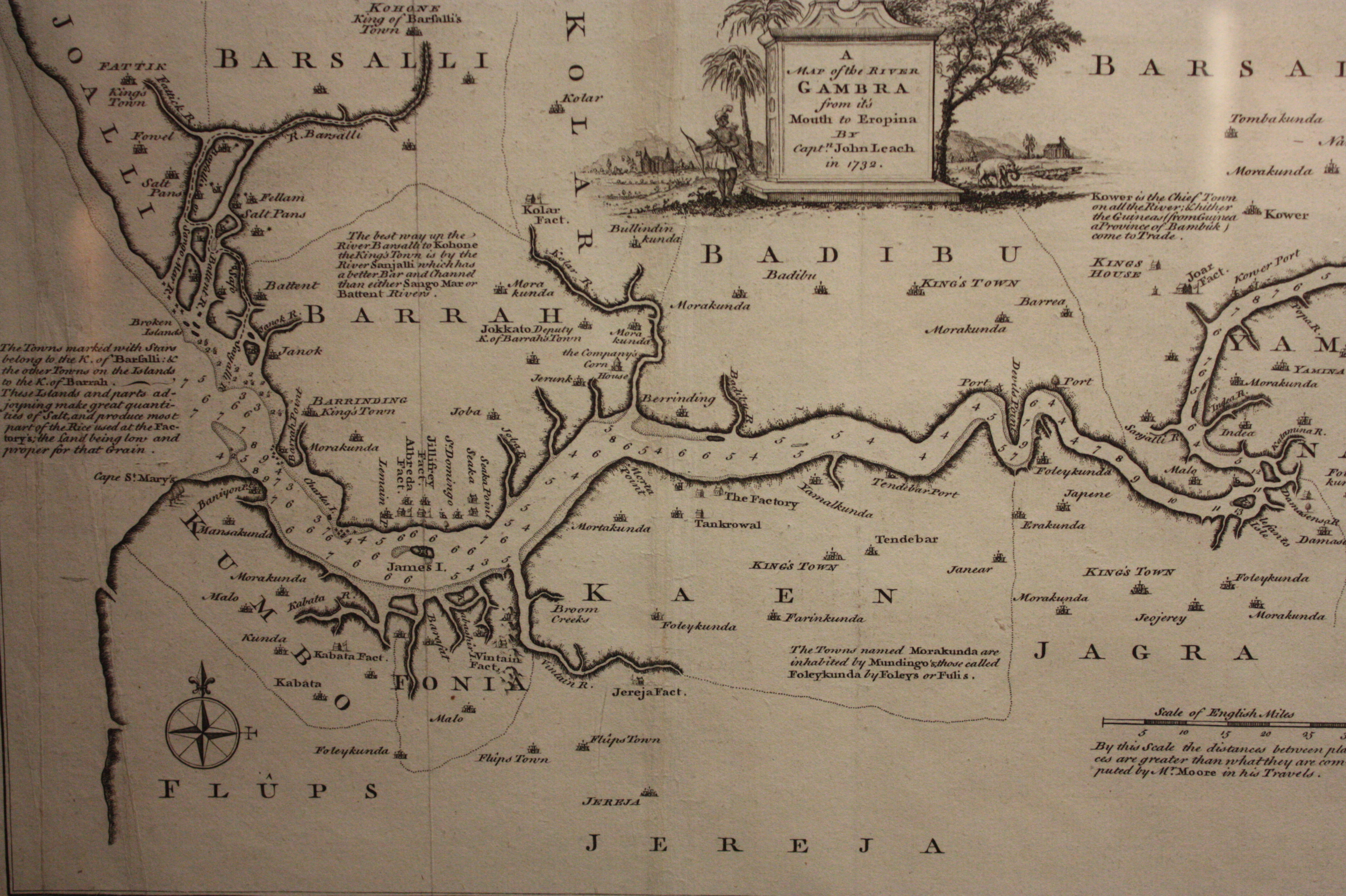
Map of the states of the River Gambia in 1732 by Captain John Leach, depicting Niumi as 'Barrah'.

During most of the 18th century Niumi prospered from its advantageous position astride trade routes. The kings extended their control over Niumi Bato to the north towards the Saloum Delta, as well as east into Jokadu.

=== 19th century ===
At the beginning of the 19th century, the King of Niumi was considered "more formidable to Europeans than any other chieftain on the river." Each vessel that passed was required to pay £20. These duties were often collected in person by the Alkaid, or Governor, of Jillifree. Revenues were declining in tandem with the Atlantic slave trade, however, with 'legitimate' trade failing to fill the gap. To make matters worse for the Niuminka rulers, in 1816 the British founded Bathurst on the opposite bank of the Gambia and began actively suppressing the slave trade.

==== Ceded Mile and Barra War ====
The King of Niumi who was crowned in 1823 was Burungai Sonko. He was known to be opposed to the British. He levied considerable fees on Bathurst merchants who operated in Niumi, and in 1823 turned down a British request to install a battery of guns on the shore opposite Bathurst. Despite this, the British persisted, and under the threat of the British frigate HMS Maidstone, Burungai signed a treaty in 1826 handing over the Ceded Mile to the British. A fort was immediately founded at Barra Point, called Fort Bullen, named after Commodore Charles Bullen of the Maidstone. The Ceded Mile was 1 mi (1.6 km) wide, and 58 km (36 mi) long, extending from Boonyadoo Creek at the mouth of the Gambia River to Junkarda Creek. A small portion of this was reserved at Albreda, where the French had established a factory. The agreement that Burungai signed relinquished all Niumi claims to sovereignty over the river as well as on the territory of the Ceded Mile. In return, the British agreed to pay 400 dollars a year.

During this period a number of factors were squeezing the Niumian economy. The establishment of Fort Bullen served to suppress the sources of income that Niumi had previously relied on, i.e. the slave trade and duties levied on slave trading ships who passed into the Gambia River. The British reduced their payments to Niumi as they deemed their merchants were being treated poorly. They were also establishing new factories upriver, which reduced the power of the middle-men in Barra.

In 1831 an English agricultural society sought to create a settlement for liberated slaves and pensioners on Dog Island, but these settlers were chased out on August 20 due to the sacred nature of the land.

The next day, after years of progressive British encroachment, the Barra War broke out. The spark was supposedly lit when two Niumi men entered Fort Bullen, drunk and with cutlasses, and demanded to be served. When the canteen keeper refused to serve them, one of them fired a musket at him but missed. The British sent a party after these two men the next day, but with the tense political environment a large crowd gathered in front of the fort. After a day-long battle in which the small colonial settlement near the fort was destroyed, the British troops evacuated Fort Bullen, leaving the Niuminka once again in charge of this strategic point commanding the river's mouth.

Believing an attack on Bathurst to be imminent, the British called for help. French forces from Goree as well as marines from Sierra Leone reinforced the British. The forces of Niumi further fortified Barra point. Finally in November the British retook Fort Bullen, and in January 1832 signed a peace with the Niumimansa confirming the land cession. In the years after this setback, trade in beeswax and hides increased, but the Niumi ruling elite could not tax it and so looked for alternative sources of income.

==== Jokadu Revolution ====
In the 1840s Jokadu rebelled against the increasingly predatorial leaders of Niumi. Niumimansa Demba Sonko recruited the famous Mandinka warrior Kelefa Saane, the subject of a popular griot song in modern times, to help suppress the revolt. He also hired a force of 700 Serahuli mercenaries. Their leader, Ansumana Jaju, married one of Demba's daughters and sought further power for himself. However, the people turned against Ansumana and in 1856 civil war broke out. To prevent a massacre of the Serahulis, the British Governor arranged a truce and sent the force up the river to Fattatenda in order to remove them from danger.

==== Marabout Invasion ====
After the death of Demba Sonko in 1862, there was an interregnum before his successor, Buntung Jamme, succeeded to the throne. In much of the region at this time there were wars raging between the Soninke pagans and the Marabout Muslims. One of Marabout chief Maba Diakhou Ba's captains, a Wolof called Amer Faal, took the opportunity to invade Niumi. He overran Jokadu, forcing the local ruler to convert to Islam. Faal made his way across Niumi, and Maba, learning of this, gathered a force to follow him. The new King of Niumi took refuge in Bathurst, but the headmen of Berending and Essau prepared to make a stand against the Marabouts. They sent word to the British Governor, George Abbas Kooli D'Arcy, to ask for his aid. The Governor was determined to remain neutral, but agreed to evacuate Albreda and protect women and children at Fort Bullen.

The Niumi forces abandoned Berending and agreed to focus their forces at Essau, which had strong stockades. Berending was destroyed. In response to a request from D'Arcy, Maba agreed not to attack the Niumi in Essau. He did not wish to agitate the Governor as he relied on Bathurst for shipments of guns and ammunition. D'Arcy met with both factions to arrange peace, but the truce was soon broken. Maba captured the cattle belonging to the Niumi royal family, and on his retreat left them with Amer Faal. The people of Essau set out to recapture the cattle, but in February 1863 D'Arcy organised another truce.

The Ceded Mile was subsequently flooded with Wolof and Serer refugees from lands that Maba had devastated. They were given the site of Kanuma, that had previously been destroyed, and the town of Bantang Kiling, which was renamed Fitzgerald Town. Later the town was raided by Amer Faal, who stole their cattle. D'Arcy could not settle the dispute by negotiation, and so launched a punitive expedition against Faal's town of Tubab Kolong in July 1866. In this, he was assisted by Niumi forces from Essau. After victory in the Battle of Tubab Kolong, the Niumi forces went on to burn the primarily Muslim villages of Lamin, Albreda, Jufure, and Sika.

==== Loss of Independence ====
The loss of Niumi's independence would come from outside events. The Berlin Conference of 1884 began a process of carving up Africa under European control. This process reached the Gambia region in 1889 when the French and British outlined their territorial claims.

The ensuing The Gambia–Senegal border would split Niumi in two. The areas awarded to Frence were delineated in 1891 and ceded in 1893. The Mansa of Niumi, Maranta, accepted the loss of his northern territories without protest. In 1896, he would ask the British for protection, which was granted in Janutary 1897. Thereafter, Maranta became the first "head chief" of what was formerly Niumi.

== Geography and economy ==
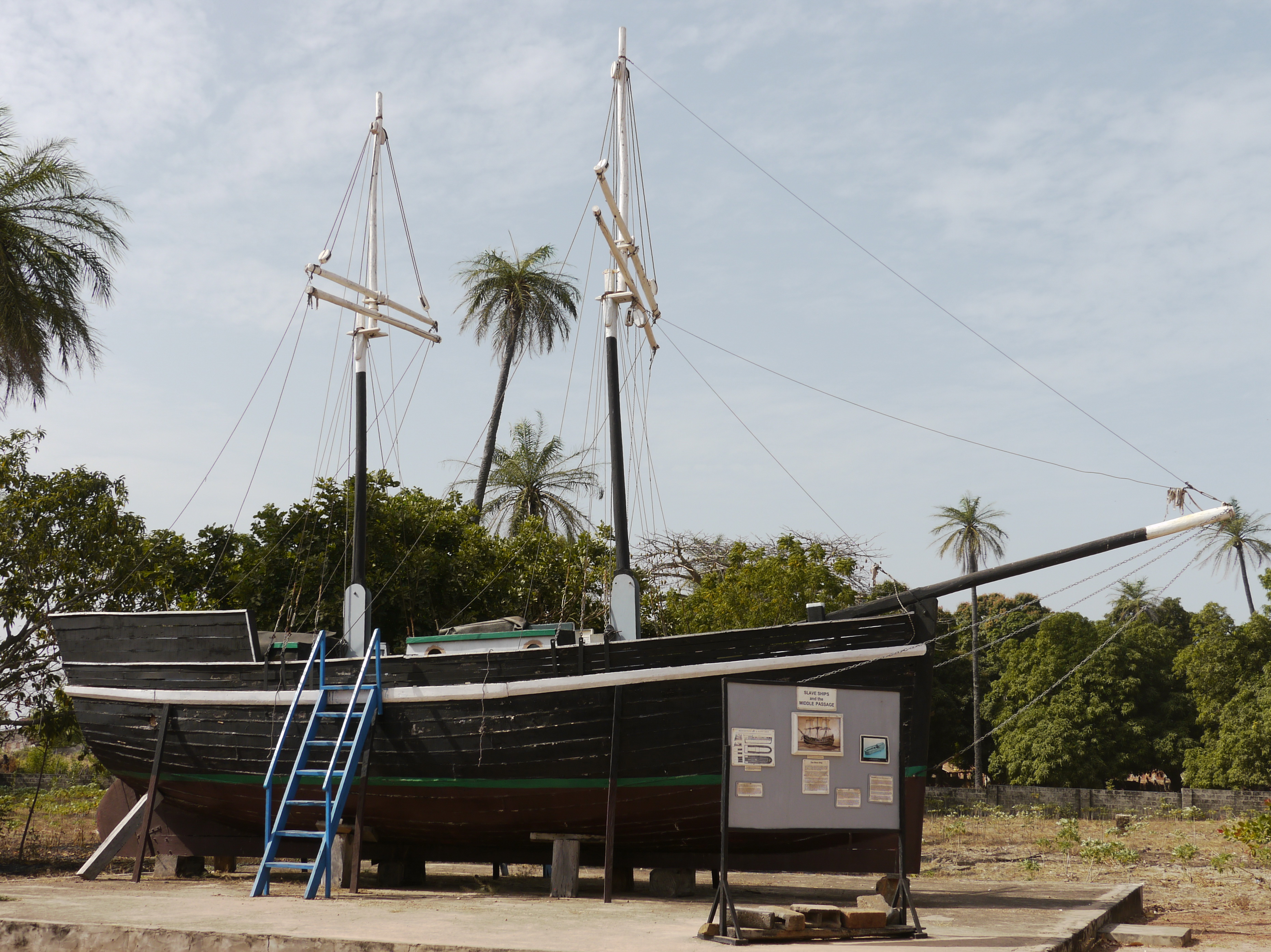
A reconstruction of a slave ship in Albreda.

Niumi lay in open savanna which provided pasturage and dry sandy soil for groundnut production. Baddibu, its eastern neighbor, was one of the richest groundnut-producing areas on the Gambia River, but lacked suitable river transportation. As Niumi had one of the few stretches of river frontage on the Gambia not choked by mangrove swamps, important land and water routes intersected with the kingdom. The elite of Niumi were active traders, and also profited from charging tolls to passing merchants and resident Europeans.

Niumi had a long trading history owing to its favorable geographical position. It had been a source of salt for people to the east and south-east. By the 18th century, it became a centre for the Atlantic slave trade. Slaves carrying ivory, beeswax, hides, and hold were marched down the river from Wuli and other states to the east for trade at the Niumi ports of Jillifree or Albreda. They were placed on British or French ships and bound for the West Indies. With the enforcement of the ban on the slave trade, by the 1840s trade had shifted to the export of groundnuts.

The Niuminka adopted European style square sails. They modified the hull of the pirogue in order to implement the use of a mast rigged with one or more sails. European style tillers and rudders were utilised, although smaller vessels retained the use of steering paddles. This allowed for sailing to sea and travelling across rivers.

== Rulers ==
=== Mansa of Niumi ===
The King of Niumi was known as the Mansa in Mandinka. In 1840, the British Governor of the Gambia Henry Vere Huntley estimated that the average reign of a ruler was five years. This was because the next town in line for the throne would attempt to shorten his life, and that poison would be subtly introduced into the diet of the reigning king. Excessive alcohol was often used to this end. Also, when a ruler was incompetent a regent could be appointed.

=== List of known rulers ===
First names	Clan	Dates	Capital	Events
Jenung Wuleng	Sonko	–1686	Berending	
Almaranta	Sonko	–1717	Essau	
Dusu Koli	Sonko	c. 1725 – May 1736	Berending	
Siranka Wali	Jamme	July 1736 – 1750	Bakindiki	
Jelali Kasa	Maane	1751–1754	Kanuma	
Sambari Naja	Jamme	June 1754 – Dec. 1759	Sitanunku	
Nandanko Suntu	Sonko	1760 – c. 1776	Essau	
Nyiti Soma Jamme	Sonko	1783–	Essau	
Tamba Jabunai	Sonko	1786–	Berending	
Koli Manka Jambung Jiti	Maane	1815–1823	Bunyadu	Ceded Mile Treaty 1823
Burungai Jeriandi	Sonko	1823 – June 1833	Essau	Barra War 1831–32
Demba Adama	Sonko	1834–1862	Berending	
Buntung Saane Sonko	Jamme	1862 – Jan. 1867	Bakindiki	Marabout Invasion 1862–66
Mamadi Sira Madi Jamme	Maane	1867 – c. 1875	Kanuma	
Wali	Jamme	c. 1875 – June 1883	Sitanunku	
Maranta	Sonko	1883–1910	Essau	Protectorate Treaty 1897
Mfamara	Sonko	1906–1911	Essau-Gilenkunda	

== Notes ==
=== Sources ===
- Gamble, David P. (April 1999). "The North Bank of the Gambia: Place, People, and Population: (C) The Nyoomi, Jookadu, and Badibu Districts" (PDF). Gambian Studies. 38.
- Park, Mungo (2002) [1799]. Travels in the Interior of Africa. London: Wordsworth.
- Quinn, Charlotte A. (October 1968). "Niumi: A Nineteenth-Century Mandingo Kingdom". Africa: Journal of the International African Institute. 38 (4): 443–455. doi:10.2307/1157876. JSTOR 1157876. S2CID 146778747.
- Mbaeyi, P. M. (1967). "The Barra-British War of 1831: A Reconsideration of ITS Origins and Importance". Journal of the Historical Society of Nigeria. 3 (4): 617–31. JSTOR 41856904.
- Wright, Donald R (1987). "The Epic of Kalefa Saane as a guide to the Nature of Precolonial Senegambian Society-and Vice Versa" (PDF). History in Africa. 14: 287–309. doi:10.2307/3171842. JSTOR 3171842. S2CID 162851641.
- Wright, Donald (2018). The World and a Very Small Place in Africa. A History of Globalization in Niumi, the Gambia. London: Routledge.
