= Bakindick Mandinka =

Bakindik
- Interactive map of Bakindik
- Country: Gambia
- Division: North Bank Division
- District: Lower Niumi

Population (2008)
  - Total: 1,801

Bakindik is a town in western Gambia. It is located in the Lower Niumi District in the North Bank Division. As of 2008, it has an estimated population of 1,801.

== History ==
Bakindik was founded by a Mandinka warrior named Sora Musa Jammeh, who also founded Tambana in Jokadu and Illiasa. The town was the seat of one branch of the Jammeh lineage, which alternated the kingship of Niumi with the Sonko and Manneh lineages, and so was periodically the capital of the kingdom.

== Location and Geography ==
Bakindik is located at approximately 13.492917° N latitude and -16.090472° W longitude. The town has an elevation of about 17.28 meters (56.69 feet) above sea level.
