= Upper Niumi =

Coordinates: 13°24′N 16°20′W

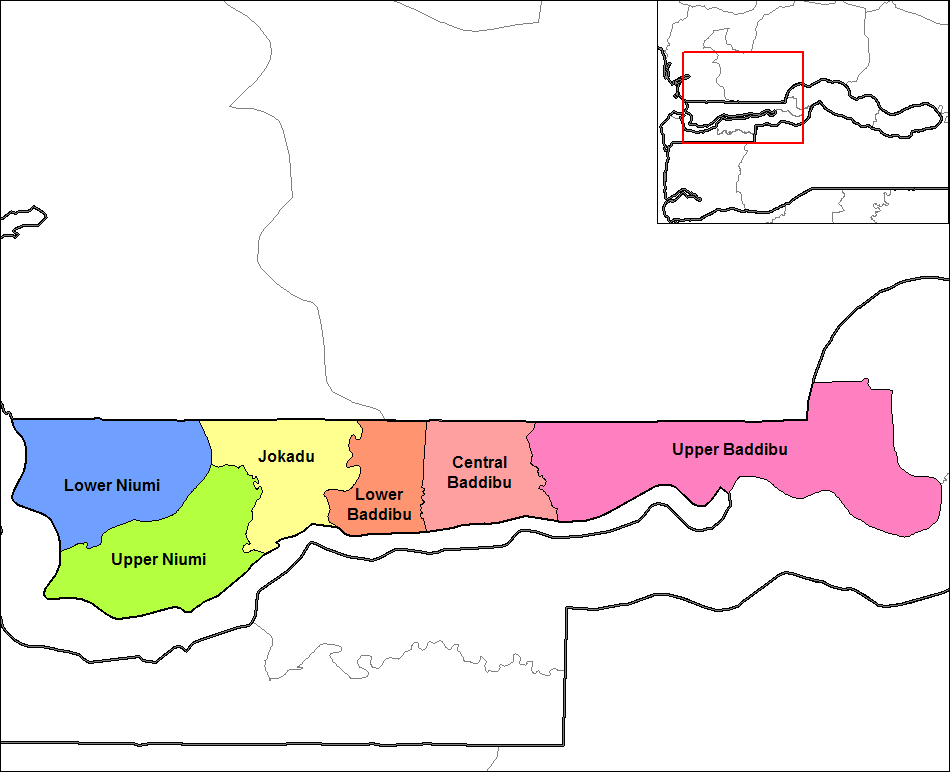
Districts of North Bank Division

Upper Niumi is one of the six districts of the North Bank Division of the Gambia which is located in West Africa The remaining five districts are: Lower Niumi, Jokadu, Lower Baddibu, Central Baddibu and Upper Baddibu.

== See also ==
- Aljamdu
