= Barra War =

Armed conflict

Date	1831–1832
Location	Kingdom of Niumi
Result	Inconclusive

Belligerents
British Empire	Kingdom of Niumi

Commanders and leaders
(British Empire) George Rendall (British Empire) Lt. Col. Hingston (British Empire) Cpt. Stewart; Lt. Cresey (British Empire) Ens. Fearon (British Empire) Lt. Leigh †	Burungai Sonko

Units involved
Royal African Corps; 1st and 2nd West India Regiments; Sierra Leone Militia; HMS Plumper	Barra troops Troops of other kingdoms

Strength
451	2500–3000

Casualties and losses
93 (killed and wounded)	

The Barra War, also known as the Anglo-Niumi War or the British-Barra War, was a military conflict that lasted from 1831 to 1832 between forces of the British Empire and the Kingdom of Niumi, in what is now The Gambia.

== Background ==
There were growing British-Niumi tensions for over a decade before the war broke out in 1831. After the founding of Bathurst in 1816, Alexander Grant told the King of Niumi (Niumimansa), Kollimanka Mane, that the British had no intention of "depriving him or his people of any of their rights and privileges." Despite this, Grant refused to pay the customs on captured slave ships that the Niumimansa demanded.

British traders and colonial administrators also attempted to establish a trading monopoly on the Gambia River. They progressively undermined the Niumimansa's customs revenue by negotiating lower rates, collecting customs through the British officers, and establishing posts upriver. This was an attempt to draw commerce away from French posts such as Bakel in the upper Senegal River, but also cut out Niumi middlemen. In 1823, Grant founded the settlement of Georgetown on MacCarthy Island, but the French still held their trading post at Albreda, which was described as a "very acute" challenge to British trade.

King Kollimanka Mane died in 1823, widely seen by the people of Niumi as having not been strong enough in the face of European pressure. He was succeeded by Burungai Sonko.

In 1826, the British used gunboat diplomacy to force Burungai to cede a mile's breadth of land on the north bank of the river. The British built Fort Bullen at Barra point in this 'Ceded Mile'. British merchants and officials also expanded elsewhere on the river, and in 1831 the British sought to settle on Niumi's Dog Island. Local tribes objected, so the governor suspended the monthly payment to Niumi for the possession of the Ceded Mile. In August 1831, the Niuminka drove the settlers off the island by force, and the King forbade his subjects going to Bathurst.

== Conflict ==
As tensions continued to rise, Ensign Fearon of the Royal African Colonial Corps, accompanied by 22 soldiers, 50 discharged soldiers, and a quickly-formed militia, were dispatched to Barra on 22 August 1831 in an attempt to alleviate the situation, but their presence only aggravated the tensions, leading to fighting breaking out.

Fearon was forced to withdraw to Fort Bullen and the Niumi forces advanced on the fort, completely encircling it. The next day, after losing 23 of his soldiers, Fearon evacuated the fort and retreated across the river to Bathurst. Following Fearon's defeat, neighbouring chiefs sent large contingents of men to reinforce the Niumimansa. Several thousand armed natives were collected only 5 kilometres (3 miles) from Bathurst. Lieutenant Governor sent an urgent dispatch to Sierra Leone for assistance, seeing the danger posed to the settlements.

The dispatch arrived on 1 October, and on 4 October a force under Captain Stewart of the 1st West India Regiment were dispatched. The force consisted of detachments from the 1st and 2nd West India Regiments, from the Sierra Leone Militia, and from the Royal African Corps. They sailed for The Gambia in HMS Plumper, a brig, and the Parmilia transport. On 9 November they arrived in The Gambia and found Fort Bullen still in the hands of the natives. They had chosen to fortify Barra point rather than taking Bathurst.

On 11 November Stewart's force landed at the point, consisting of 451 of all ranks. They were supported with heavy cover fire from the Plumper (under Lieutenant Cresey), the Parmilia, and an armed colonial schooner. The Mandinkas were estimated to be 2500-3000 strong and were protected from the gunfire by their entrenchments and the shelter of tall grass. They unleashed heavy fire on Stewart's force who were landing directly to their front. Stewart's force managed to break through, and after an hour of fighting, they were driven from their entrenchments at bayonet point and pursued them for some distance through the bush. The British lost two men in combat, with three officers and 47 other ranks wounded. Over the next few days, the British fortified Fort Bullen for a state of defense. At dawn on 17 November the British marched to attack Essau, leaving Fort Bullen in charge of the crew of the Plumper.

On approaching the town, the British deployed into line, and the guns from the Plumper opened fire on the stockade. This was kept up for five hours, and fire was returned vigorously from the town with small arms and artillery. The British fired rockets into the town, the first of which set fire to a house, but the rest had little impact. At noon, some of the Niumi troops left the rear of the town, and shortly afterwards a large force of Mandinkas appeared on the British right flank. A second force was also spotted making a detour around to their left flank, apparently with the intention of attacking their rear. Low on ammunition and with their artillery having made little effect on the stockade, the British retreated. They had suffered a loss of 11 killed and 59 wounded. Lieutenant Leigh of the Sierra Leone Militia, and five other men later died of their wounds.

On 7 December Lieutenant Colonel Hingston of the Royal African Corps arrived with reinforcements and assumed command of the British forces. With the increase in British strength, the King of Barra notified them of his desires to open negotiations. Terms being proposed which he accepted, a treaty was drawn up and signed at Fort Bullen on 4 January 1832, ending the war.

== Aftermath ==
In wake of the Barra War the Niumimansa's authority waned. Parts of Niumi broke away, and Islam penetrated more deeply than before. When conflict broke out between the Muslim marabouts and the traditional powers of Senegambia, the king relied on the British to maintain his position and turning Niumi into a protectorate.

== See also ==
- Military history of The Gambia
