= Illiasa =

- District
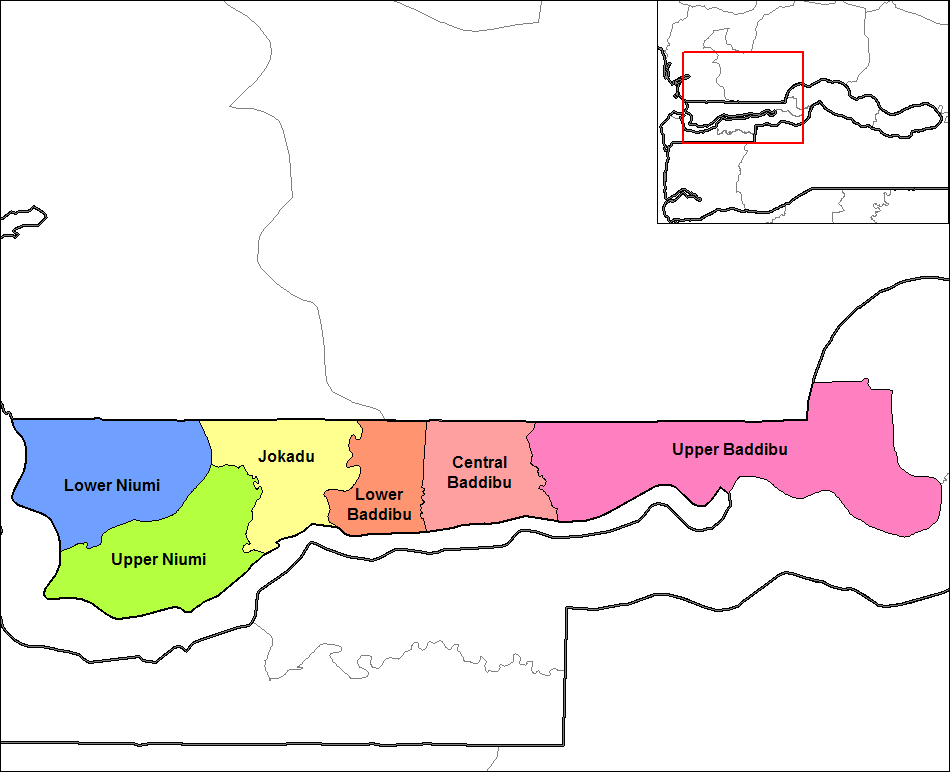
- The North Bank Division before the reorganization of 1996. Illiasa occupies the western part of Upper Baddibu.

- Location within The Gambia
- Coordinates: 13.56449°N 15.74963°W
- Country: The Gambia
- Division: North Bank Division

Illiasa or Elliasa is a village and one of the districts of the North Bank Division of The Gambia.

== History ==
Illiasa was founded by a Mandinka warrior Sora Musa Jammeh, who also founded Tambana in Jokadu and Bakendik, one of the royal villages of Niumi.

In the local government reforms of 1996, Illiasa district was created out of the former district of Upper Baddibu, along with Sabach Sanjal.
