= Dog Island, Gambia =

Island in Gambia

Coordinates: 13°21′50″N 16°30′37″W

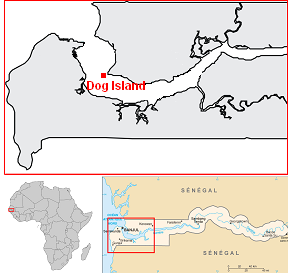
Dog Island location on the Gambia River

Dog Island, known in Mandinka as Jerre Kung Sito, is a small island, situated on the Gambia River in the Republic of the Gambia about 13 kilometres from the mouth of the river to the Atlantic Ocean. The area of the island is less than 3.5 hectares. During low tide the island is connected to the mainland, but during high tide it is separated by about 150 metres from the headland of Dog Island Point on the north bank of the river. The island is named after the sound made by the resident baboons, which from a distance sounds like dogs barking.

== History ==
Jerre Kung Sito was historically a religious site for the jalang (shrine) of the village of Sitanunku. Only the village elders were allowed to go there, and no one lived on the island.

In 1651, the Courlanders visited the island, which they called Honde-Eylat, and made a petition to the King of Niumi to set up there, but later decided to build a fort further up the river at St Andrew's Island.

In 1661, the English captain Robert Holmes arrived on behalf of the Royal African Company to establish an English presence in the Gambia river (and, less explicitly, to eject the Courlanders from the area). Holmes built the first English installation, a small fort on Dog island, which he named Charles Island, after King Charles I of England. It was the main English garrison until 1666.

In 1678, a Frenchman named Ducasse established a small post on Charles Island, but he and his men were shortly after killed by the locals for trespassing on their sacred land.

Francis Moore, in 1738, described Dog Island as being within a musket shot of the Niumi shore, and also related that the fort there was in ruins.

The island was mined for stone in the late 1810s when the British founded the town of Bathurst on the opposite side of the river.

In 1831 the Royal Agricultural Society of England attempted to settle freed slaves on the island to grow hemp, but were not given permission by the alkalo of Sitanunku. They rebuffed him and settled anyway, whereupon the young men of the village threatened to destroy the farms there. Within a few weeks the settlers had been driven off, raising tensions that helped precipitate the Barra War.

Currently, tourists are occasionally ferried from Banjul to Dog Island to observe the dolphins swimming in the Gambia River estuary.
