= Lohen Forest Park =

Forest park in The Gambia

- IUCN category IV (habitat/species management area)
- Interactive map of Lohen Forest Park
- Location: North Bank Division Gambia
- Nearest city: Barra
- Coordinates: 13°32′30″N 16°21′51″W
- Area: 85 ha (210 acres)
- Established: January 1, 1954

Lohen Forest Park is a forest park in the Gambia. Established on January 1, 1954, it covers 85 hectares.

== Geography ==
The park's elevation is approximately 40 meters above sea level, and it is geographically positioned at latitude 13°32'30"N and longitude 16°21'51"W.
