= Military history of the Gambia =

The military history of The Gambia spans from the earliest colonial contact in the 1500s through to the present day. Although it is currently one of the least militarized countries in the world, The Gambia has seen various colonial conflicts, and has contributed soldiers to Britain in World War I and World War II as part of the Gambia Regiment. Since independence in 1965, The Gambia has experienced various peacekeeping operations, as well as the 1994 military coup d'état and the 2017 ECOWAS military intervention.

== 1831 Barra War ==
In August 1831, disturbances were reported among the Mandinka people living in the vicinity of Fort Bullen and Barra Point. Ensign Fearon of the Royal African Corps was instructed by Lieutenant Governor George Rendall to investigate the disturbances. Fearon proceeded on 22 August with 30 Royal African Corps soldiers and a few pensioner to the town of Essau, the capital of Barra, to demand hostages from their king. At Essau, Fearon's force was attacked by a large body of the Barra king's troops, and was forced to withdraw to Fort Bullen. The Barra soldiers advanced on the fort, completely surrounding it from the land side. The next day, Fearon having lost 23 of his soldiers, evacuated the fort and retired to Bathurst, across the river. Following Fearon's defeat, neighbouring chiefs sent large contingents of men to reinforce the King of Barra's soldiers. Several thousand armed natives were collected only three miles from Bathurst, and with the settlement in such imminent danger, the Lieutenant Governor sent an urgent dispatch to Sierra Leone for assistance.

The dispatch arrived on 1 October, and on 4 October a force under Captain Stewart of the 1st West India Regiment was dispatched. The force consisted of detachments from the 1st and 2nd West India Regiments, from the Sierra Leone Militia, and from the Royal African Corps. They sailed for The Gambia in HMS Plumper, a brig, and the Parmilia transport. On 9 November they arrived in The Gambia and found Fort Bullen still in the hands of the natives. Fortunately, they had confined themselves to making demonstrations rather than taking Bathurst, which lay entirely at their mercy.

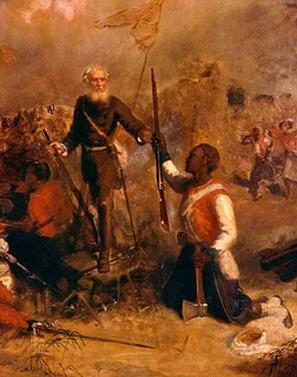
Samuel Hodge winning a Victoria Cross, 1866.

On 11 November, Stewart's force landed at Barra Point, consisting of 451 of all ranks. They were supported with heavy cover fire from the Plumper (under Lieutenant Cresey), the Parmilia, and an armed colonial schooner. The Mandinkas were estimated at 2500-3000 strong and were skilfully covered from the gunfire by their entrenchments and by the shelter of the high grass. They sustained heavy fire upon Stewart's force who were landing directly in their front. Despite this, the British pushed on, and after an hour's hard fighting, during which the Mandinkas contested every inch of ground, they succeeded in driving them from their entrenchments at bayonet point and pursued them for some distance through the bush. The British lost two men in this action, with three officers and 47 other ranks wounded. Over the next few days, the British focused on landing the guns and placing Fort Bullen in a state of defence. At daybreak on 17 November, the British marched to attack Essau, leaving Fort Bullen in the charge of the crew of the Plumper.

On approach to the town, the British deployed into line, and the guns from the Plumper opened fire on the stockade. This was kept up for five hours, and was fire was returned just as vigorously from the town with small arms and artillery. The British fired rockets into the town, the first of which set fire to a house, but the rest had little impact due to precautions taken by the King of Barra's troops. At noon, some of them left the rear of the town, and shortly afterwards a very large force of Mandinkas appeared on the British right flank. A second force was also spotted making a detour around to their left flank, apparently with the intention of attacking their rear. The British ammunition running low, and the artillery having made little impact on the stockade, the British decided to retreat to Benty Point. They had suffered a loss of 11 killed and 59 wounded. Lieutenant Leigh of the Sierra Leone Militia, and five other men later died of their wounds.

On 7 December, Lieutenant Colonel Hingston of the Royal African Corps arrived with reinforcements and assumed command of the British forces. Upon realising the increase in British strength, the King of Barra notified them of his desire to open negotiations. Terms being proposed which he accepted, a treaty was drawn up and signed at Fort Bullen on 4 January 1832, ending the war.

== Storming of Sabbajee ==
In February 1852, Major Luke Smythe O'Connor was appointed as officer commanding the British soldiers in West Africa. Initially based in Sierra Leone, in September that year he was appointed Governor of the Gambia, and so moved the headquarters for British troops in West Africa to The Gambia.

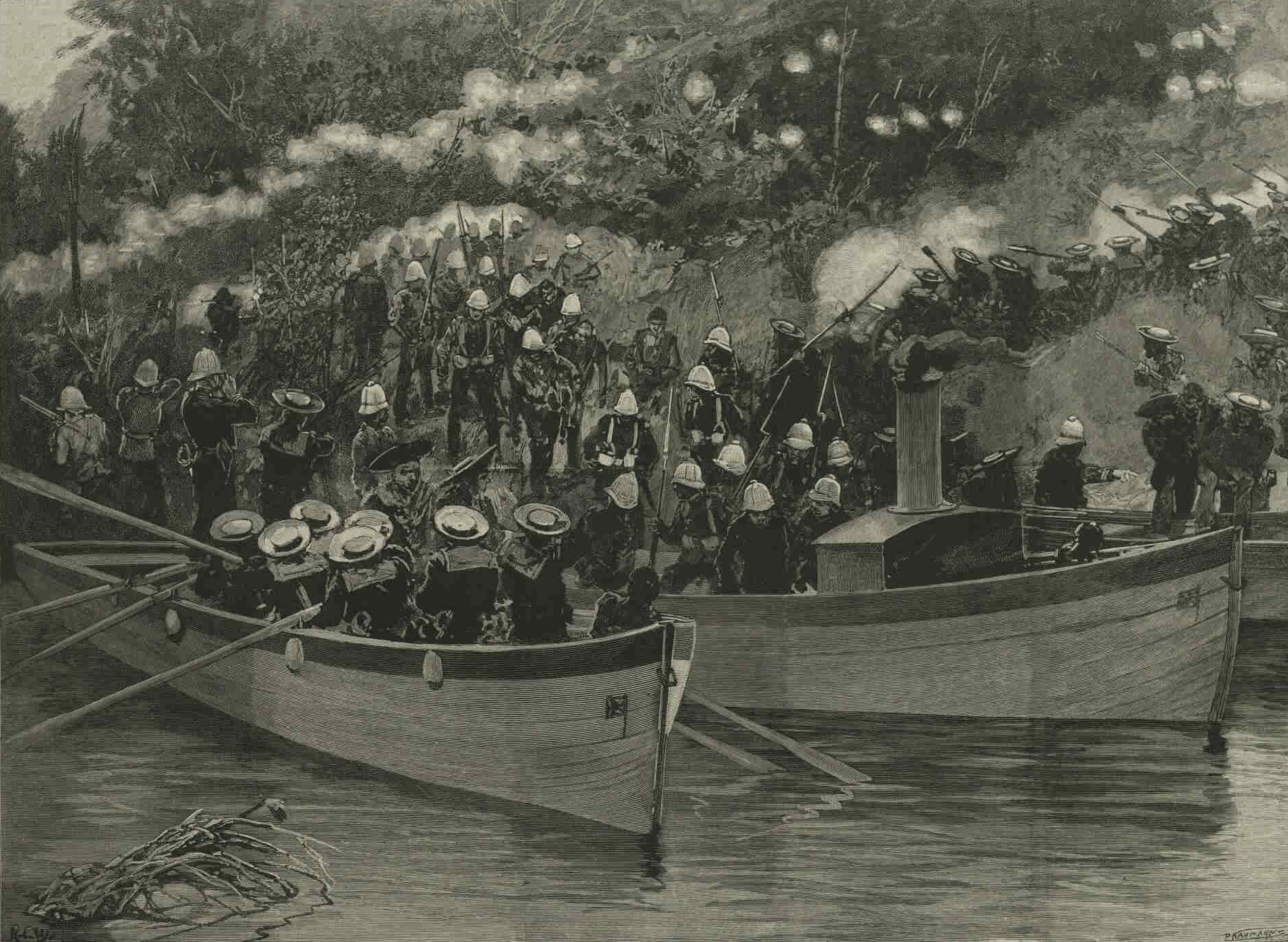
Drawing of the Madini Creek ambush in 1894.

== Second World War ==
Following World War I, the armed forces of the British West African colonies were put under the control of their respective colonial governments. An Inspector General of African Colonial Forces was appointed to oversee their training and advise the colonial governments. At the outbreak of war in September 1939, The Gambia was only defended by the Gambia Company, officially part of the Sierra Leone Battalion. HQ Military Forces West Africa was formed on 7 July 1940, and Lieutenant General George Giffard was its first General Officer Commanding. His headquarters was established near Accra and his task was to ensure the defence of all West African territories and coordination of military resources in the West African colonies.

The first Commanding Officer Gambia Area was appointed on 19 December 1940, in the form of Colonel (Acting) Neil Dewar Rice (he was promoted to Acting Brigadier in August 1941). On 10 December 1941, GHQ West Africa Command was formed to supersede HQ Military Forces West Africa. It had under its command four areas: Nigeria Area, Gold Coast Area, Sierra Leone Area, and Gambia Area. Shortly following this, on 29 December, Rice was replaced by Major General (Temporary) Charles George Phillips. Phillips assumed the role of General Officer Commanding The Gambia. The 81st (West Africa) Infantry Division was raised on 1 March 1943, and the 1st Battalion, Gambia Regiment, formed part of the 6th (West Africa) Infantry Brigade.

The Naval Volunteer Ordinance of 1935 in The Gambia provided for a voluntary unit called the Gambia Naval Volunteer Force. Authorisation for this force came under the Colonial Naval Defence Act 1931. The force was to abide by the regulations of the Royal Navy, and those who joined on the express wish of accepting general service in the Royal Navy during an emergency would form part of the Royal Naval Volunteer Reserve. The unit was raised on 1 March 1938, with the first officers being appointed. These were: Lieutenant Commander Alexander Skinner and Lieutenants James Reid, Kenneth Charles Jacobs, Leonard Harry Saunders, Philip McDevitt, and Clarence Cornibert du Boulay. By 1945, the officers were: Commander Archibald Ewart Adams, Lieutenant Commander James Reid, and Lieutenants Kenneth Charles Jacobs, Leonard Harry Saunders, and Thomas Neill. Two members of the GNVF are buried at Fajara War Cemetery: Able Seaman Bisenty Mendy and Cook S. Mansary.

HMS Melampus was a shore base in Bathurst, The Gambia, during World War II. Among the officers that served there were Sub-Lieutenant Charles Albert Bell, Acting Lieutenant Jack Brunwin, and Lieutenant Ernest Ronald Lester.

== Gambian coup d'état ==
- Gambia Field Force
- 1981 coup d'état attempt
- Confederal Army
- Gambia Armed Forces
- 1994 coup d'etat
- Armed Forces Provisional Ruling Council
- 2006 coup d'etat attempt
- 2014 coup d'etat attempt
- 2017 ECOWAS military intervention
- 2017 coup d'etat attempt
- 2022 coup d'etat attempt
- 2025 coup d'etat attempt
