= Aljamdu =

- Location in the Gambia
- Coordinates: 13°24′0″N 16°27′20″W
- Country: Gambia
- Division: North Bank Division
- District: Upper Niumi

Population (2008)
  - Total: 1,100

Aljamdu is a town in western Gambia. It is located in Upper Niumi District in the North Bank Division. As of 2008, it has an estimated population of 1,100.

== Philanthropy ==
Over 2000 volunteers from Aljamdu village converged at Sheikh Professor Alhaji Dr Yahya Jammeh's 3.5 hectares rice farm, located at the eastern part of the village to work and harvest more rice.
