= Jalabiro Forest Park =

- IUCN category IV (habitat/species management area)
- Interactive map of Jalabiro Forest Park
- Location: North Bank Division Gambia
- Nearest city: Salikenne
- Coordinates: 13°30′15″N 15°55′42″W
- Area: 59 ha (150 acres)
- Established: January 1, 1954

Jalabiro Forest Park is a forest park in the Gambia. Established on January 1, 1954, it covers 59 hectares.

It Is located in North Bank, the estimate terrain elevation above sea level is 12 metres.
