= Bambali =

Bambali may refer to:

- Bambali, Gambia, a town in Gambia
- Bambali, Senegal, a town in Senegal
