= Kunkilling Forest Park =

Forest park in the Gambia

- IUCN category IV (habitat/species management area)
- Interactive map of Kunkilling Forest Park
- Location: Central River Division Gambia
- Nearest city: Janjanbureh
- Coordinates: 13°31′25″N 14°42′36″W
- Area: 142 ha (350 acres)
- Established: January 1, 1954

Kunkilling Forest Park is a forest park in the Gambia. Established on January 1, 1954, it covers 142 hectares.

The forest park is located in a village called Kerr Serrekunda on the southern bank of the River Gambia. The estimate terrain elevation above sea level is 6 metres.
