= Bambali, Gambia =

Bambali
- Location in the Gambia
- Coordinates: 13°29′N 15°20′W
- Country: Gambia
- Division: North Bank Division
- District: Upper Baddibu

Population (2012)
  - Total: 1,264

Bambali is a town in eastern Gambia. It is located in Upper Baddibu District in the North Bank Division. As of 2012, it has an estimated population of 1,264.
