= Albreda =

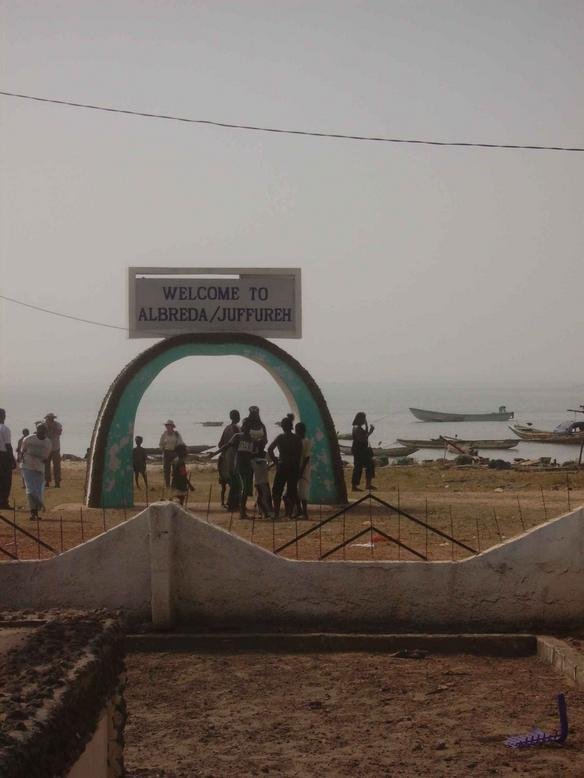
- The Albreda-Jufureh archway

- Location in the Gambia
- Coordinates: 13°20′04″N 16°23′12″W
- Country: The Gambia
- Division: North Bank Division
- District: Upper Niumi

Population (2012)
  - Total: 1,829

Albreda is a historic settlement in The Gambia on the north bank of the Gambia River, variously described as a 'trading post' or a 'slave fort'. It is located near Jufureh in the North Bank Division and an arch stands on the beach connecting the two places. As of 2008, it has an estimated population of 1,776.

== History ==
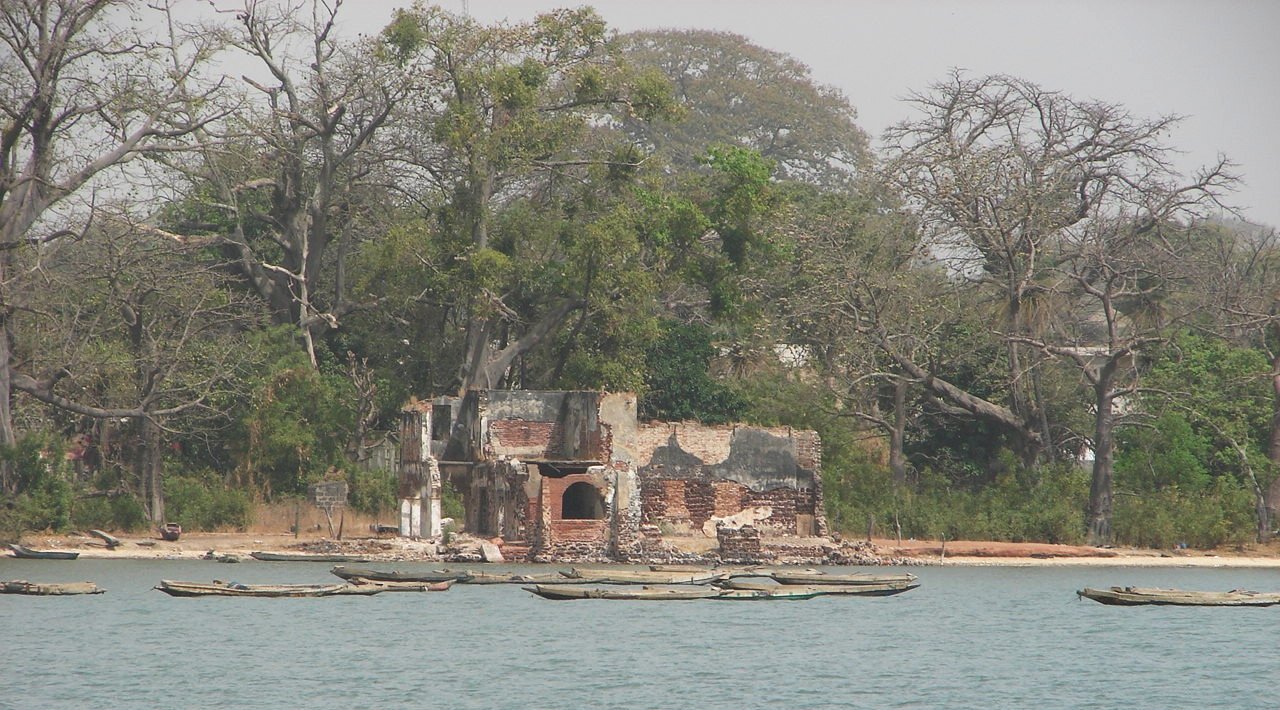
Albreda today

According to Wolof oral tradition, Musa Gaye, a Wolof marabout founded it sometime between 1520 and 1681. Wolof traders called the island Draga, while the Mandinkas called it Albadar.

In 1681, the local mansa or king of Niumi (the Upper Niumi District takes its name from this kingdom), gave the land to the French because his people depended on trade with Europeans. The French exclave was never very large (never more than one factory) but its location was inconvenient for the British, who otherwise had a monopoly on trade on the Gambia River. The British also possessed Fort James on James Island, which was less than two miles away on the opposite bank, and which fulfilled a similar function. There was constant tension and occasional skirmishes between the two powers, with Fort James changing hands between them several times.

Following a French attack, the English abandoned Fort James in 1779. The French abandoned Albreda in 1804. In 1816, however, the British returned, establishing Bathurst on St Mary's island at the mouth of the river. Shortly afterwards, the French returned to Albreda.

Albreda was transferred from French control to the British Empire in 1857. Today it contains a slave museum which opened in 1996.

== Roots ==
There is a family in the town who claim to be descendants of Kunta Kinte and oral historian Kebba Kanji Fofana, the man who was supposed to have told the Roots story to author Alex Haley, although the home of Kunta Kinte was the neighbouring village of Juffure.

== See also ==
- List of French possessions and colonies
- Portuguese Chapel of Albreda
