= Sabach Sanjal =

- District
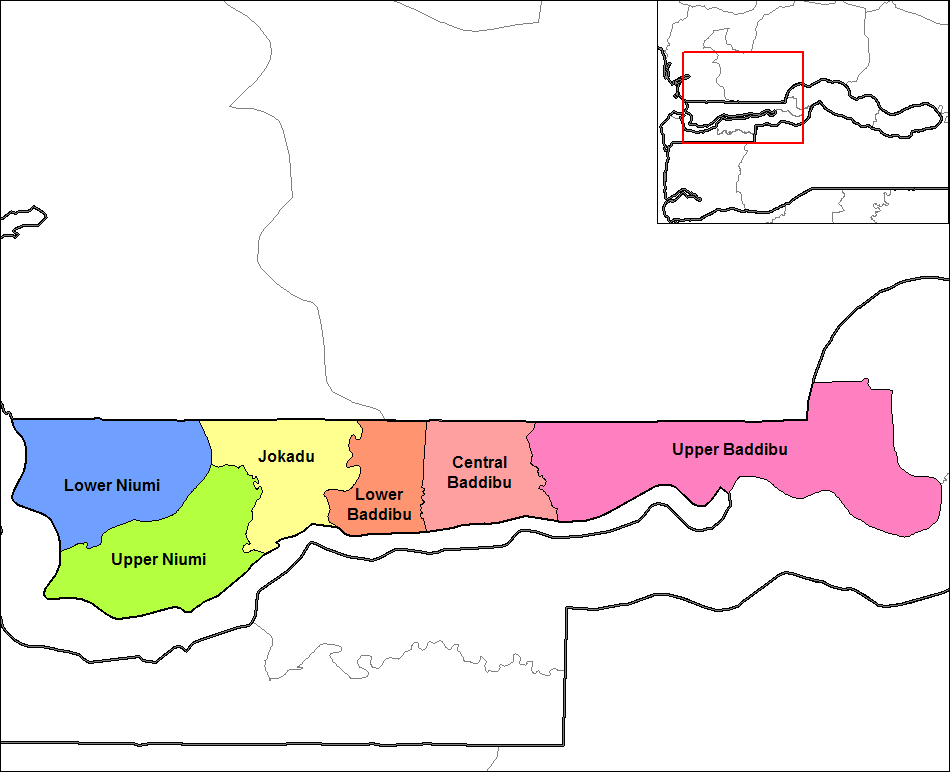
- The North Bank Division before the reorganization of 1996. Sabach Sanjal consists of the eastern part of the former Upper Baddibu.
- Country: The Gambia
- Division: North Bank Division

Sabach Sanjal is one of the districts of the North Bank Division of The Gambia, named after two former provinces of the Kingdom of Saloum.

== History ==
The capital of Sabach (or Sabakh) was Koumbidia and that of Sanjal (or Sandial) was Kataba. Both were ruled by the Camara family.

In 1862 during the Soninke-Marabout wars Sambou Oumanneh Touray, a disciple of Maba Diakhou Bâ, defeated and killed the traditional rulers Fara Sabakh and Fara Sandial, joined the two countries together and ruled it as an Islamic state.

In the local government reforms of 1996, Sabach Sanjal was created out of the former district of Upper Baddibu, along with Illiasa
