= Janjanbureh =

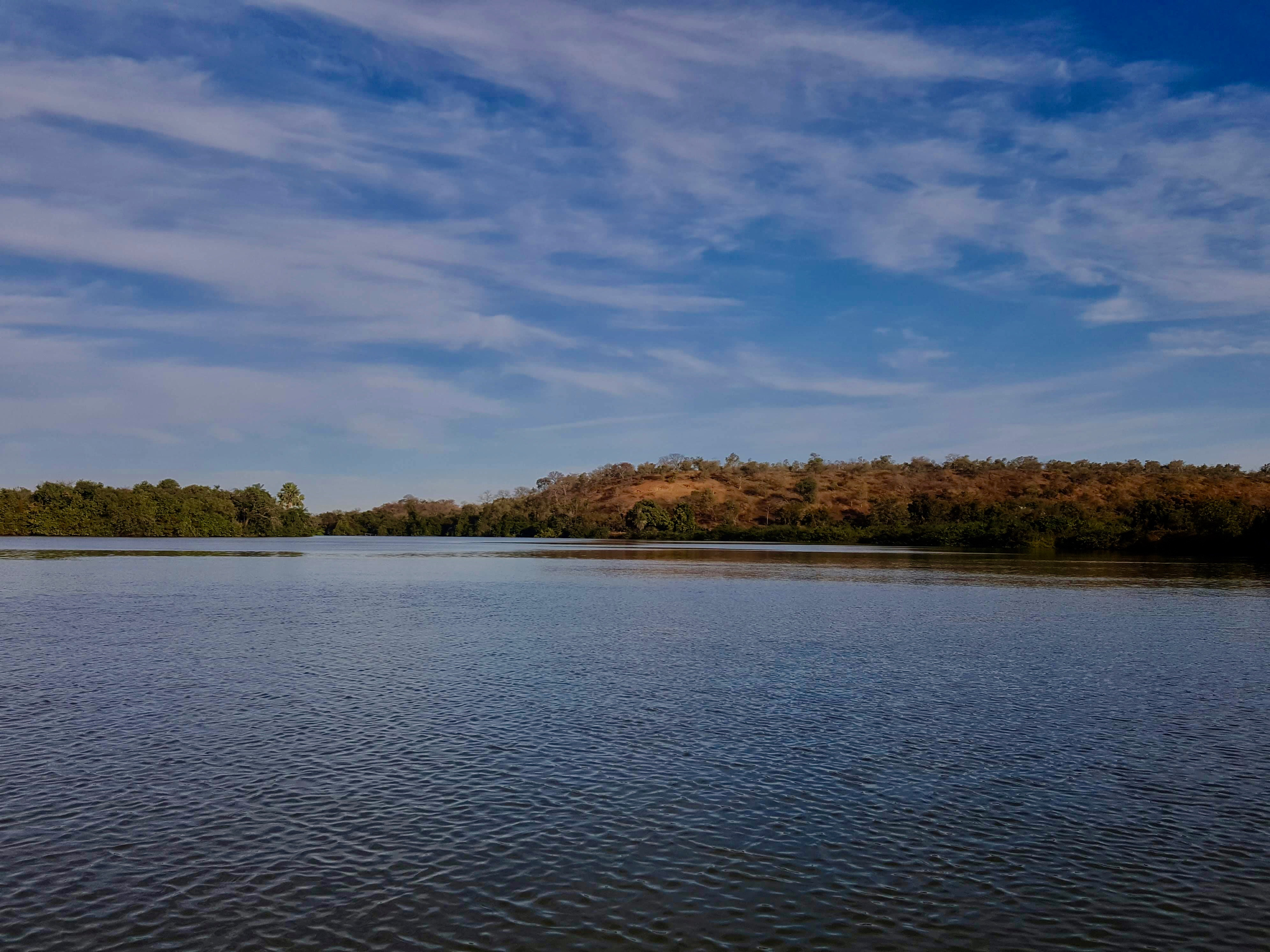

- Location in the Gambia
- Coordinates: 13°32′2.87″N 14°45′58.15″W
- Country: The Gambia
- Division: Central River Division

Janjanbureh or Jangjangbureh is a town, founded in 1823, on Janjanbureh Island, also known as MacCarthy Island, in the Gambia River in eastern Gambia. Until 1995, it was known as Georgetown and was the second largest town in the country. It is the capital of Janjanbureh Local Government Area (formerly the Central River Division), and the Janjanbureh district. The population of the Janjanbureh LGA was 127,333 at the 2013 population census.

== History ==
MacCarthy Island, then known as Lemain Island, was purchased by the British captain Alexander Grant in 1823 in exchange for annual payments to Kolli Camara, the king of Lower Niani. It was intended as a settlement for freed slaves. A dispute ensued when the colonists demanded labor from Niani, but the ruling Kamara clan sent an army instead, forcing the British to take refuge in their new fort. A counterattack on the Niani capital of Ndougousine failed, with the Mandinka capturing two cannons, but the island remained in British hands.

By the 1840s the trading post was doing steady business in hides, wax, and ivory; it was the furthest upriver post the colonial administration controlled. In 1880 the town had a population of 1263, of whom only one was a European.

Janjanbureh is the birthplace of the Yale University historian Lamin Sanneh.

== Janjanbureh today ==
The town is best known as home to Gambia's main prison. The Wassu stone circles, a major tourist attraction, lie 22 km northwest of Lamin Koto, on the north bank across from Janjanbureh.

The island is known locally as MacCarthy Island and is located in what used to be called MacCarthy Island Division. The island is accessed by bridge from the south bank, and small boat ferries or the government ferry from the north bank. In 1995, both the city of Georgetown and MacCarthy Island were renamed Janjanbureh respectively.

== Climate ==
Climate data for Janjanbureh (1991–2020)
Month	Jan	Feb	Mar	Apr	May	Jun	Jul	Aug	Sep	Oct	Nov	Dec	Year
Mean daily maximum °C (°F)	34.9 (94.8)	37.3 (99.1)	39.4 (102.9)	40.6 (105.1)	40.1 (104.2)	37.2 (99.0)	33.3 (91.9)	32.0 (89.6)	32.3 (90.1)	34.3 (93.7)	36.1 (97.0)	35.3 (95.5)	36.1 (97.0)
Daily mean °C (°F)	24.7 (76.5)	27.0 (80.6)	29.2 (84.6)	31.0 (87.8)	31.8 (89.2)	30.8 (87.4)	28.5 (83.3)	27.7 (81.9)	27.6 (81.7)	28.6 (83.5)	27.2 (81.0)	25.2 (77.4)	28.3 (82.9)
Mean daily minimum °C (°F)	14.7 (58.5)	16.9 (62.4)	19.1 (66.4)	21.4 (70.5)	23.5 (74.3)	24.5 (76.1)	23.7 (74.7)	23.5 (74.3)	23.1 (73.6)	22.9 (73.2)	18.3 (64.9)	15.3 (59.5)	20.6 (69.1)
Average precipitation mm (inches)	0.3 (0.01)	0.0 (0.0)	0.0 (0.0)	0.0 (0.0)	10.2 (0.40)	79.4 (3.13)	192.0 (7.56)	272.5 (10.73)	206.9 (8.15)	56.2 (2.21)	0.7 (0.03)	0.0 (0.0)	818.2 (32.21)
Average precipitation days (≥ 1.0 mm)	0.1	0.0	0.0	0.0	0.7	4.9	10.9	15.3	13.1	4.2	0.1	0.0	49.3
Source: NOAA

== Gallery ==
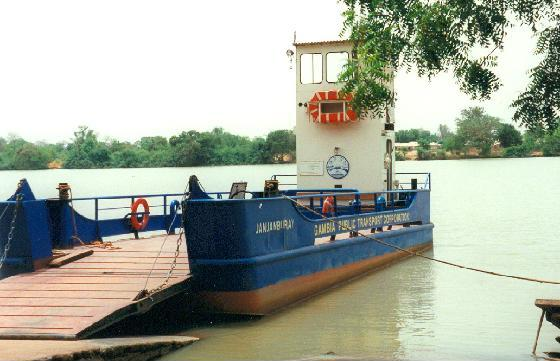
Jajanbureh ferry

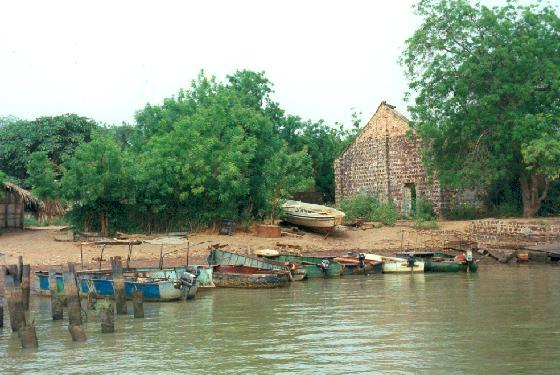
The slave house, a museum of the slave trade

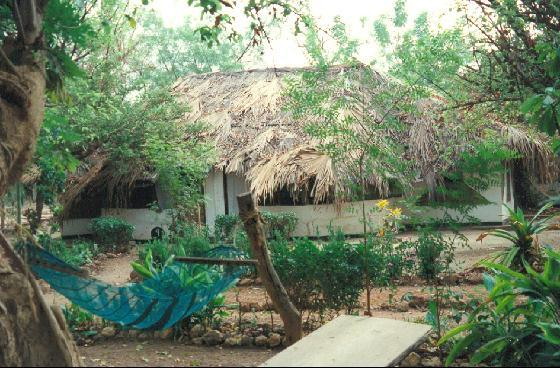
Hut at the Jangjangbureh Camp

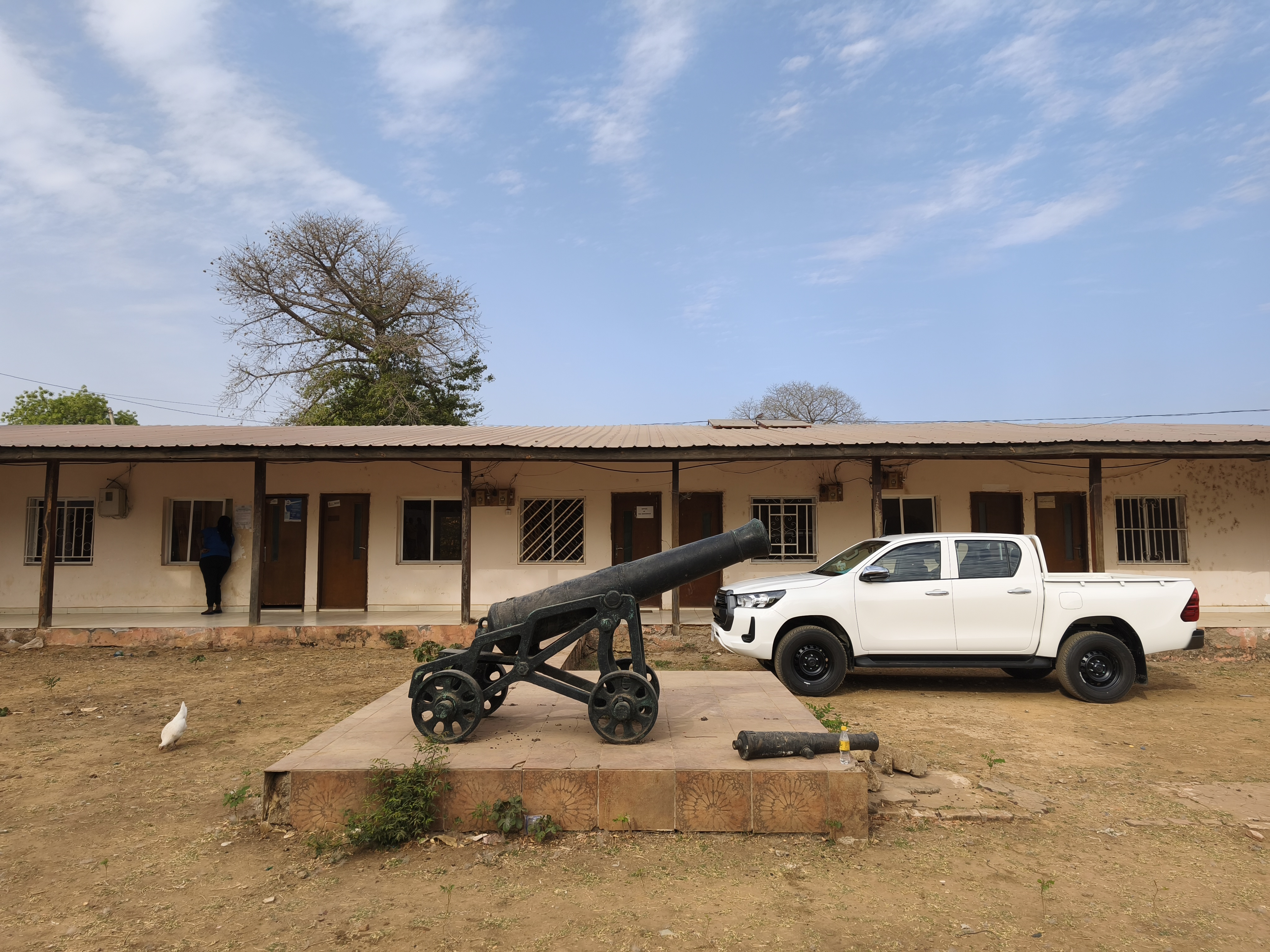
Bigger British and smaller French cannon in Janjanbureh
Photos from Janjanbureh
