= Badibu =

Former West African state

Kingdom of Badibu
- Religion: Traditional African religion, Islam
- Government: Monarchy
- King (Mansa)
Preceded by	Succeeded by
Mali Empire; Jolof Empire	French Senegal; Gambia Colony and Protectorate
- Today part of: Senegal, The Gambia

Badibu, also known as Rip, was a small state in what is today southern Senegal and The Gambia. It is the namesake for three districts of the North Bank Division of the Gambia, Lower Baddibu, Central Baddibu and Upper Baddibu.

== History ==
In 1861, Maba Diakhou Bâ took control of Badibbu, which was then in Saloum's political orbit.
