= Portuguese Chapel of Albreda =

Coordinates: 13.3335°N 16.3853°W

- Portuguese Chapel of Albreda
- Location: Albreda
- Country: Gambia
- Denomination: Roman Catholic Church

The Portuguese Chapel of Albreda or just Albreda Chapel, also Portuguese Chapel of San Domingo, is the name given to a Catholic chapel built by Portuguese explorers in the fifteenth century in the area of Albreda which is now a part of the African country of Gambia. It is currently in ruins and was stabilized for protection in 2000.

It is one of the oldest buildings in West Africa, was declared a World Heritage Site by Unesco, along with six other places like James Island (James Island and Related Sites) from 2003. Before 1995 the remains were under the protection under the national monument status. The space under the protection of the Portuguese chapel in Albreda as world heritage has an area of 0,006 hectares.

The remains of the chapel (sometimes called a church) are about 100 meters west of the settlement of Albreda, a former French possession. Slightly more than 50 percent of the walls are still present. The back wall is still in its entirety. In its top a metal cross can be seen.

== See also ==
- Roman Catholicism in the Gambia
- Portuguese Empire
