= Kingdom of Niani =

Former country in present-day Gambia and Senegal

- 14th century–1888
- Status: Kingdom
- Capital: Koumpentoum
- Common languages: Mandinka
- Religion: African traditional religions, Islam
- Government: Monarchy
- Mansa
  - 14th century: Cansia Kamara
  - 1820s: Kimintan Kamara
- History
  - Founding by Cansia Kamara: 14th century
  - French protectorate established: 1888
- Currency: cloth, salt, gold
Preceded by	Succeeded by
Mali Empire	Gambia Colony and Protectorate; French Senegal

Niani was a Mandinka kingdom located on the north bank of the Gambia River from approximately the 14th to the late 19th century in what is now The Gambia and Senegal.

== History ==
=== Founding ===
Oral histories relate that, during the 14th century, many members of the Kamara clan left the town of Niani in the Mali Empire after a failed rebellion against the Mansa. They initially settled in Kaabu, then crossed the Gambia river. At the time the area was a part of the Kingdom of Wuli, but some sources claim that the Kamara were given the land by the Buurba of the Jolof Empire. Two brothers, Cansia and Mansaly Kamara, established separate branches of the family in Niani, with Cansia founding Koumpentoum as the capital of his new kingdom, named after the homeland they had left behind. The Kamara would rule the state until its incorporation into the French colony of Senegal in the late 19th century. The capital was later moved to Diambour, and eventually to Ndougousine in the 19th century.

Modern-day historians have proposed that the Mandinka elite of Niani and Wuli did not, in fact, immigrate from the Manding region but may have come much earlier, from Bambouk and the upper Senegal River valley. The migration story may be a dramatization of what was actually a gradual process of ethnic transformation under the cultural and political hegemony of the Mali Empire.

=== Apogee ===
Always an important center, the arrival of Europeans in the 15th century greatly Niani's trade, particularly channeling gold from Bambuk and Bure down the Gambia. Nianimaru, a village marking the furthest navigable point on the river for large seafaring ships, was particularly prosperous. Torodbe refugees from Futa Toro in the late 18th and early 19th centuries progressively islamized the kingdom, although the aristocracy retained their traditional beliefs.

=== Colonialism ===
During the 19th century upper and lower Niani were ruled by separate Kamara branches. Sometime in the early decades, Kimintan Kamara killed his older brothers to seize the throne of Upper Niani and established a new capital at Ndougousine.

In 1823, Kolli Kamara, king of Kataba (lower Niani) ceded MacCarthy Island to the British, who built Georgetown there. A dispute ensued when the colonists demanded labor from Niani, but the Kamara sent an army instead, forcing the British to take refuge in their new fort. A counterattack on Ndougousine failed, with the Mandinka capturing two cannons.

The region-wide Marabout Wars of the 19th century, particularly the campaigns of Mahmadu Lamine, devastated regional trade and Niani's economy. In 1888 the kingdom signed a protectorate treaty with France, ending its independence.

== Sources ==
- Galloway, Winifred (1975). A History of Wuli from the Thirteenth to the Nineteenth Century (History PhD). University of Indiana.
- Traore, Mamadou (2021). "Les royaumes du Niani et du Wuli, des origines a la conquete coloniale". In Fall, Mamadou; Fall, Rokhaya; Mane, Mamadou (eds.). Bipolarisation du Senegal du XVIe - XVIIe siecle (in French). Dakar: HGS Editions. pp. 284–316.
