= Edrissa Sonko =

Gambian footballer (born 1980)

Personal information
- Date of birth: 23 March 1980 (age 46)
- Place of birth: Essau, Gambia
- Height: 6 ft 0 in (1.83 m)
- Position: Forward

Youth career
- 1995–1997: Steve Biko F.C.
- 1997–1998: Real de Banjul
- 1998–1999: Anderlecht

Senior career*
Years	Team	Apps	(Gls)
1999–2000	Anderlecht	6	(1)
2000–2007	Roda JC	112	(20)
2007	Skoda Xanthi	9	(1)
2007–2008	Walsall	37	(5)
2008–2009	Tranmere Rovers	38	(5)
2009–2010	Hereford United	10	(0)
2010	APEP	0	
2010–2011	Ras Al Khaima		
2011–2012	Masafi		
2012–2013	Al-Taawon		

International career
1996–2009	Gambia	14	(3)
- * Club domestic league appearances and goals

Edrissa Sonko (born 23 March 1980) is a Gambian former professional football who played as a forward.

== Club career ==
Sonko was born in Essau. His previous clubs are Steve Biko F.C., Real de Banjul, Anderlecht, Roda JC, Walsall, Tranmere Rovers and Skoda Xanthi.

He netted his first Tranmere goal in the win at home to Accrington Stanley in the Football League Trophy in September 2008. His first league goal followed just over a week later away at Huddersfield Town, he scored a long range volley in the 2–1 Tranmere win.

Scottish side Falkirk F.C. were reportedly interested in signing him but on 19 September 2009, Sonko signed a one-year deal with Hereford United. He was released at the end of the season and moved to Cypriot side APEP. In September 2010 he joined Ras AlKhaima Club in the United Arab Emirates. He scored his first goal for Ras AlKhaima Club against Ajman.

== International career ==
Sonko played 14 international matches and scored seven goals for Gambia.
