= Essau =

- Town
- Location in the Gambia
- Coordinates: 13°28′42″N 16°31′01″W
- Country: The Gambia
- Division: North Bank Division
- District: Lower Niumi
- Elevation: 37 ft (11 m)

Population (2009)
  - Total: 14,560 (est.)
- Time zone: UTC+00:00 (GMT)

Essau is a small town in north-western Gambia. It is located in Lower Niumi District in the North Bank Division. As of 2009, it has an estimated population of 6,670.

== Notable people ==
- Edrissa Sonko
- Mustapha Marong, former Attorney General
- Alhaji Mafoday Sonko, former Member of Parliament
- Nfamara Bintou Sonko, former Colonial Chief
- Lang Sally Sonko former Colonial Chief
- Burungai Sonko, king of Barra/Niumi, fought the 1831 war against King George IV).
- Mansa Maranta Sonko, last king of Niumi
