= Central Baddibu =

District of the Gambia

Coordinates: 13°32′N 15°55′W

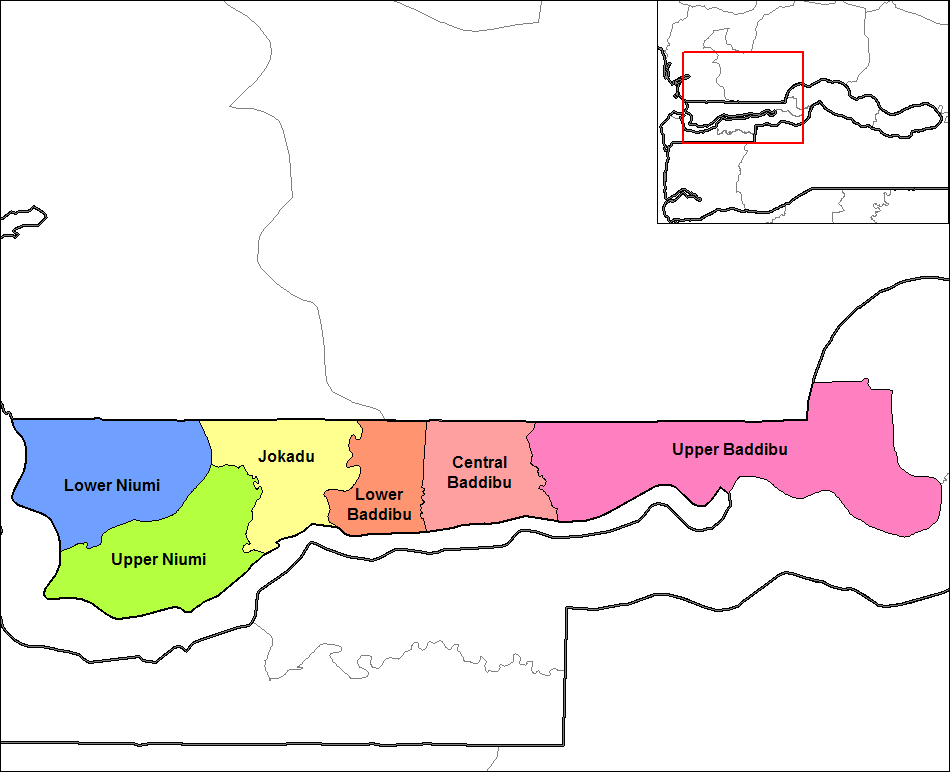
Districts of North Bank Division

Central Baddibu is one of the six districts of the North Bank Division of the Gambia. In the 2013 census, it had a population of 20,104. It is named after the pre-colonial state of Badibu.
