= Barra, Gambia =

Barra
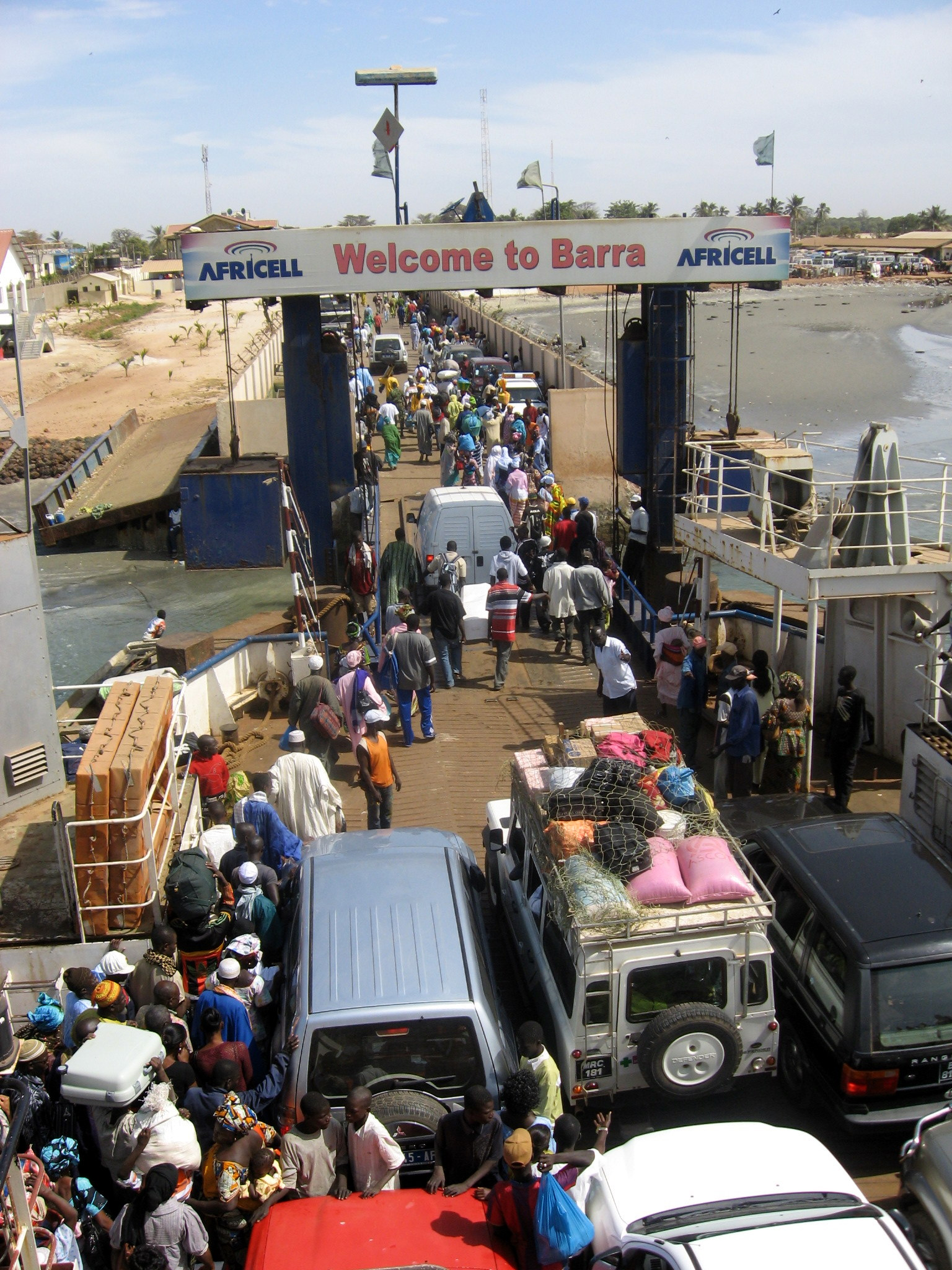
- Arriving at Barra by ferry

- Location in the Gambia
- Coordinates: 13°29′N 16°33′W
- Country: The Gambia
- Division: North Bank Division
- District: Lower Niumi

Government
  - Al Kali: Alhagi Faye

Barra, traditionally known as Niumi, is a city in The Gambia, located in the district of Lower Niumi. The predominant languages of the city are Serer and Wolof.

Although Mandinka-speaking Africans always referred to the state along the north bank of the Gambia River's estuary as Niumi, not everyone did. For a long time it was called "Barra" in the creolized trade language of the river, and between the seventeenth and nineteenth centuries British and French records use "Barra" or "Bar" more frequently than "Niumi".

== See also ==
- Niumi National Park
