= MacCarthy Island =

Island on the Gambia River

Native name: Janjanbureh Island
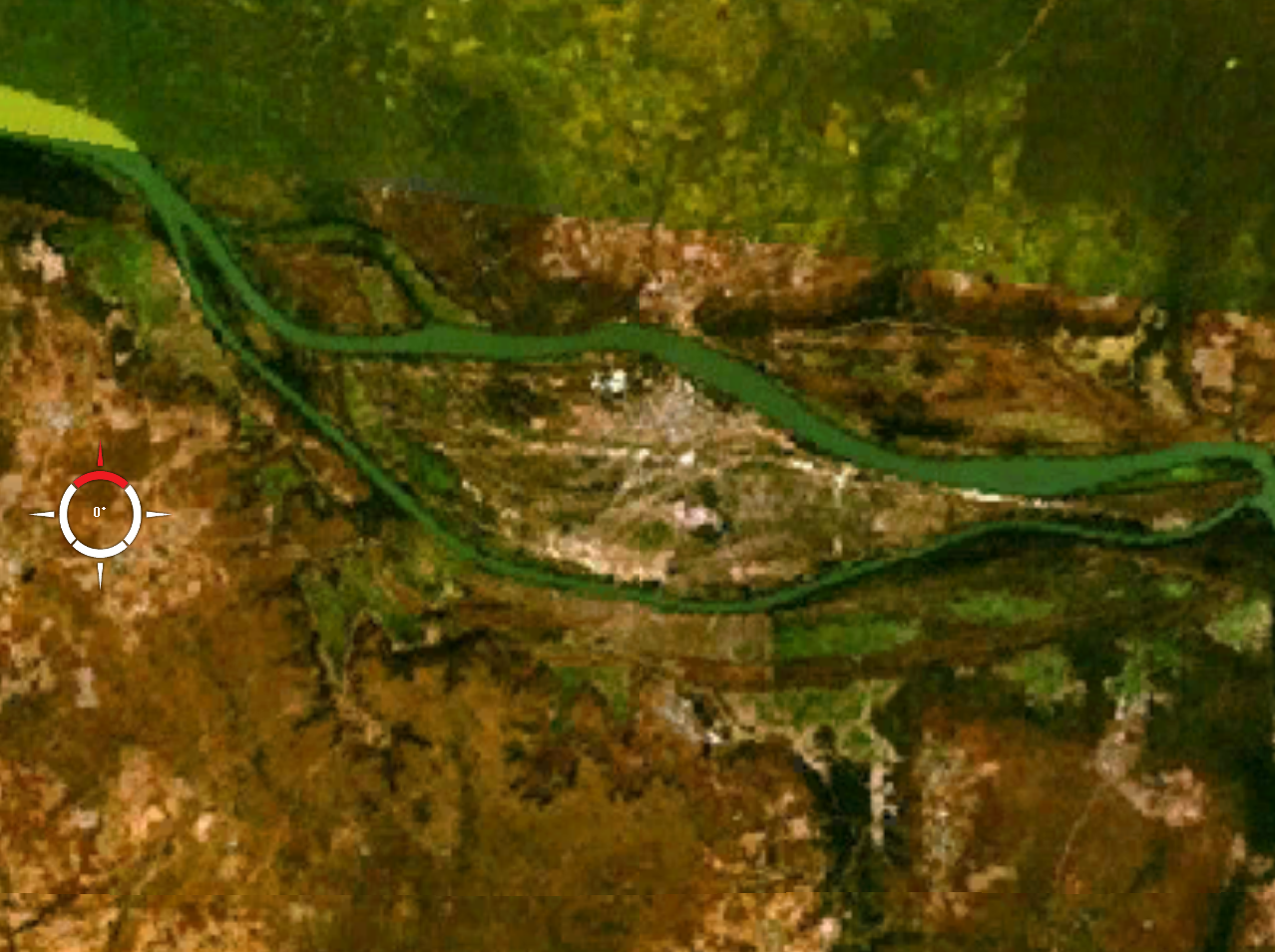
- Satellite image of MacCarthy Island

- Location within The Gambia

Geography
- Location: Gambia River
- Coordinates: 13.535°N 14.765°W
- Length: 10 km (6 mi)
- Width: 2.5 km (1.55 mi)

Administration
- The Gambia
- Largest settlement: Janjanbureh (pop. 3,446)

Demographics
- Population: 3,998
- Ethnic groups: Mandinka, Wolof, Fulani

MacCarthy Island, officially named Janjanbureh Island and historically known as Lemain Island, is an island located approximately 170 miles (272 km) upriver from the mouth of the Gambia River, in eastern Gambia, in the Janjanbureh District. Located on the island is the second-largest town in the country, Janjanbureh, but on many maps it still appears by its European name of Georgetown. In addition to being a destination for some wildlife tourists, the island is also the home of Gambia's largest prison.

== History ==
The island was first settled by Western traders in the 15th century, although by the 19th century it was no longer a viable trading post due to frequent wars between the states of Wuli and Niani. The island was subsequently purchased by the British to use initially as a prison colony after the loss of most North American colonies and later as a military garrison to help protect the traders. A treaty of cession was signed in 1823 in exchange for annual payments to the chief, and the island was formally named MacCarthy Island (after Sir Charles MacCarthy, former Governor General of the British West African Territories). In 1832, Georgetown was founded by the British as a Creole settlement, although it was quickly populated by liberated Africans from elsewhere. The town gradually became an administrative and economic centre for the country.
