= Lower Baddibu =

Coordinates: 13°30′N 16°03′W

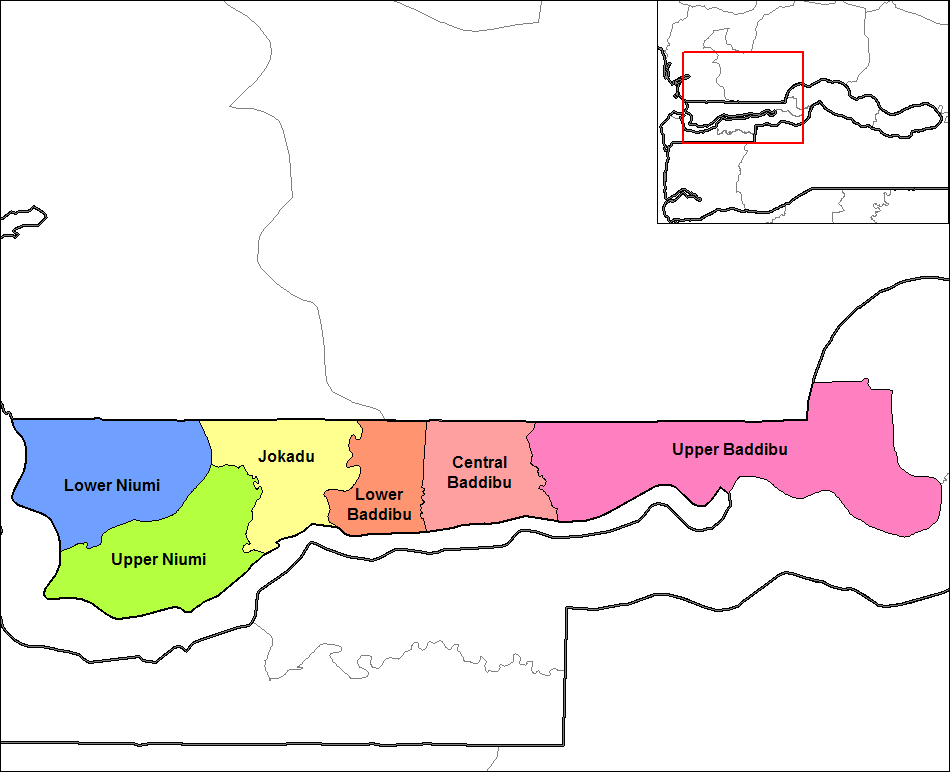
Districts of North Bank Division

Lower Baddibu is one of the six districts of the North Bank Division of the Gambia. In the 2013 census, it had a population of 18,030. It is named after the pre-colonial state of Badibu.
