= Upper Baddibu =

- District
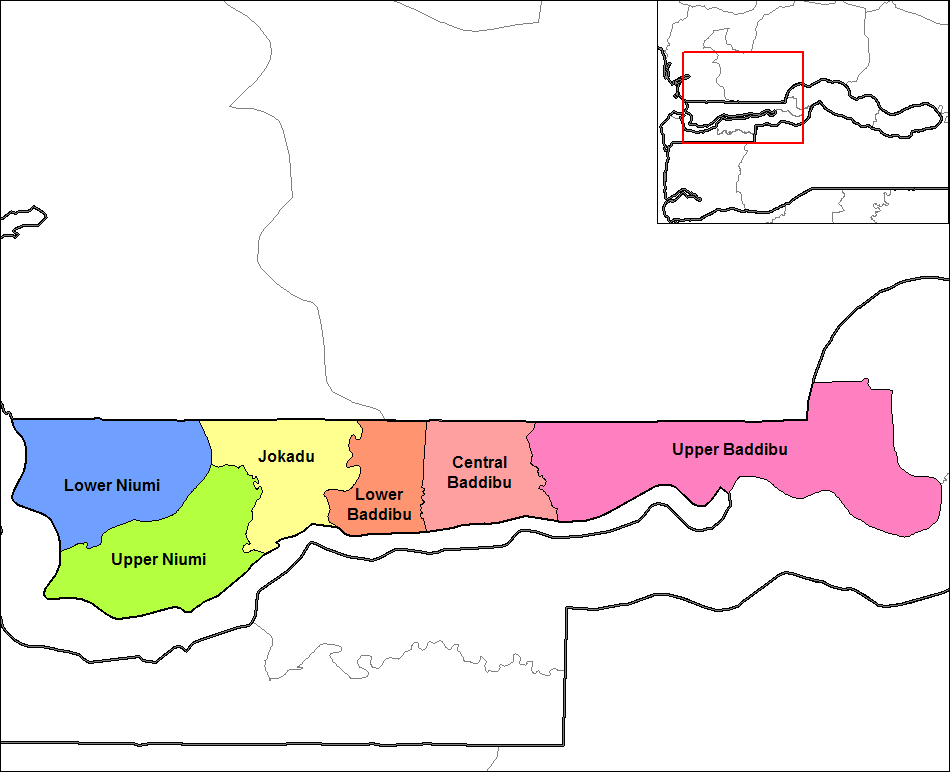
- Location within North Bank Division
- Coordinates: 13°34′N 15°36′W
- Country: The Gambia
- Division: North Bank Division

Upper Baddibu was one of the six districts of the North Bank Division of The Gambia. Its main town was Farafenni. The North Bank Division is now the Kerewan Local Government Area, and the former Upper Baddibu District is now divided into an Illiasa District and a Sabach Sanjal District. Its population in the 2003 census, prior to division, was 55,370. It is named after the pre-colonial state of Badibu.
