= Jokadu =

Coordinates: 13°32′N 16°11′W

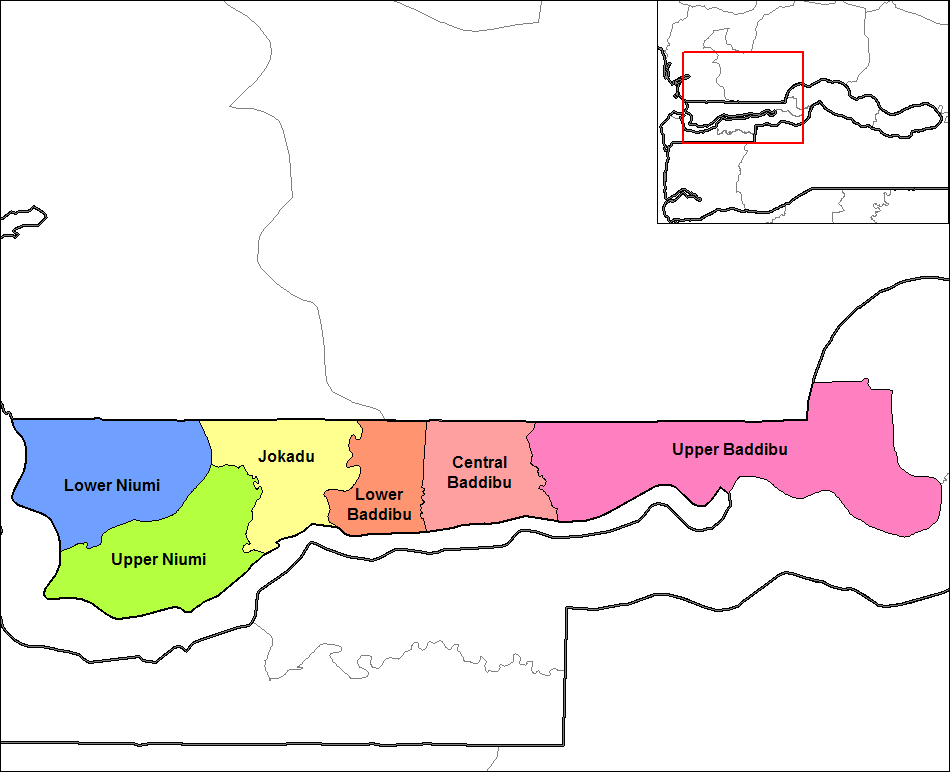
Districts of North Bank Division

Jokadu is one of the six districts of the North Bank Division of the Gambia. In the 2013 census, it had a population of 22,132.

Families living in the Jokadu district of the Gambia are amongst the poorest in Africa. A project is underway to build a health clinic in the village of Bakang. The nearest medical help is a 4-hour journey from Bakang by donkey cart. This means there are many fatalities, due to the time lapse before appropriate treatment can be administered. The Jokado District Development Fund is helping to fund the building of a health clinic in the village which will be staffed by young people, who have left the village to gain qualifications. They will return to work and live in their home village.
