= Lower Niumi =

Coordinates: 13°32′N 16°25′W

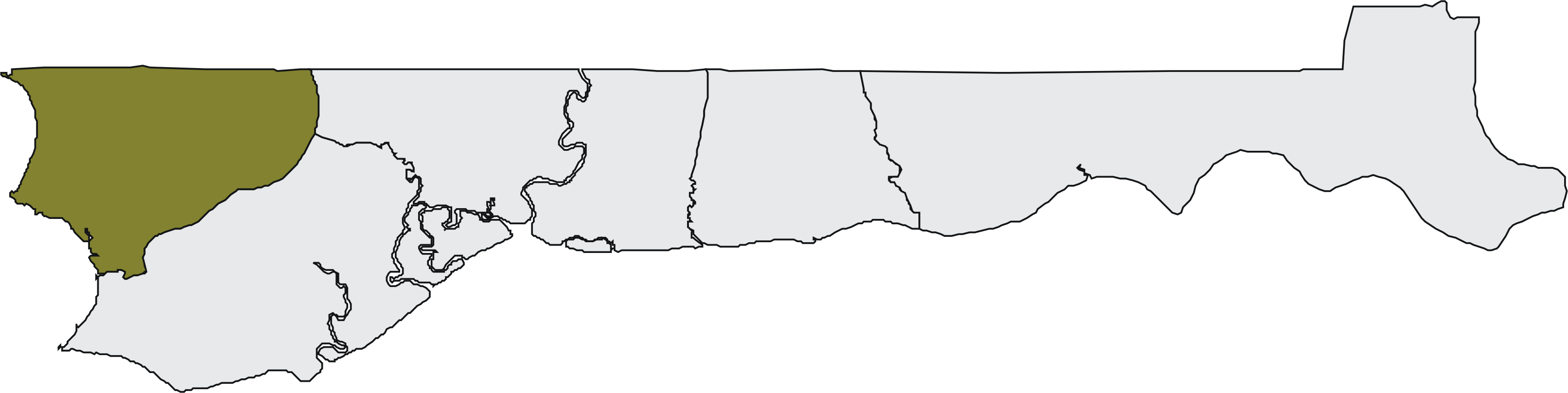
Lower Niumi within the North Bank Division

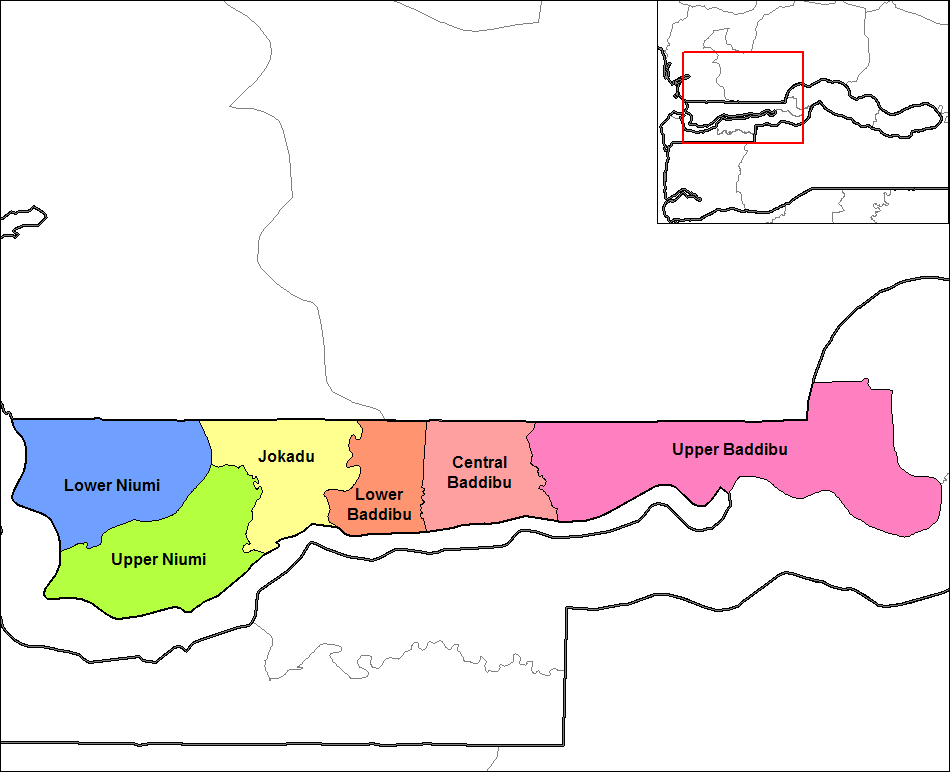
Districts of North Bank Division

Lower Niumi is one of the six districts of the North Bank Division of the Gambia. In the 2013 census, it had a population of 57,358.
