= North Bank Division =

Administrative division of the Gambia

Coordinates: 13°29′10″N 15°55′48″W

North Bank
- Division
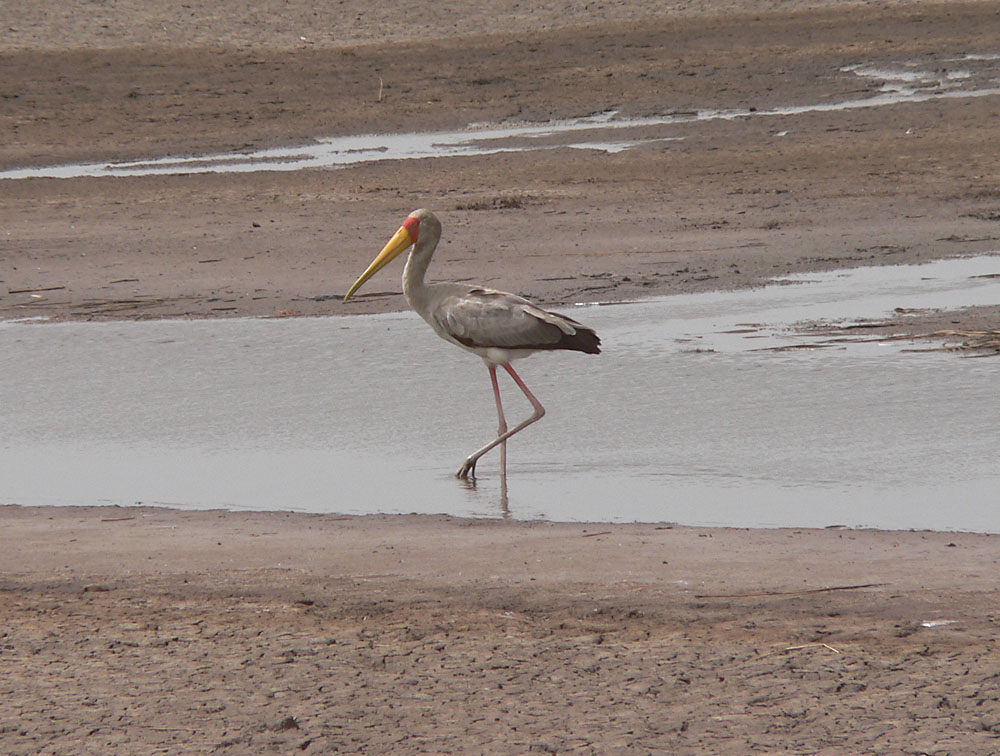

- Location of North Bank Division in the Gambia
- Country: Gambia
- Capital: Kerewan

Area
  - Total: 2,256 km^{2} (871 sq mi)

Population (2013 census)
  - Total: 221,054
  - Density: 97.98/km^{2} (253.8/sq mi)
- Area code: (+220)

North Bank was one of the five administrative divisions of the Gambia. Its capital was Kerewan. It was subsequently reorganised as the Kerewan Local Government Area (LGA), without any change in the area covered.

Per 2013 census, the region had a population of 221,054 with a population density of 98 inh./km^{2}. The total number of households was 18,458 as of 2003. As of 2003, the total area of the region is 2255.5 km^{2}. The infant mortality rate was 81 for every thousand births and the under-five mortality was 109 per every thousand births. The poverty gap ratio was 33.2 per cent as of 2003.

== Geography ==
The Gambia is the smallest country in Africa, with the width of the country never exceeding 48 km (30 mi). It is bordered by the Atlantic Ocean on the west, while being surrounded by Senegal in all other directions. The Gambia River flows throughout the country and is the principal source of water and transport medium. The banks of the river have swampy beaches, while it has alluvial soil in all other parts, which is conducive for the growth of rice. Peanuts are the major cashcrop. The weather is usually warm and dry. The elevation of the country reaches to a maximum of 50 m (160 ft) above mean sea level. There are vast segments of sedimentary sandstone and claystone in the valleys of the rivers and the regions surrounding it. The river flows from Guinea and has an east–west axis. The shallow water in the coastline are important sources of fishing. There are mangrove and banto forests along the coastline. Over the river segment of 487 km (303 mi), there are numerous creeks, which are locally called boloons. The months from June to September experience a wet season, while the remaining seven months are dry. The average annual rainfall is around 1,400 mm (55 in) in the south east, while it is 720 mm (28 in) in the northwest. Experts have assessed that the overall rainfall during the century period between 1886 and 1992, there has been a reduction in rainfall of around 15-20 per cent and the wet season has been shortened.

== Demographics ==
Per 2013 census, the region had a population of 221,054 with a population density of 098. The total number of households was 18,458 as of 2003. As of 2003, the total area of the region is 2255.5 km^{2}. The infant mortality rate was 81 for every thousand births and the under-five mortality was 109 per every thousand births. The poverty gap ratio was 33.2 per cent as of 2003. The literacy rate of the province was 59.8 compared to a national average of 62.9 per cent. The net enrollment ratio in primary education was 57 per cent, children entering first grade of primary school reaching last grade of primary education was 100 per cent and the ratios of boys against girls in primary, secondary and tertiary education was 1.09 as of 2007.

== Local administration ==
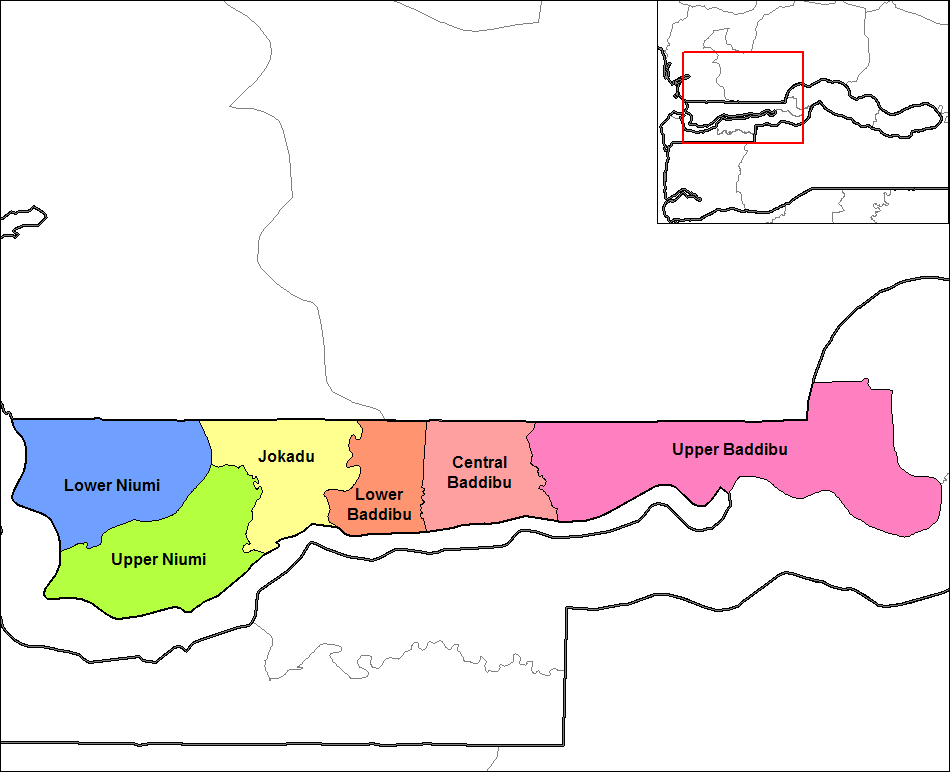
Districts of North Bank

The Gambia along with modern-day Senegal were colonies of French and British until 1894 when it became a British colony. Both the countries got independence in 1965 and operated in a federation called Senegambia from 1982. During 1989, the confederation collapsed. In a bloodless coup, Lieutenant Yahya Jamme in 1994 and went on to win multi party elections in three subsequent elections. He has also defeated coups successfully and unlike the West African countries, the Gambia has a relative stable governance. The Local Government Act passed in 2002 superseded the previous local government acts like Local Government Act (Amended 1984), Local Government (City of Banjul) Act (Amended 1988), The Kanifing Municipal Council Act 1991 and the Provinces Act. There were seven local governments defined each subdivided into districts and wards. The Mayor who is the chairperson of the council and the council members of each council is elected by people of the area. The legislations indicating the roles were not clearly defined, but the council is responsible for finance, services and planning for each sector under it. Around 25 per cent of the budget is provisioned by the central government. The council also has a Alkalo or Seyfo representative, a Chief representative, a youth nominee, a woman nominee and other nominated members of local interest groups.

North Bank is divided into six districts, namely, Central Baddibu, Jokadu, Lower Baddibu, Lower Niumi, Upper Baddibu and Upper Niumi. The city and area council elections were held during April 2002, when Kanimang Sanneh, an APRC candidate became the Mayor, winning 64.2 per cent votes. The council was led by Alliance for Patriotic Reorientation and Construction (APRC), which won all fourteen seats.
