= Porokhane =

Town in Kaolack, Senegal

Porokhane Prokhane
- Town
- Location in Senegal
- Country: Senegal
- Region: Kaolack
- Department: Kaolack
- Arrondissement: Paoskoto
- Time zone: UTC+0 (GMT)

Porokhane (also spelled Prokhane) is a town and commune near Nioro du Rip in Paoskoto Arrondissement, Kaolack Region, Senegal. It is a major pilgrimage site for the Mourides of Senegal.

== Pilgrimage ==
Porokhane is a place of annual pilgrimage known as the Grand Magal, where hundreds of thousands of pilgrims, especially women, pay homage to Mame Diarra Bousso, who is the mother of Sheikh Amadou Bamba, the founder of Mouridism. She had died in Porokhane in 1866 at the age of 33. The mausoleum and the well of Mame Diarra Bousso are on the official list of historic sites and monuments in Senegal.

Mame Diarra Bousso's family came from Golléré, a village near Fouta and Mbacké. Today, she is celebrated annually by hundreds of thousands of pilgrims at Porokhane, where she remains buried.

== Notable people ==
- Serigne Moustapha Mbacke Bassirou is the grandson of Amadou Bamba and the eldest son of Sheikh Mouhamadoul Bachir. He modernized Porokhane village, founded the Maam Diaara foundation, and set up a girls' boarding school in Porokhane that can accommodate 400 students.

== Villages ==
Porokhane rural community consists of the main capital Porokhane, and villages such as Prokhane Ouolof, Prokhane Peuhl and Prokhane Toucouleur.

== See also ==
- Amadou Bamba
- Grand Magal of Touba
