= Gandiaye Arrondissement =

Gandiaye
- Arrondissement
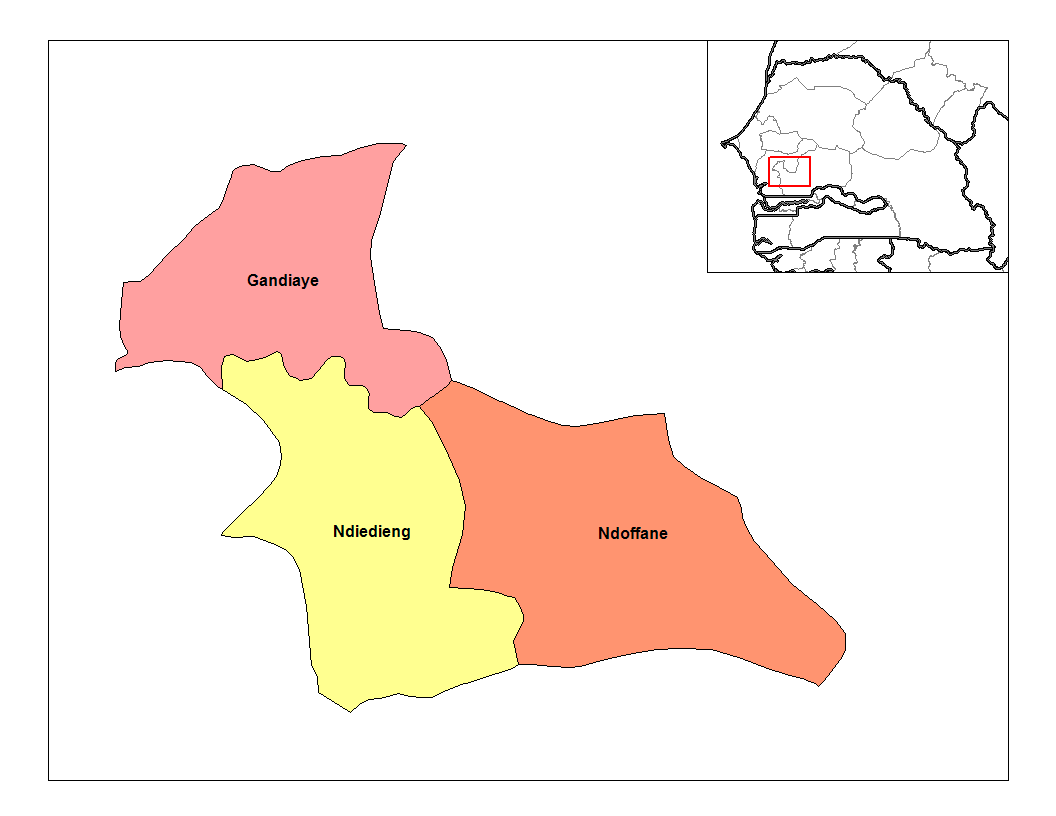
- Location in the Kaolack Department
- Country: Senegal
- Region: Kaolack Region
- Department: Kaolack Department
- Time zone: UTC±00:00 (GMT)

Gandiaye Arrondissement is an arrondissement of the Kaolack Department in the Kaolack Region of Senegal.

== Subdivisions ==
The arrondissement is divided administratively into rural communities and in turn into villages.
