= Paoskoto =

- Rural commune and village
- Location within Senegal
- Coordinates: 13°47′N 15°49′W
- Country: Senegal
- Region: Kaffrine Region
- Department: Nioro du Rip Department
- Arrondissement: Paoskoto Arrondissement

Population
  - Total: 43,460
- Time zone: UTC+0 (GMT)

Paoskoto (often Paoscoto or Paos Koto) is a village and rural commune in Paoskoto Arrondissement in the Nioro du Rip Department of the Kaolack Region of Senegal, located near the border with the Gambia.

== History ==
On 30 November 1865, Maba Diakhou Bâ battled against Émile Pinet-Laprade at the Battle of Paoskoto, in a notable historical battle between the valiant soldiers of the Nioro Du Rip Kingdom against the French colonizers. The battle was a humiliating defeat for the French as they were ambushed and suffered considerable losses compared to the other side. The French colonizers, led by Émile Pinet-Laprade, then retreated to Djoloff to regroup. This epic battle is largely celebrated even today in Senegal.

== Geography ==
The nearest localities are Keur Oumar Tounkara, Dafar, Keur Gaye Hamdalaye, Mbiteyene, Tayyiba Niassène, Keur bidja Uri Keur Ali Gueye, Nioro du Rip and Diamaguene.

== Demographics ==
According to PEPAM (Programme d'eau potable et d'assainissement du Millénaire) the rural commune of Paoskoto has a population 43,460 and 4,061 households. The population of the village of Paoskoto amounts to 2,411 inhabitants in 225 households. The Wolof and Fulani tribes form the majority.

== Bibliography ==
- (in French) A. K. Mbaye, L’épopée de Maba Diakhou Ba du Rip, mémoire de maîtrise, Dakar, Faculté des Lettres et Sciences humaines, Département de Lettres modernes, 1996
- (in French) Kélétigui S. Keita, Maba Diakhou Ba dans le Rip et le Saloum (1861-1867), Dakar, Université de Dakar, 1970, 165 p. (Mémoire de Maîtrise)
