= Ndoucoumane =

Province in Senegal

Ndoucoumane or Ndoukoumane is a historical region of Senegal and a former province of the Kingdom of Saloum. Its capital is Kaffrine.

The province was established by Maad Saloum Mbegane Ndour shortly after his coming to the throne as a fief for his ally Wali Mbérou Ndaw, of the former ruling family of Namandirou.

The area is described in Ken Bugul's book The Abandoned Baobab or in the original French, Le Baobab Fou, meaning the crazy baobab.
