= Saloum =

Serer kingdom in present-day Senegal

Kingdom of Saloum Saluum
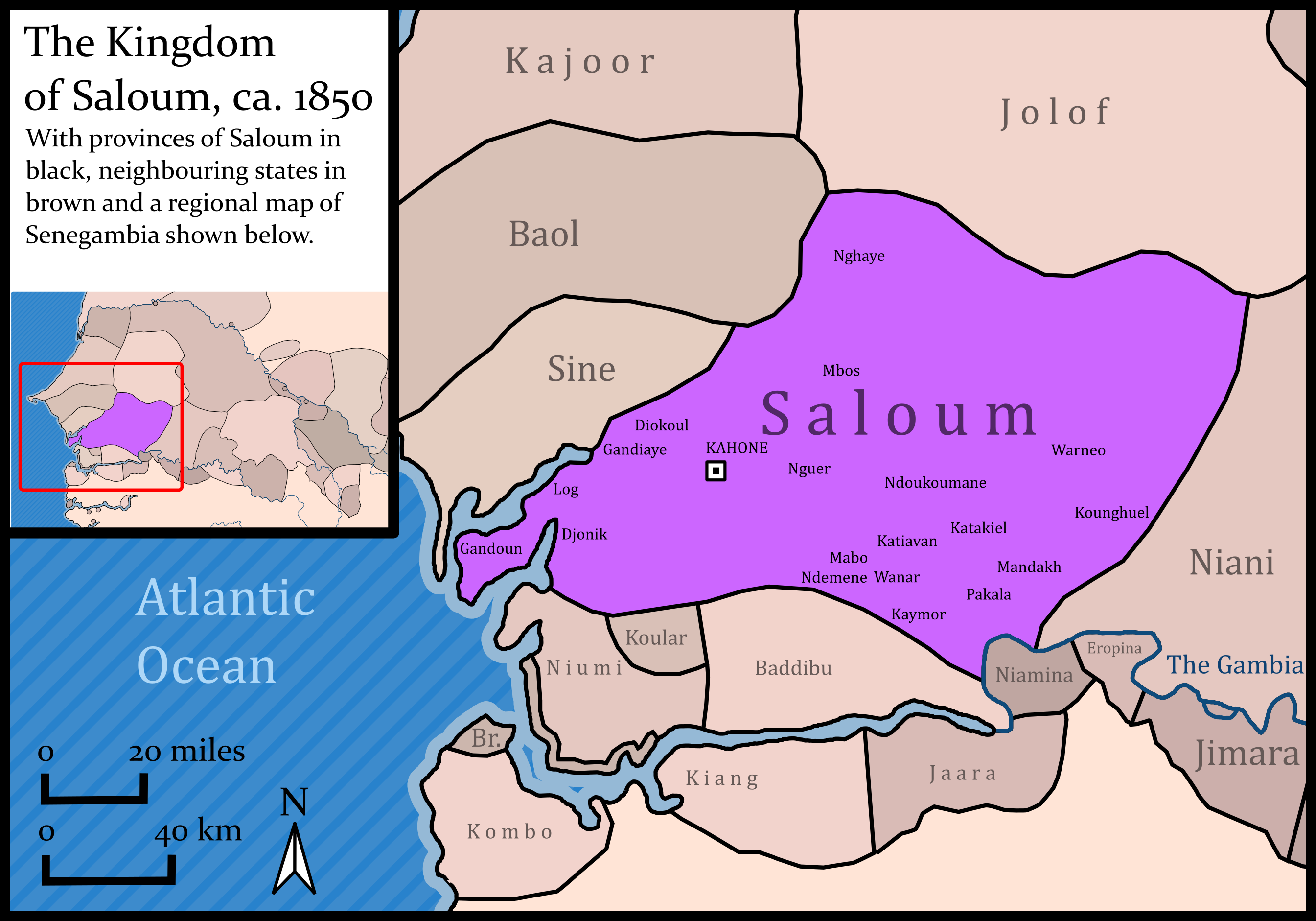
- Saloum ca. 1850
- Status: State from c. 1494-1867; Currently a non-sovereign monarchy within Senegal
- Capital: Kahone
- Common languages: Serer (early period); Cangin languages (early period); Wolof (late period)
- Religion: Serer religion; Islam (mainly practiced amongst non-Serer minorities)
- Government: Absolute monarchy, then traditional monarchy from 2017 – present
- Maad Saloum
  - 1494 – c. 1520: Mbegane Ndour
  - 1935–1969: Fode N'Gouye Joof
  - 2017–present: Thierno Coumba Daga Ndao
- History
  - Mbegane Ndour defeats Elibana, founds the kingdom: c. 1494
  - Annexation into French West Africa: 1867
  - 1969: Death of Maad Saloum Fode N'Gouye Joof, abolition of the monarchy
  - 2017: Re-establishment of the monarchy

The Kingdom of Saloum (Serer: Saluum or Saalum) was a Serer kingdom in present-day Senegal and parts of The Gambia. The precolonial capital was the city of Kahone. Re-established in 2017, Saloum is now a non-sovereign traditional monarchy within Senegal. Its history, geography and culture is intricately linked with the sister state, the Kingdom of Sine, and it is common to refer to them as the Sine-Saloum or the Serer Kingdoms.

== Typonymy ==
Serer oral traditions recount that the area was named Saluum/Saloum by the Maad Saloum Mbegane Ndour in the later part of the 15th century (c. 1494), named after Saalum Suwareh, the marabout of Mbegan Ndour. Alternatively, the name 'Saluum' could mean 'land of the Luum', an important family in the region.

Portuguese explorers in the 15th century referred to Saloum as the kingdom of Borçalo, a corruption of the Wolof 'Bor-ba-Saloum' for "King of Saloum" (Maad Saloum).

== History ==
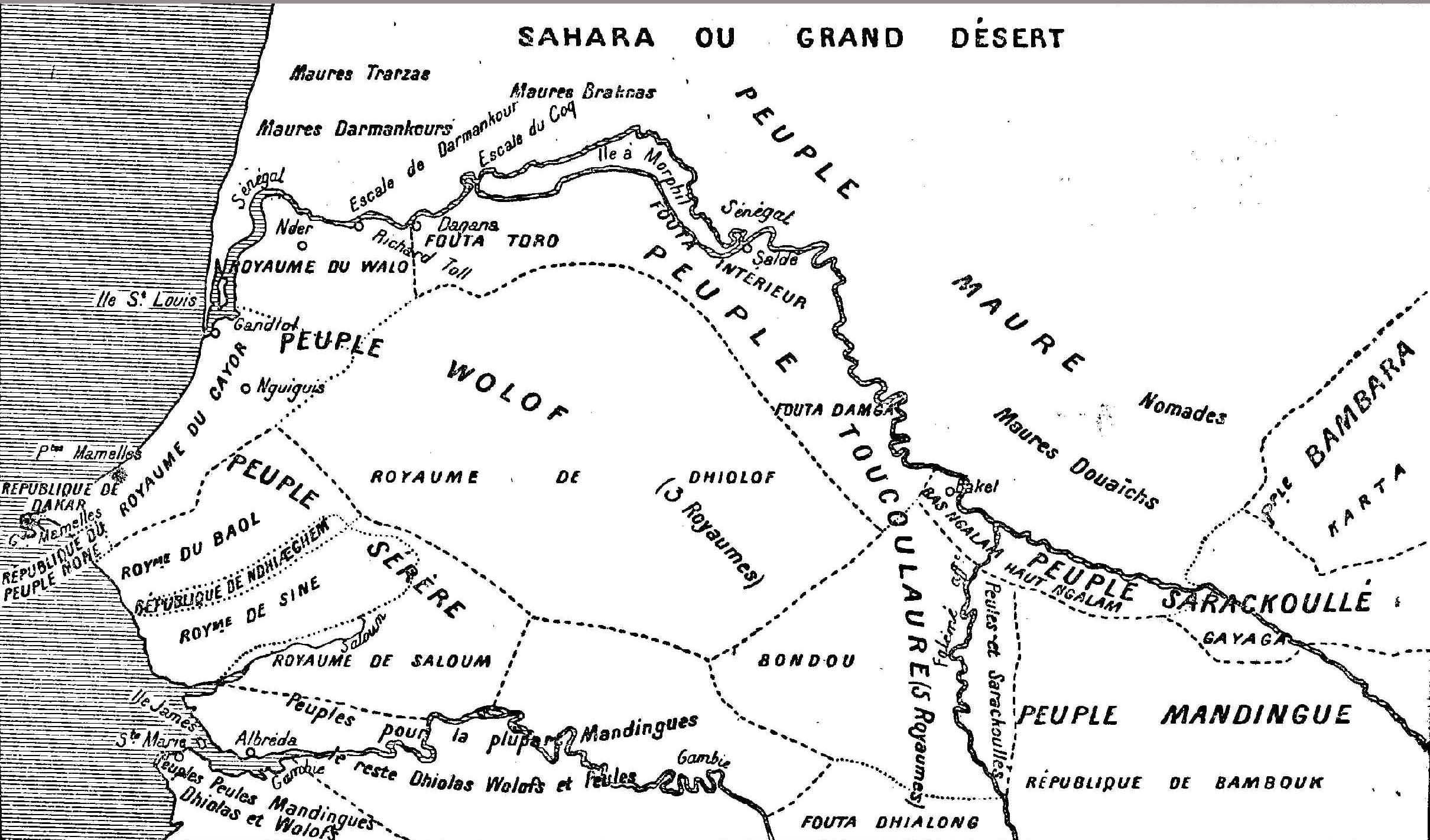
Carte des peuplades du Sénégal de l'abbé Boilat (1853): an ethnic map of Senegal at the time of French colonialism. The pre-colonial states of Baol, Sine and Saloum are arrayed along the southwest coast, with the inland areas marked "Peuple Sérère".

=== Early history ===
Saloum and the surrounding region is known for its many ancient burial mounds or "tumuli" (podoom in Serer) containing the graves of kings and others. The kingdom also has numerous mysterious stone circles whose function and history are still debated by scholars, most of which pre-date the formation of the kingdom. The Serer people who are very diverse, are noted by scholars as one of the oldest inhabitants of the Senegambia region who saw the entire region as their home. In the 11th century, the Serers of Takrur were persecuted for their Serer religious beliefs by the new Muslim convert and usurper, king War Jabi and his Muslim ally forces - resulting in the Serer exodus from Takrur. Those Serers headed south including Saloum - joining their distant Serer relatives. For more on that, see Serer medieval history.

Fall has advanced the claim that, the first inhabitants of the region, according to oral tradition, were a Mande people who immigrated from the Wagadu Empire to flee a drought, likely towards the end of the first millennium CE. The princess of Wagadou would marry into the Serer noble families such as the Joof, Njie, etc., giving birth to a Wagadou maternal dynasty in much of Serer country. For more on that, see Joof family, Teigne, and Serer maternal clans.

Before Maad Saloum Mbegan Ndour, Saloum existed in some form, but it is unclear what form it took. The area was composed a series of chiefdoms and independent villages, many of which led by Serer Lamanes and/or part of the Jolof Empire's sphere of influence. The core of what would become the Kingdom of Saloum was a Lamanic state called Mbey, with the capital at Njop. The king/chief of Mbey using the Serer noble title Maad -referred to as Maada Mbey/Maad a Mbey (as in Maad a Sinig and Maad Saloum, titles of the kings of Sine and Saloum respectively).

=== Founding ===
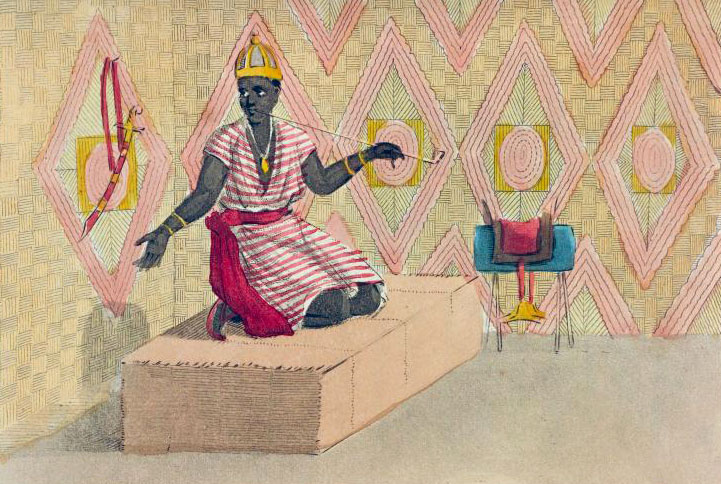
Apartment of the Maad Saloum (king of Saloum) in 1821.

In the late 15th century, Ali Elibana, a Toucouleur marabout, established himself at Njop and took control of the surrounding salt-producing region, Mbey, mostly populated by the Serer. This was a period of profound destabilization and succession disputes in the Jolof Empire, which had extended its hegemony south to the Gambia River under Biram Njeme Eler (c.1465–c.1481). While the southern and eastern parts of the region that became Saloum were under the influence of Jolof, Saloum the kingdom was never a part of the empire.

Mbegane Ndour, whose paternal roots were in the region, came to Mbey from Sine likely with the intention of carving out a kingdom for himself. Around the turn of the 16th century, he launched a religious conflict against the Muslim Elibana, strengthened by the purchase of horses and guns from European merchants on the coast. In the legend, after proving unable to overcome him on the battlefield, Ndour transformed into a snake and hid outside Elibana's mosque; when the marabout emerged from his prayers, the snake bit him, and he died. He then fought and defeated Diattara Tambedou, who was either Elibana's successor or a former ally of Ndour's. Tambedou, a Muslim Soninke, was likely a salt merchant. Control over this vital resource underpinned the conflict as much or more than religious differences.

Ndour renamed Njop Kahone, meaning 'this is the one' in Serer, and made it the capital of a kingdom modeled on his homeland, Sine. He built up his power by allying with the various smaller powers of the region, including Serer Lamanes, Soninke or Toucouleur marabouts, and local village chiefs, but he only directly controlled Mbey. At some point, he may have served as regent to the underage Maad a Sinig (King of the Kingdom of Sine).

=== Height ===
After Mbegane Ndour's death he was succeeded by Giran O Ngap, a Guelwar, but his reign was consumed by civil conflict first with local marabouts and finally with Ndour's nephew Latmenge Dielene, who poisoned him and took power. Rather than relying on a balance of alliances like his uncle had done, Latmenge Dielene built a military powerful state with clearly defined provinces run by families loyal to the Maad Saloum. He fought numerous wars to build up the power of the ruling aristocracy and impose central power and tribute on previously independent villages or statelets, including the kingdom of Niumi.

By 1566, the process of unification and centralization was completed under Maad Saloum Lat Ciloor Bajaan, who extended Saloum's power to the north bank of the Gambia and made the Kingdom of Niani pay tribute. Two districts of The Gambia retain the name Saloum today. A major part of this expansion process was the welcoming of immigrant families fleeing conflict elsewhere in the region, granting them fiefs either to extend control over uninhabited areas or ensure the loyalty of conquered regions. At its height, four major trading ports on the Gambia river fell within Saloum's zone of influence: Barra in Niumi, Iambor in Baddibu, Kaur in Saloum itself, and Kassang in Niani.

The most important offices of the state were monopolized by members of the Guelwar clan. But the multiplication of titles and the importance of trade on the Gambia gradually undermined central control.

=== Clashes with Colonialism and Islam ===
As one of the wealthiest and most stable states in the region, the Maad Saloum was able to play France and England off of each other for centuries to ensure the best terms of trade. In 1785 Saalum Sandene signed a trade treaty with the French, but the upheavals of the French Revolution and the Napoleonic Era ensured continued English dominance of the important Saloum-Saloum market. The end of the Atlantic slave trade saw the kingdom's foreign trade limited mostly to foodstuffs, which further increased the power of landowners relative to the monarchy, and pushed the ceddo (denoting followers of Serer religion in this context) warrior class to increasingly prey on their subjects.

In 1857 the French trading post at Albreda on the Gambia was given to the English in exchange for Portendick, and Saloum was left unable to balance the two colonial powers against each other. Two years later, Governor Louis Faidherbe led an expedition up the Saloum River and imposed a new treaty on the Maad Saloum.

In 1861, Maba Diakhou Bâ, a Muslim cleric and slave trader, took control of Badibu, also known as Rip, on Saloum's southern edge. Shortly afterwards, Sambou Oumanneh Touray, Maba disciple defeated and killed the Fara Sabakh and Fara Sandial, joined the two countries together (hence : Sabakh-Sandial) and ruled it. Maba soon controlled most of Saloum and part of Niumi. His forces clashed with the French and, despite a defeat, continued to attract new recruits, with the army numbering up to 11,000 fighting men. In 1864 the French recognized him as Almamy of Baddibu and Saloum, but his growing power threatened to unify Senegambia against them. An alarmed French governor Émile Pinet-Laprade marched on Saloum at the head of 1,600 regulars, 2,000 cavalry, and 4,000 volunteers and footsoldiers. At the Battle of Pathé Badiane outside of Nioro, however, the marabout forces led by Lat Dior drove the French back towards Kaolack.

As well as forcibly converting traditional states and their populations to Islam, Maba Diakhou Bâ sought to abolish the traditional caste system of the Serer states. In 1867, aided by the kings of Cayor and Jolof with their respective armies, he tried to invaded the ultra-conservative Serer Kingdom of Sine, but was defeated and killed at the Battle of Fandane-Thiouthioune. The Kingdom of Saloum, was the only Senegambian kingdom that came to the aid of its sister Serer kingdom against the Muslim ally forces in that battle.

After Maba's defeat, Saloum was incorporated into the colony of Senegal. The kings continued to hold their court in Kahone, but the city was eclipsed commercially by neighboring Kaolack. However, like the Kingdom of Sine, the royal dynasty survived up to 1969, when the last King of Saloum Fode N'Gouye Joof, and the last King of Sine Maad a Sinig Mahecor Joof died. After their deaths, both were incorporated into newly independent Senegal.

=== Restoration of the Monarchy ===
In 2017, the Serer of Saloum decided to reinstate their monarchy, and Thierno Coumba Daga Ndao was selected from the Guelowar matrilineage to succeed the throne. After a contentious election, he was crowned King on 21 May 2017 at Kahone. He is the current King of Saloum as of 2024, and the maternal uncle of the current King of Sine, Niokhobaye Fatou Diène Diouf, from the Royal House of Semou Njekeh Joof.

== People and Society ==
The core of the Kingdom of Saloum is populated mostly by the Serer, but gradually the Wolof immigrants have settled in along with the Fulas, Mandinkas, etc. Unlike the Kingdom of Sine which is more deeply rooted in "Serer-conservatism", such as the preservation of Serer religion, culture, traditions, etc., Saloum is more cosmopolitan and multi-religious. This explains why some Serer traditionalists who adhere to the tenets of Serer religion are reluctant to afford it the same religious status afforded to Sine as one of the sacred Serer holy sites, in spite of housing many of the Serer sites (see Serer ancient history).

The Serer language and Wolof are both widely spoken in Saloum. The Cangin languages are also spoken.

== Economy ==
Saloum includes flat, swampy tideland areas inland from the Saloum River delta, which allowed for a flourishing industry of salt-manufacture. The kingdom exported this highly valuable resource regionally, with Kahone as a major trade center. The coubal was a tax in kind on salt levied by the Maad Saloum. He exercised a monopoly on salt sales, and production was restricted to women to prevent rival princes from using the saltpans as a revenue source with which they could challenge the king. Control of Gambia river ports allowed the export of salt east towards the Mali Empire. The Saloum river delta was also a major center for the harvesting, preserving, and export of fish, oysters, and shellfish. Niominka traders went up and down the coast, and later Europeans and Lançados traded in the many creeks and inlets.

The economic base in the 19th and 20th centuries shifted to groundnut cultivation and trade, exporting large quantities of nuts to Europe.

Serer royal and religious titles
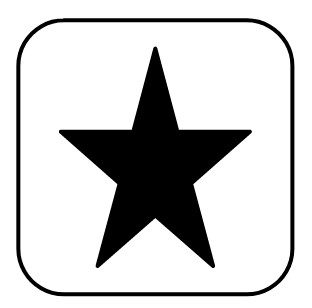
- Royal titles
- Lamane (also religious)
- Maad
- Maad a Sinig
- Maad Saloum
- Teigne
- Lingeer
- Line of succession
- Buumi
- Thilas
- Loul Religious titles
- Saltigue

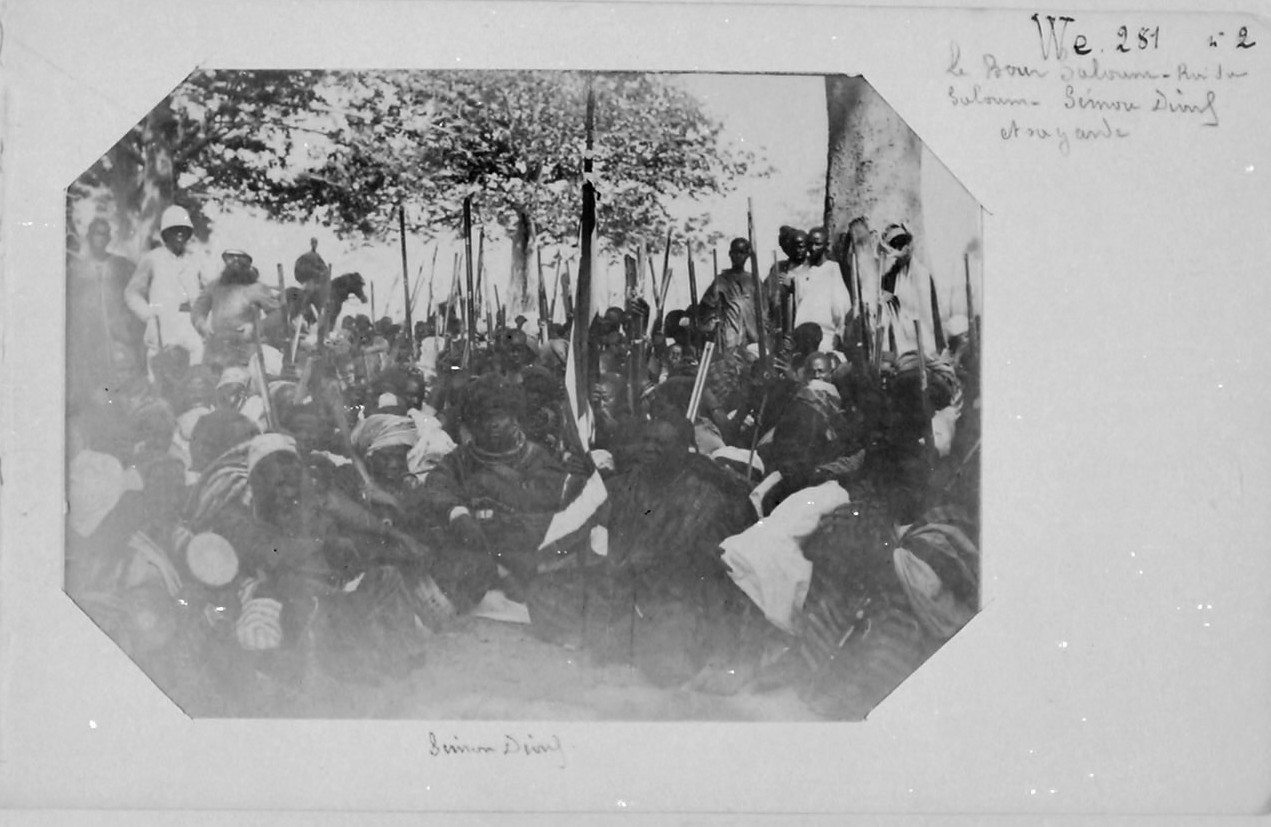
Bour Saloum Semou Diouf and his entourage in the 1890s

== Government ==
The main provinces of Saloum were: Mbey, where the Maad Saloum ruled directly; Joñik centered around Djilor; Siñi north of Kahone, ruled by the Bar Ngay descended from the Ndiaye dynasty of Jolof; Ndoucoumane east of Siñi ruled by the Ndao family, formerly the rulers of Namandirou; Kajmoor and Mandaax along the Gambia river, also ruled by Ndiayes; among other, smaller territories, sometimes ruled by marabouts. The ruling class were ethnically and culturally Serer, part of the Guelowar clan, and were known as ceddo who often exploited and raided the population. Vassals included, at various times, Badibu, Niani, Niumi, Sabakh, and Sandial. The powers and prerogatives of local subordinate rulers varied.

The great Jaraaf was the head of the council that elected the Maad Saloum, also known as the Buur in Wolof, and would rule the nation in the event of his death until his successor had been enthroned. Buur-administrators served as governors of villages and provinces on behalf of the king, assisted by Farba who were in charge of enforcing laws and dispensing justice.

== Sources ==
- Almada, André Alvares (1594) Tratado breve dos Rios de Guiné do Cabo-Verde: desde o Rio do Sanagá até aos baixos de Sant' Anna 1841 edition, Porto: Typographia Commercial Portuense. online
- Ba, Abdou Bouri. "Essai sur l’histoire du Saloum et du Rip"(avant-propos par Charles Becker and Victor Martin), Bulletin de l'IFAN, vol. 38, série B, number 4, October 1976.
- Barry, Boubacar (1998). Senegambia and the Atlantic slave trade. Cambridge, UK: Cambridge University Press.
- Becker, Charles. Vestiges historiques, trémoins matériels du passé clans les pays sereer. Dakar. 1993. CNRS - ORS TO M.
- Boulegue, Jean (2013). Les royaumes wolof dans l'espace sénégambien (XIIIe-XVIIIe siècle) (in French). Paris: Karthala Editions.
- Charles, Eunice A. (1977). Precolonial Senegal : the Jolof Kingdom, 1800-1890. Brookline, MA: African Studies Center, Boston University.
- Diouf, Niokhobaye, "Chronique du royaume du Sine", Suivie de notes sur les traditions orales et les sources écrites concernant le royaume du Sine par Charles Becker et Victor Martin. (1972). Bulletin de l'Ifan, Tome 34, Série B, n° 4, (1972), p 707 (p 5)
- Fall, Rokhaya (2022). Un espace de rencontre en Sénégambie : le Saalum (XVIe – XIXe siècle). Harmattan.
- Gravrand, Henry. "La civilisation sereer, I. Coosan". Dakar, Nouvelles Editions Africaines (1983).
- Klein, Martin (1968). Islam and Imperialism in Senegal Sine-Saloum, 1847–1914. Edinburgh University Press. ISBN 0-85224-029-5.
- Mwakikagile, Godfrey (2010). Ethnic Diversity and Integration in the Gambia: The Land, the People and the Culture. ISBN 9987932223.
- Teixera da Mota, Avelino (1946) "A descoberta da Guiné", Boletim cultural da Guiné Portuguesa, P. 1 in Vol. 1, No. 1 (Jan), p. 11-68.
- Sakho, Oumar Malle (2021). "Le sel dans la formation de l'espace du Saloum: XVIeme=XVII siecle". In Fall, Mamadou; Fall, Rokhaya; Mane, Mamadou (eds.). Bipolarisation du Senegal du XVIe - XVIIe siecle (in French). Dakar: HGS Editions. pp. 101–117.
- Sarr, Alioune. "Histoire du Sine-Saloum", Introduction, bibliographie et Notes par Charles Becker. BIFAN. vol. 46, Serie B, number 3–4, 1986–1987.
