= Medina Sabakh Arrondissement =

Medina Sabakh
- Arrondissement
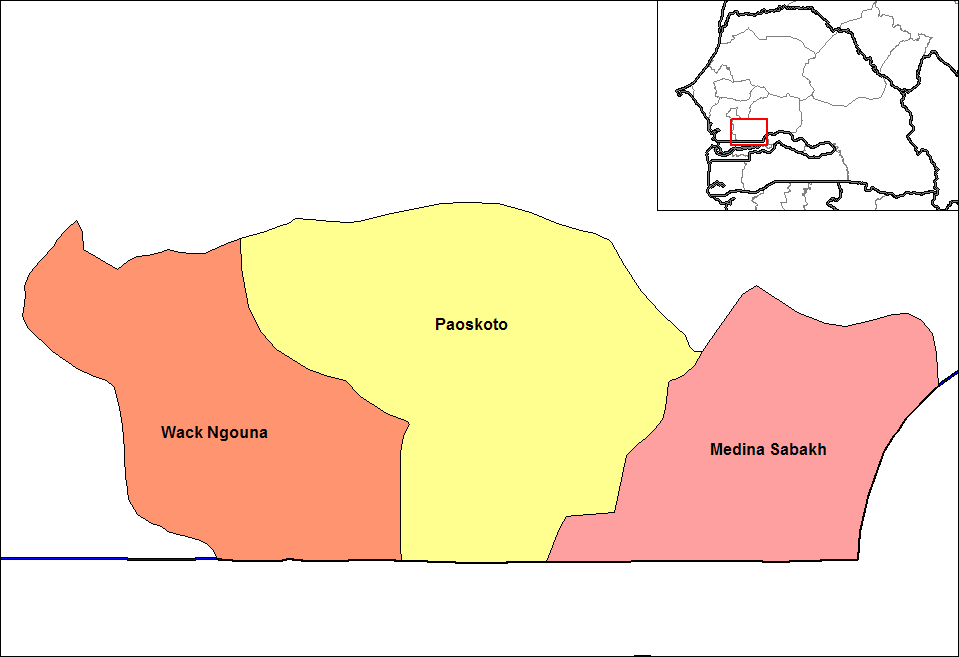
- Location in the Nioro du Rip Department
- Country: Senegal
- Region: Kaolack Region
- Department: Nioro du Rip Department
- Time zone: UTC±00:00 (GMT)

Medina Sabakh Arrondissement is an arrondissement of the Nioro du Rip Department in the Kaolack Region of Senegal.

== Subdivisions ==
The arrondissement is divided administratively into rural communities and in turn into villages.
