= Bousso (surname) =

Bousso is a surname. Notable people with the surname include:

- Mame Diarra Bousso (1833–1866), Murid saint
- Raphael Bousso (born 1971), German theoretical physicist and cosmologist
