= Wack Ngouna Arrondissement =

Coordinates: 13.7582°N 16.0628°W

Wack Ngouna
- Arrondissement
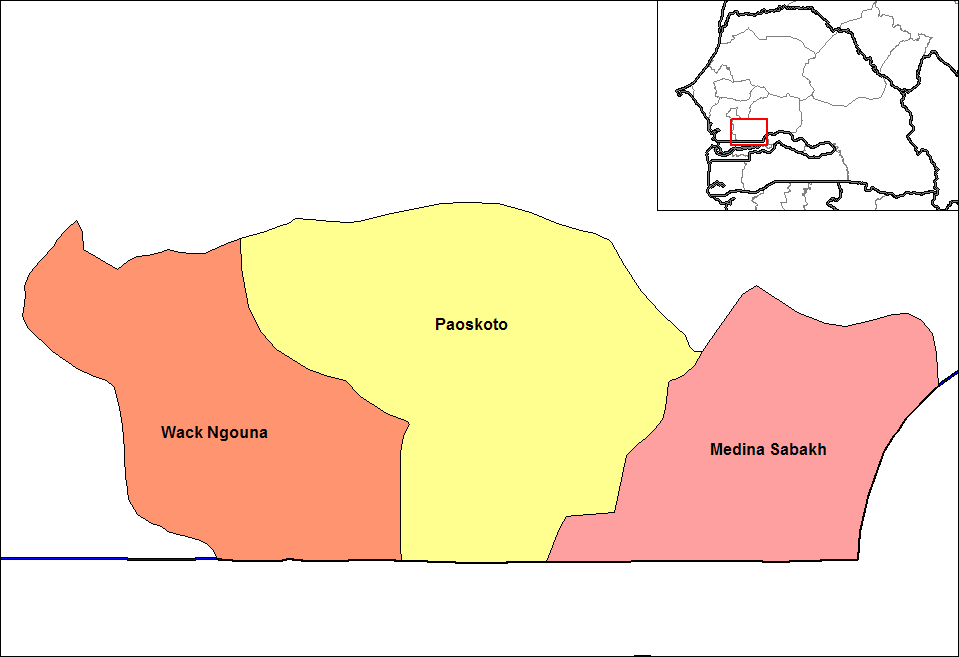
- Location in the Nioro du Rip Department
- Country: Senegal
- Region: Kaolack region
- Department: Nioro du Rip department
- Time zone: UTC±00:00 (GMT)

Wack Ngouna Arrondissement is an arrondissement of the Nioro du Rip department in the Kaolack region of Senegal.

== Subdivisions ==
The arrondissement is divided administratively into rural communities and in turn into villages.
