= Kassang =

Former town in the Gambia

Kassang Gassang Cassan, Cassao
- Location in the Gambia
- Coordinates: 13°46′N 14°56′W
- Country: The Gambia
- Local Government Area: Kuntaur
- District: Niani

Kassang, also spelled Kassan, Cassan, Cassao, or Gassang, was an important town just north of the river Gambia in the 15th, 16th, and 17th centuries. 300 km from the mouth of the river, the location was strategic as it marked the furthest point that ocean-going ships could go. It was the major river port and trading center of the Kingdom of Niani, with lancados (including the famous Ganagoga) exchanging kola, horses, beads, metal goods, cloth and more with the locals. It was also a stocking point for salt and other goods being shipped upriver to Sutukoba and beyond. The village of Kassang and its port on the riverside were surrounded by tatas and commanded by a saltigi.

In 1618, the resident Portuguese traders massacred a crew of Englishmen looking to tap into the trade of the river. In 1651, Jacob Kettler, Duke of Courland, in present-day Latvia, purchased land for a trading post in Kassang as well as at James Island, Banyon Point (now Half Die), and Jufureh.

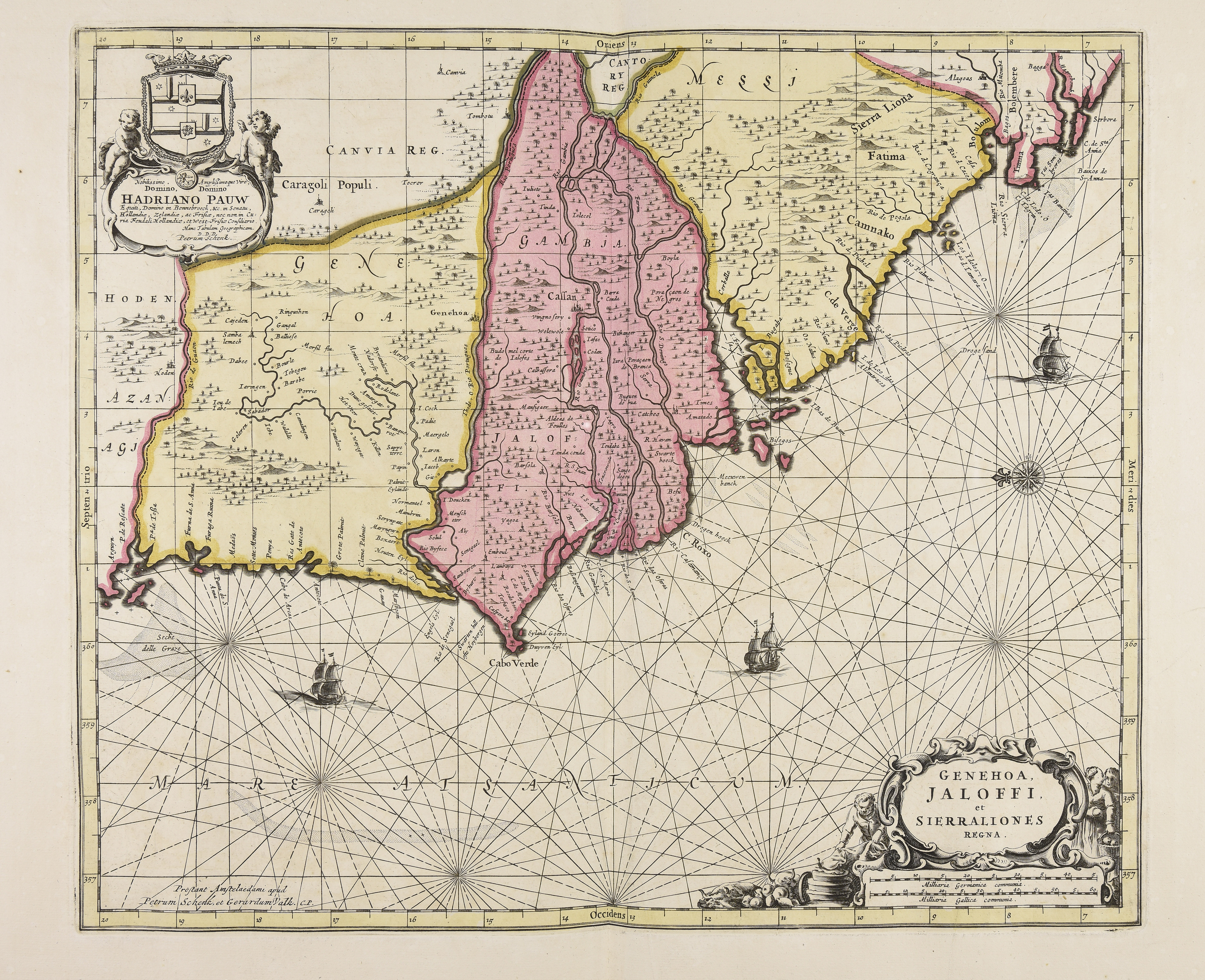
An early map of Senegambia showing Kassang (Cassan)

Kassang remained important through the end of the 17th century, when it was superseded by Kaur, further downstream. Nearby Kuntaur in turn became the most important river power in the area in the early 20th century.

== See also ==
- Gassang Forest Park, named after the town
