= Patriotic Action for Liberation =

Political party in Senegal

Patriotic Action for Liberation (in French: Action patriotique de libération, in Wolof: Dog Buumu Gaace) is a political party in Senegal.

The general secretary of the party is Amadou Moustapha Fall Ché. The party is led by a politburo and a central committee. The headquarters of the party are based in Kaolack.

The ideology of the party is Humanist Socialism. The symbol of the party is a red rose on a blue background.

The party was registered with the Senegalese authorities on October 10, 2000.

== Standpoint of Caricature issue ==
Regarding the Danish caricatures of Muhammad, the Apl condemned them as a 'provocation of the European extreme rightwing' against Islam.
