= Richard Jobson =

Richard Jobson may refer to:

- Richard Jobson (explorer), 17th-century English explorer
- Richard Jobson (footballer) (born 1963), English former footballer
- Richard Jobson (television presenter) (born 1960), filmmaker, TV presenter, and musician, formerly of Skids
