= Nioro du Rip department =

Coordinates: 13°45′N 15°48′W

Nioro du Rip
- Department
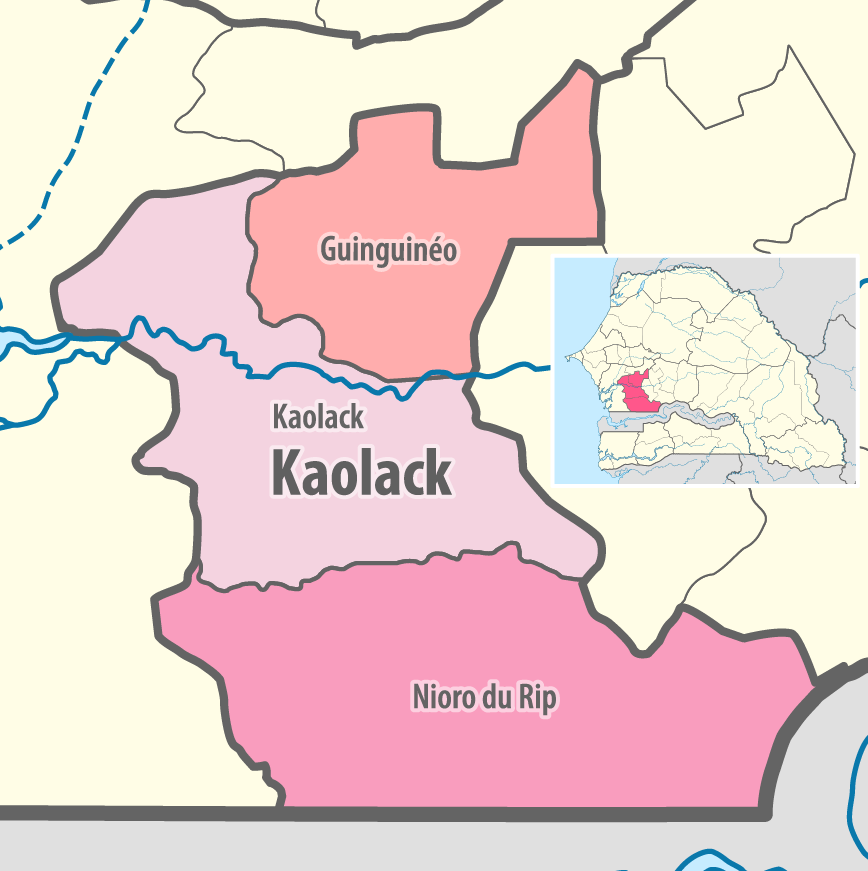
- Country: Senegal
- Region: Kaolack region
- Capital: Nioro du Rip

Area
  - Total: 2,277 km^{2} (879 sq mi)

Population (2023)
  - Total: 513,181
  - Density: 225.4/km^{2} (583.7/sq mi)
- Time zone: UTC+0 (GMT)

Nioro du Rip department is one of the 46 departments of Senegal, located in the Kaolack region.

The principal settlement is the commune of Nioro du Rip. Rural districts (communautés rurales) comprise:

- Médina Sabakh Arrondissement
  - Kayemor
  - Médina Sabakh
  - Ngayène
- Paoskoto Arrondissement
  - Gainthe Kaye
  - Paos Koto
  - Porokhane
  - Taïba Niassène
  - Dabaly
  - Darou Salam
- Wack Ngouna Arrondissement
  - Keur Maba Diakhou
  - Keur Madongo
  - Ndramé Escale
  - Wack Ngouna

The total population in 2005 was estimated at 282,175.

== Historic sites ==
- Fortification of Maba Diakhou Bâ at Nioro du Rip
- Mausoleum of Mame Diarra Bousso at Porokhane
- Wells of Mame Diarra Bousso
- Tomb of Matar Kalla Dramé at Ndimb Dramé
- Megalithic site at Sine Ngayène
- Megalithic site of Mbolop Tobé in the village of Konomba
- Megalithic site of Sine Wanar
- Mosque of Kabakoto
