= Kahone =

Kahone Ka-Woon
- Town and commune
- Location in Senegal
- Coordinates: 14°09′41″N 16°01′51″W
- Country: Senegal
- Region: Kaolack
- Department: Kaolack
- Ka-Woon: 14th century

Area
  - Town and commune: 8.034 km^{2} (3.102 sq mi)

Population (2023 census)
  - Town and commune: 26,376
  - Density: 3,283/km^{2} (8,503/sq mi)
- Time zone: UTC+0 (GMT)

Kahone (Serer proper: Ka-Woon (variations: Kawoon or Kawon)–meaning the ancestor, "the one who was" in Serer)) is a town and urban commune near Kaolack, Senegal. It was the capital of the pre-colonial Kingdom of Saloum and is a center of Serer culture and history.

== Toponymy and ancient history ==
Kahone takes its name from a Serer religious site and place of worship known in Serer as "Ka-Woon", which means the ancestor, "the one who was". The Serers venerated this founding Serer ancestor, and the name was given to the future capital of the Serer Kingdom of Saloum. The name predates the Guelwar maternal dynasty and Mbegane Ndour, a member of that matriclan and founder of the Kingdom of Saloum, and takes its name from the Serer sacred site Ka-Woon.

== Medieval history ==
In the 14th century, the Mandinka Guelowar clan migrated from Kaabu northwards after losing a succession dispute. This matriclan, according to the claim advanced by Rokhaya Fall, founded a number of small chiefdoms in the area north of the Gambia River. Fall went on to write that, the home of Kéno Mbèye, one of the Guelowar leaders, was chosen as the meeting place where any problems could be discussed, and so it was called "Filagui diobé", meaning meeting place in the Mandinka language. This eventually became Njoob, capital of a state called Mbey.

Rokhaya Fall didn't realise that the tradition she was reporting is actually of Kina/Kin/Kon O Mev/Meo Mane (Manneh), who was a royal princess and sister of Sino-Méou and Kulaar/Koular-o-Méou Mane (and Maad a Sinig Maysa Wali Jaxateh Manneh)– the three sisters and maternal ancestors of the three Guelouar families of Saloum. The Serer country "Mbey" existed before the Guelowar's arrival. Kéno Mbèye (or any of its spelling variations including Kena Mbey) takes her name from the Serer country she settled in. It is only a nickname which does not mean anything in Serer other than "she who stays in Saalum (= Mbey)."

In the late 15th century, Mbey and its prosperous salt works fell under the influence of a Toucouleur marabout named Elibana. The Siin-Siin leader Mbegane Ndour attacked and killed him, establishing the Serer kingdom of Saloum and renaming the capital Kahone, meaning 'this is the one' in Serer. The city remained the political and religious center of Saloum for the next several centuries.

Kahone was originally a far more important town than neighboring Kaolack, but the roles have been reversed in the 20th century as Kaolack developed into a port and railroad hub. Kahone has been reduced to a sub-prefecture of Kaolack.

== Culture and Economy ==
It is primarily agricultural, but it is participating in industrial development plans. Also, the town is pursuing increased tourism based on its history and culture. An annual royal festival is celebrated in which the O Maad (Serer king), Djaraaf (Serer prime minister) and other dignitaries meet to decide kingdom issues and hold pageants celebrating the history of Saloum and the Serer people. There is a mosque and a Catholic missions in Kahone. There are numerous ancient tombs, stone circles and megaliths in the vicinity as well as large burial mounds implanted with baobab trees.

Kahone is routinely involved in many administrative territorial disputes with neighboring communes, always emphasizing its earlier importance.

In 2007, according to official estimates, Kahone had 5,852 inhabitants.

== See also ==
- Kingdom of Saloum
- Kingdom of Sine
- Serer people
