= Kaur, The Gambia =

Kaur
- Location in the Gambia
- Coordinates: 13°42′N 15°20′W
- Country: The Gambia
- Division: Central River Division
- District: Lower Saloum

Population
  - Ethnicities: Mandinka; Wolof
- Time zone: UTC+0 (GMT)

Kaur, also spelled Kauur or Kawur, is a town in the Lower Saloum district of the Central River Division of The Gambia.

== Toponymy ==
According to local legend, the village was named by Maad Saloum Mbegane Ndour when he told his followers to take their cattle to the river to drink, saying in Fula “Ngareen Kawreen Dandeh Mayo”, meaning let us meet near the river, hence the name Kaur (from the word Kawreen). Etymological reconstruction, on the other hand, points to 'Kaur' being a Bainuk name, dating to a period before the Mandinka cultural expansion into the area that was complete by the 15th century.

== History ==
According to local tradition, Kaur was founded over 800 years ago by the brothers Baba and Karim Diané, Jakhanke traders. Early inhabitants may have included the Bainuk people. Located near the uppermost edge of the mangrove ecosystem, Kaur was historically one of the most important trade towns on the Gambia River. A part of the Kingdom of Saloum since at least the mid-15th century, it was described by Andre Donelha and Francis Moore in their writings. Kaur was located in the province of Kajmoor.

== People ==
- Isatou Touray
