= Ganagoga =

Portuguese trader and warlord in West Africa

Ganagoga (literally, The Man who Speaks all the Languages in Biafada, born João Ferreira) was a New Christian who made a career as a lançado in West Africa in the decades around 1600.

João Ferreira was born in Crato, Portugal to a Jewish family. His facility with languages helped him establish himself as the principal Portuguese trader on the Gambia River, being particularly close to the lineage head of Casão. This eventually took him to the court of the Silatigi of the Denianke Kingdom, where he converted to Islam, acquired significant influence and married one of the ruler's daughters.

According to the oral testimonies gathered by Teixeira da Mota, in the Silatigi's service, Ganagoga supposedly (Note: Teixeira da Mota deducted Ganagoga was the leader of the lançados that occupied Bambuk but did not provide any physical evidence) led a band of fellow lançados to conquer the gold-producing region of Bambuk in the last decades of the 16th century. After initial success, the Portuguese were massacred by the local inhabitants, but it is unclear if Ganagoga met his fate there as well.
