= 1618 English expedition to the Gambia River =

1618 military expedition

English expedition to the Gambia River
- Part of the European colonisation of Africa
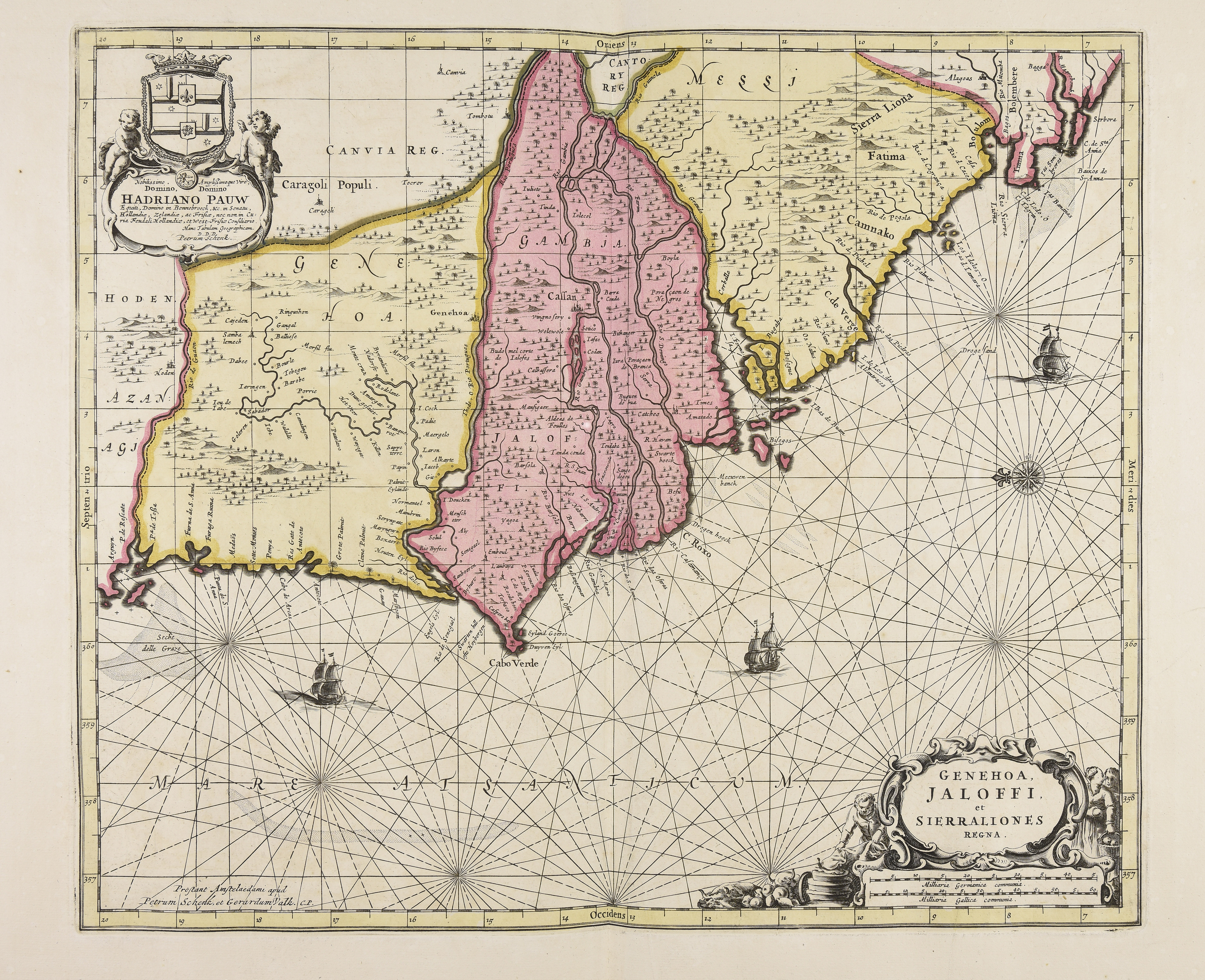
- Late 17th-century map of the Gambia
Date	September 1618
Location	Gassan, the Gambia
Result	Portuguese victory

Belligerents
Portugal	England

Commanders and leaders
(Kingdom of Portugal) Hector Nunez	(England) George Thompson †

Strength
Unknown	2 ships

Casualties and losses
Unknown	Most killed

The English expedition to the Gambia River was a failed expedition led by George Thompson with the objective of opening trade with Timbuktu.

== Background ==
Letters patent granting exclusive trading rights in the Gambia River were issued to various English adventurers in 1598, 1612, and 1632, but it wasn't until 1618 that the English made their first attempt to explore the river. This expedition was led by George Thompson, sent by the London Company of Adventurers with the objective of opening trade with Timbuktu.

== Expedition ==
Leaving his ship Catherine at Gassan, Thompson proceeded with a small party in boats up the Neriko river. During his absence, the crew of the Catherine was massacred by Portuguese lancado slave traders led by Hector Nunez. All Englishmen present at Gassan were killed in the surprise assault. The local population did not participate, but rather sheltered and protected the survivors.

Some of Thompson's party managed to return overland to Cap Vert and subsequently back to England. Meanwhile, Thompson remained in the Gambia with seven of his crew but was killed, either by one of the Englishmen after a sudden quarrel or by natives.

== Aftermath ==
Another expedition under Richard Jobson was later dispatched, which seized Portuguese shipping in retaliation for the massacre. Jobson also traveled to Neriko, reporting the commercial potential of the river. However, both his and previous expeditions resulted in significant losses, leading patentees to abandon their attempts in the Gambia and refocus on the Gold Coast.

== Bibliography ==
- Gray, J.M (1940). The History of the Gambia. London: Cambridge University Press. ISBN 978-1-107-51196-5.
- Johnston, Harry H. (1899). A history of the colonization of Africa by alien races (PDF). University Press.
