= Ken Bugul =

Senegalese writer

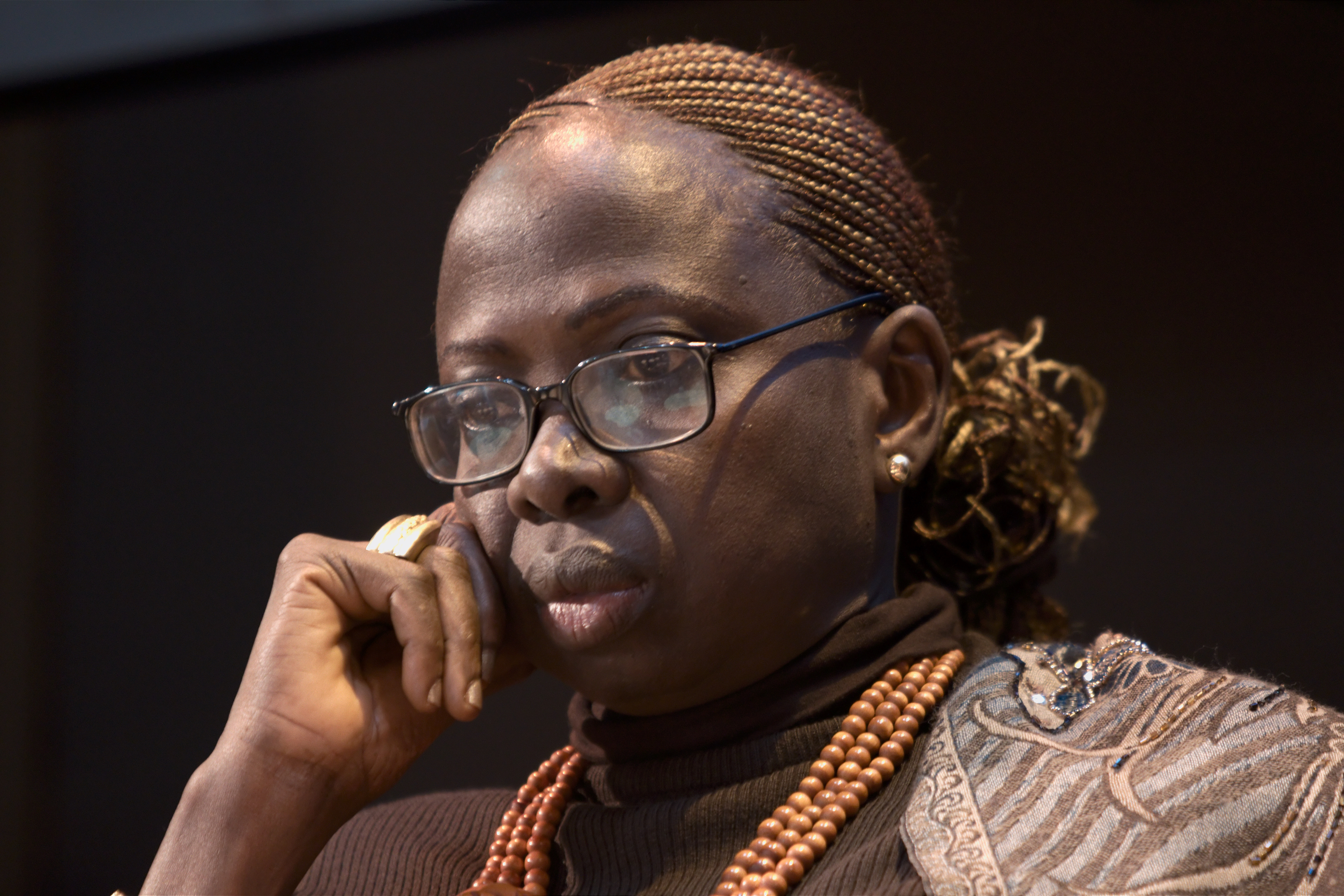
- Ken Bugul in March 2010
- Born: Mariètou Mbaye Biléoma; 1947 (age 78–79); Ndoucoumane, Senegal
- Education: Malick Sy Secondary School, Thiès
- Occupation: Novelist
- Writing career
- Language: French
- Genre: Novel
- Notable works: Le Baobab Fou (The Abandoned Baobab), Riwan ou le Chemin de Sable
- Notable awards: Grand prix littéraire d'Afrique noire (2000)

Ken Bugul (born 1947) is the pen name of Senegalese Francophone novelist Mariètou Mbaye Biléoma. In the Wolof language, her pen name means "one who is unwanted".

== Background ==
Bugul was born 1947 in Ndoucoumane. She was raised in a polygamous environment, born to a father who was an 85-year-old marabout. After completing her elementary education in her native village, she studied at the Malick Sy Secondary School in Thiès. After a year in Dakar, she obtained a scholarship that allowed her to continue studying in Belgium. In 1980 she returned to her home, where she became the 28th wife in the harem of the village marabout. After his death, she returned to the big city. From 1986 to 1993, Bugul worked for the NGO IPPF (International Planned Parenthood Federation) in Nairobi, Kenya; Brazzaville, Congo; and Lomé, Togo, and served as the head of the organization's African region section. She subsequently married a doctor from Benin and gave birth to a daughter. Today she lives and works in Senegal. From July to December 2017 Ken Bugul was the 14th Writer in Residence in Zürich.

Bugul's literary reputation has varied from place to place. She was awarded the Grand prix littéraire d'Afrique noire for her novel Riwan ou le Chemin de Sable in 2000, but is better known among American readers for her novel The Abandoned Baobab, which is her only book to date to have been translated into English. Among other themes, the work deals with and critiques African colonialism. On the question of The Abandoned Baobab's autobiographical nature, Bugul has said of the novel, as well as of the subsequent Cendres et Braises and Riwan ou Le chemin de sable, "All three books mirror the very deep and radical experiences I went through".

== Works ==
- Le Baobab Fou (1982); translated into English as The Abandoned Baobab: The Autobiography of a Senegalese Woman (1991)
- Cendres et braises (1994); "Ashes and Embers"
- Riwan ou le Chemin de Sable (1999); "Riwan; or, the Sandy Track"
- La Folie et la mort (2000); "Madness and Death"
- De l'autre côté du regard (2002); "As Seen From the Other Side"
- Rue Félix-Faure (2005)
- La pièce d'or (2005); "The Gold Coin"
- Mes hommes à moi (2008)
- Aller et Retour (2014)
- Cacophonie (2014)
- Le Trio bleu (2022)
