= Barrakunda Falls =

Waterfall in Senegal

The Barrakunda Falls or Barra Kunda Falls is a waterfall located in the Tambacounda region of Senegal, 500 kilometres (300 mi) upstream from the mouth of the Gambia River.

Because the falls limit river travel in the dry season, they were an important milestone and obstacle for European explorers such as Richard Jobson and Richard Graves MacDonnell intent on reaching the interior. The village of Barrakunda, a part of the Kingdom of Wuli, occasionally hosted European trading posts from as early as 1651.

== See also ==
- List of waterfalls
