= Adji Bousso Dieng =

Senegalese computer scientist and statistician

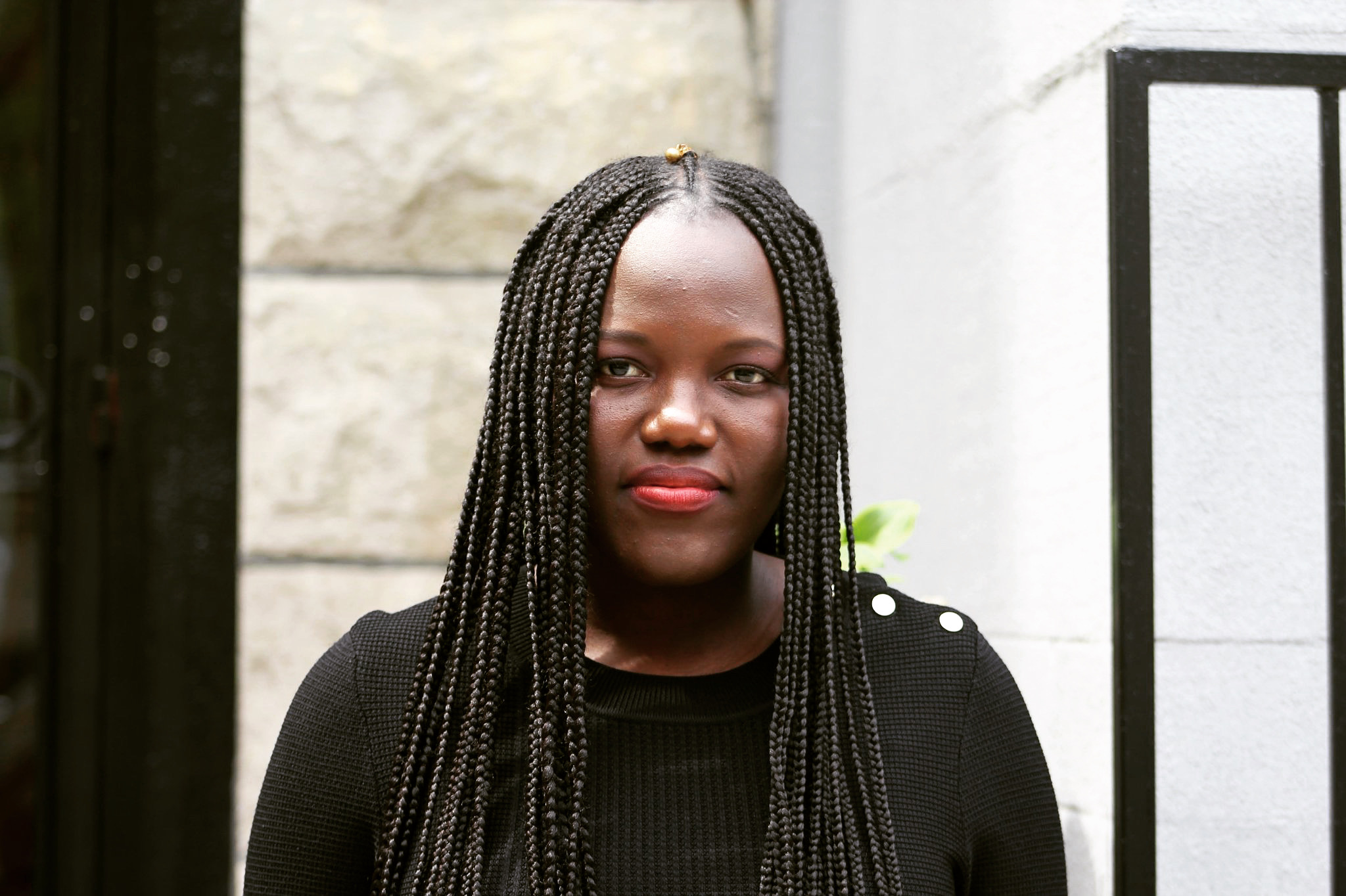
- Born: Kaolack, Senegal
- Education: Columbia University; Cornell University; Télécom ParisTech; Lycée Henri-IV
- Known for: Deep Probabilistic Graphical Modeling, Founder of The Africa I Know
- Awards: Google PhD Fellowship in Machine Learning, Rising Star in Machine Learning, Columbia GSAS Outstanding Recent Alumni Award, Columbia University Dean Fellowship, Cornell Institute for African Development Fellowship, Savage Award
- Scientific career
- Fields: Artificial Intelligence, Computer Science, Statistics
- Workplaces: Google Brain; Princeton University
- Doctoral advisor: David Blei, John Paisley
- Website: https://adjiboussodieng.org/

Adji Bousso Dieng is a Senegalese computer scientist and statistician working in the field of Artificial Intelligence. Her research bridges probabilistic graphical models and deep learning to discover meaningful structure from unlabelled data. She is currently an Artificial Intelligence Research Scientist at Google Brain in Mountain View, California. In 2021, she started her tenure-track faculty position at Princeton University, becoming the first Black female faculty member in the School of Engineering and Applied Science as well as the first Black faculty member ever in the Department of Computer Science. Dieng recently founded the non-profit “The Africa I Know” (TAIK) with the goal to inspire young Africans to pursue careers in STEM and AI by showcasing African role models, informing the general public about developments in STEM and AI by Africans, and educating the general public about the rich history of Africa.

== Early life and education ==
Dieng was born and raised in Kaolack, Senegal. Her father never attended school, and her mother started but did not complete high school. Dieng was one of 15 siblings, and to support the family, her parents owned a business selling fabric. Her father died when she was four years old, yet her mother still ensured that education was a priority in the family. Dieng attended Kaolack's public schools for both elementary and high school.

During high school, Dieng was recognized for her academic achievements. She won one of the prizes for the Senegalese Olympiad ("Concours Général") in Philosophy, was selected to participate in the 2005 Excellence camp organized by the Pathfinder Foundation for Education and Development, a non-profit founded by Cheick Modibo Diarra, and was subsequently selected to participate in a competitive exam organized for African girls in partnership between the Central Bank for West African States and the Pathfinder Foundation. She received a scholarship to study abroad after winning this competition.

While abroad, Dieng attended Lycée Henri IV, a public secondary school located in Paris. She then attended Télécom ParisTech, a top French public institution of higher education and research of engineering located in Palaiseau, France. Dieng spent her third year of Telecom ParisTech's curriculum at Cornell University. In 2013 she graduated from Télécom ParisTech, earning her Diplome d'ingenieur (a degree in Engineering from France's Grandes Ecoles system). She was also awarded a Master in Applied Statistics from Cornell University in Ithaca, New York.

After working at the World Bank for one year, Dieng started her PhD in Statistics at Columbia University. Dieng worked with David Blei and John Paisley to bridge Probabilistic Graphical Modeling and Deep Learning with the goal of discovering meaningful patterns from unlabelled data for applications in natural language processing, computer vision, and healthcare. Dieng's doctoral work has received various forms of recognition including the Google PhD Fellowship in Machine Learning, the Savage Award for Applied Methodology (the first Black woman to win this award since it was established in 1977), and a Rising Star in Machine Learning nomination by the University of Maryland. Dieng was also the second black woman to graduate from the department of Statistics at Columbia University.

== Career and research ==
In 2019, Dieng joined Google Brain as a Research Scientist in Artificial Intelligence (AI). Prior to her work at Google, Dieng interned at many major companies in AI such as Microsoft Research in Seattle, DeepMind in London, and she also worked with Yann LeCun at Facebook AI Research. In 2013, Dieng accepted a position as a Junior Professional Associate at the World Bank working on risk modeling in the Department of Market and Counterparty Risk. She left the World Bank the following summer, in 2014, after being awarded a Columbia University Dean Fellowship to start a PhD in Statistics. She remains at Google Brain in a part-time capacity.

In 2021, Dieng joined the Department of Computer Science at Princeton University as a tenure-track Assistant Professor. She is the first Black faculty in Computer Science in Princeton's history, the first Black woman tenure-track faculty in Princeton's School of Engineering, and the second Black woman tenure-track faculty in Computer Science across the Ivy League.

At Princeton University, Dieng founded the Vertaix research lab, which focuses on the intersection of artificial intelligence (AI) and the natural sciences. The models and algorithms developed are motivated by problems in those domains and contribute to advancing methodological research in AI. As part of her research activities in Vertaix, Dieng leverages tools in statistical machine learning and deep learning in developing methods for learning with the data, of various modalities, arising from the natural sciences. As part of this research, Dieng is co-PI on a grant from the NSF.

Dieng is also an AI2050 Early Career Fellow from Schmidt Futures As part of this fellowship, she is drawing inspiration from the way ecologists measure biodiversity to design a method to score an AI model's diversity and quantify how biased the model is.

Dieng has authored/co-authored several papers published in AI venues such as NeurIPS, ICML, ICLR, AISTATS, and TACL.

=== Selected Papers ===
- Friedman, Dan, and Adji Bousso Dieng. "The Vendi Score: A Diversity Evaluation Metric for Machine Learning." (2022). This paper introduces a novel framework to measure the diversity of an AI model and to detect bias, which agrees with previous methodologies but generalizes and outperforms them.

== Advocacy ==
Dieng, originally from Kaolack, Senegal, has lived on three continents but remains a vocal advocate for her home continent, Africa. In May 2022, at the yearly Conference of African Ministers in Dakar, she made the case for the urgency of STEM education in Africa and spoke about the infrastructure needed to enable that, talking about the need for "pragmatic unity" in additional contexts beyond just trade. She was also one the five young Africans invited on a panel to discuss the role of younger people in the decade of action. Both invitations were from the United Nations' Economic Commission for Africa (UNECA).

=== The Africa I Know ===
Dieng is the founder of the non-profit called “The Africa I Know”, with the mission to positively change the narrative about Africa and provide opportunities to young Africans. Dieng noticed the inaccurate portrayal of Africa in the media, which was further accentuated during the COVID-19 global crisis. Another goal of the initiative is to provide role models to young Africans, who often grow up without seeing role models that look like them due to a lack of visibility. The majority of people do not know about the rich history of STEM and AI developments made possible by Africans. TAIK inspires young Africans to follow careers in STEM and AI, informs people about the contributions in STEM and AI by Africans, and educates about the rich history of Africa. Since its founding in 2020, TAIK has grown to non-profit with 12 employees and thousands of followers across several social media platforms.

== Awards and honors ==
- 2023 - Received Columbia University's Graduate School of Arts and Sciences' Outstanding Recent Alumni Award
- 2022 - Named AI2050 Early Career Fellow from Schmidt Futures
- 2022 - Received the 2022 Annie T. Randall award
- 2020 - Named one of the 100 Most Influential Young Africans
- 2020 - Received the Savage Award, Applied Methodology, for her thesis "Deep Probabilistic Graphical Modeling"
- 2019 - Rising Star in Machine Learning (University of Maryland)
- 2019 - Google PhD Fellowship in Machine Learning
- 2016 - Microsoft Azure Research Award
- 2014 - Columbia University Dean Fellowship
- 2013 - Cornell Institute for African Development Fellowship
- 2007 - Pathfinder Foundation Scholarship
- 2006 - Senegalese Government Excellence Scholarship
- 2006 - Laureate du Concours General (Senegalese Olympiad, Philosophy)

== Select publications ==
- A. B. Dieng, F. J. R. Ruiz, and D. M. Blei. Topic Modeling in Embedding Spaces. Transactions of the Association for Computational Linguistics (TACL), 2020
- A. B. Dieng, Y. Kim, A. M. Rush, and D. M. Blei. Avoiding Latent Variable Collapse With Generative Skip Models. Artificial Intelligence and Statistics (AISTATS), 2019
- A. B. Dieng, R. Ranganath, J. Altosaar, and D. M. Blei. Noisin: Unbiased Regularization for Recurrent Neural Networks. International Conference on Machine Learning (ICML), 2018
- A. B. Dieng, C. Wang, J. Gao, and J. W. Paisley. TopicRNN: A Recurrent Neural Network with Long Range Semantic Dependency. International Conference on learning Representation (ICLR), 2017
- A. B. Dieng, D. Tran, R. Ranganath, J. W. Paisley and D. M. Blei. Variational Inference via χ Upper Bound Minimization. Neural Information Processing Systems (NIPS), 2017
