= Kaolack =

Kaolack كاولاك
- City
- Main Street in Kaolack

- Location within Senegal
- Coordinates: 14°09′54″N 16°04′32″W
- Country: Senegal
- Region: Kaolack Region
- Department: Kaolack Department
- Elevation: 5.5 m (18 ft)

Population (2023 census)
  - Total: 298,904
- Time zone: UTC+00:00 (GMT)

Kaolack (Arabic: كاولاك; Wolof: Kawlax) is a city with a population of 298,904 (2023 census) on the north bank of the Saloum River about 100 kilometres (62 mi) from its mouth and the N1 road in Senegal. It is the capital of the Kaolack Region, which borders The Gambia to the south. Kaolack is an important regional market town and is Senegal's main peanut trading and processing center. As the center of the Ibrahimiyya branch of the Tijaniyyah Sufi order founded by Ibrayima Ñas, it is also a major center of Islamic education. The Leona Niassene mosque (right) in Kaolack is one of the largest and best known in Senegal.

== History ==
Kaolack is the successor city to Kahone, historic capital of the kingdom of Saloum. Originally marked by a sacred tree on the right bank of the Saloum River facing the island of Kouyong, Kahone consisted of a number of distinct neighborhoods separated by open fields, each under the jurisdiction of a different dignitary or official. Kaolack, 8 kilometres (5.0 mi) downriver, was one of these.

One legend holds that it was founded by Sega and Massar, two brothers of Fulani origin from Macina in today's Mali. Sega’s son, Alioune Mboutou Sow, later served as the Chef de Canton of Kaolack. The Mboutou family house still stands in the middle of the town centre. Mboutou Sow's daughter Ramatoulaye (Rahmat'oullah) was given in marriage to the son of Amadou Bamba, hence the saying Kaolack worrou Mboutou (Kaolack, Mboutou's fiefdom). An alternative telling is that Kaolack was founded by a princess of Baol who took shelter there under the protection of the Maad Saloum Mbegan Ndour, whom she later married, and founded the traditional cult of the West African Nile monitor, known as mbossé in Wolof, the totem of the city. Mboutou Sow arrived later, and became chief through his erudition.

French interests in the Saloum River increased in the early 19th century as legitimate articles of trade were sought to replace trade in slaves. By mid-century, peanut production had been introduced to the kingdom of Saloum and, with the permission of its king, a fortified factory was established by the French on the riverfront at Kaolack, more favorably placed for shipping than Kahone. They laid out a first grid of lots in 1860, in what would become the city center or "Escale" neighborhood. The construction of a rail spur from the port to the Dakar-Niger line in 1911 caused the town to boom as a peanut processing and export center. Its population grew rapidly, rising from 5,600 in 1925 to 44,000 in 1934.

It is at this time that Kaolack became an important center for the Tijaniyyah Sufi order, with Allaaji Abdulaay Ñas opening a first major zâwiyah, or “lodge”, in the Leona neighborhood in 1910. His son Ibrahim Niass moved the community, known as the Jamāʿat al-fayḍa (lit. 'The Community of the Divine Flood'), to a new suburb of Kaolack called Madina Baye in the early 1930s, now a part of the city itself.

Today, there is a peanut oil processing plant with its own port facilities in the downstream suburb of Lyndiane, while salt pans across the Saloum river constitute the city’s only other major industrial activity.

== Climate ==
Kaolack has a hot semi-arid climate (Köppen climate classification: BSh), with a short rainy season and a lengthy dry season.

Climate data for Kaolack (1991–2020)
Month	Jan	Feb	Mar	Apr	May	Jun	Jul	Aug	Sep	Oct	Nov	Dec	Year
Mean daily maximum °C (°F)	35.1 (95.2)	37.3 (99.1)	39.7 (103.5)	40.8 (105.4)	40.2 (104.4)	37.4 (99.3)	34.8 (94.6)	33.5 (92.3)	33.7 (92.7)	36.3 (97.3)	37.5 (99.5)	35.6 (96.1)	36.8 (98.2)
Mean daily minimum °C (°F)	18.3 (64.9)	19.9 (67.8)	21.0 (69.8)	21.8 (71.2)	23.0 (73.4)	24.7 (76.5)	25.2 (77.4)	24.9 (76.8)	24.5 (76.1)	24.7 (76.5)	21.6 (70.9)	19.1 (66.4)	22.4 (72.3)
Record low °C (°F)	11.5 (52.7)	12.5 (54.5)	15.0 (59.0)	15.8 (60.4)	15.0 (59.0)	16.5 (61.7)	21.0 (69.8)	20.0 (68.0)	17.5 (63.5)	19.7 (67.5)	15.8 (60.4)	12.4 (54.3)	11.5 (52.7)
Average precipitation mm (inches)	0.9 (0.04)	0.6 (0.02)	0.0 (0.0)	0.0 (0.0)	1.7 (0.07)	36.0 (1.42)	117.9 (4.64)	238.5 (9.39)	190.5 (7.50)	43.6 (1.72)	0.9 (0.04)	0.0 (0.0)	630.6 (24.83)
Average precipitation days (≥ 1.0 mm)	0.1	0.1	0.0	0.0	0.2	2.8	8.7	13.8	12.1	4.0	0.2	0.0	42.0
Mean monthly sunshine hours	260	257	295	297	298	258	248	233	228	260	255	233	3,122
Mean daily sunshine hours	8.4	9.1	9.5	9.9	9.6	8.6	8.0	7.5	7.6	8.4	8.5	7.5	8.5
Source 1: NOAA
Source 2: Deutscher Wetterdienst (sunshine)

== Neighbourhoods ==
Among Kaolack's many neighbourhoods are:

- Lewna (Léona in French), which includes much of the city center. It includes Lewna Ñaseen (Léona Niassène in French), the headquarters of the branch of the Tijānī Islamic order founded in 1910 by Allaaji Abdulaay Ñas after his exile in Banjul, Gambia. But now the Tijānī Islamic Order is held by the eldest son of Mame Khalifa who was the oldest son of Allaji Abdoulaye Niass.
- Jaleñ (Dialègne in French), between Lewna Ñaseen and Medina Mbàbba.
- Medina Mbàbba (Médina Mbaba in French), also called "Medina I", named after Baabakar Njaay, nicknamed "Mbàbba Njaay," who was the Serer chief of the village when it was incorporated into Kaolack.
- Medina Baay (Médina Baye in French), also called "Medina II", on the northeast edge of the city. It is the center of the Ibrāhīmiiya branch of the Tijānī order founded in 1930 by Allaaji Abdulaay Ñas's son, Ibrayima Ñas, known to his followers as "Baay" ("Father" in Wolof). The name in Arabic means "The City of Baay."
- Saam (Sam in French), west of Medina Baay in the north of Kaolack, also founded by Ibrayima Ñas. Saam was originally designated as the fields and orchards of Ibrayima Ñas's disciples, but since the 1970s the trees have been replaced by houses.
- Ndoorong (Ndorong in French), west of Saam, founded by Bashiru Mbàkke and his Murid disciples.
- Coofog (Thiofoke in French), north of Saam, which existed before Kaolack as a Serer village ruled by the Guelowar dynasty.

== International relations ==
=== Twin towns — Sister cities ===
Kaolack is twinned with:

- Aosta, Italy
- Mérignac, France
- Memphis, United States

== Notable people ==
- Adji Bousso Dieng, computer scientist and statistician
- Jamal Thiaré, footballer

== See also ==
- Railway stations in Senegal
