= Richard Jobson (explorer) =

English explorer of Ethiopia and the Gambia River

- Occupation: explorer
- Known for: 1620–1621 voyage to the Gambia River
- Notable work: The Golden Trade

Richard Jobson (fl. 1620–1623) was an English explorer of West Africa. He is only known from his writings on his 1620–1621 voyage to the Gambia River.

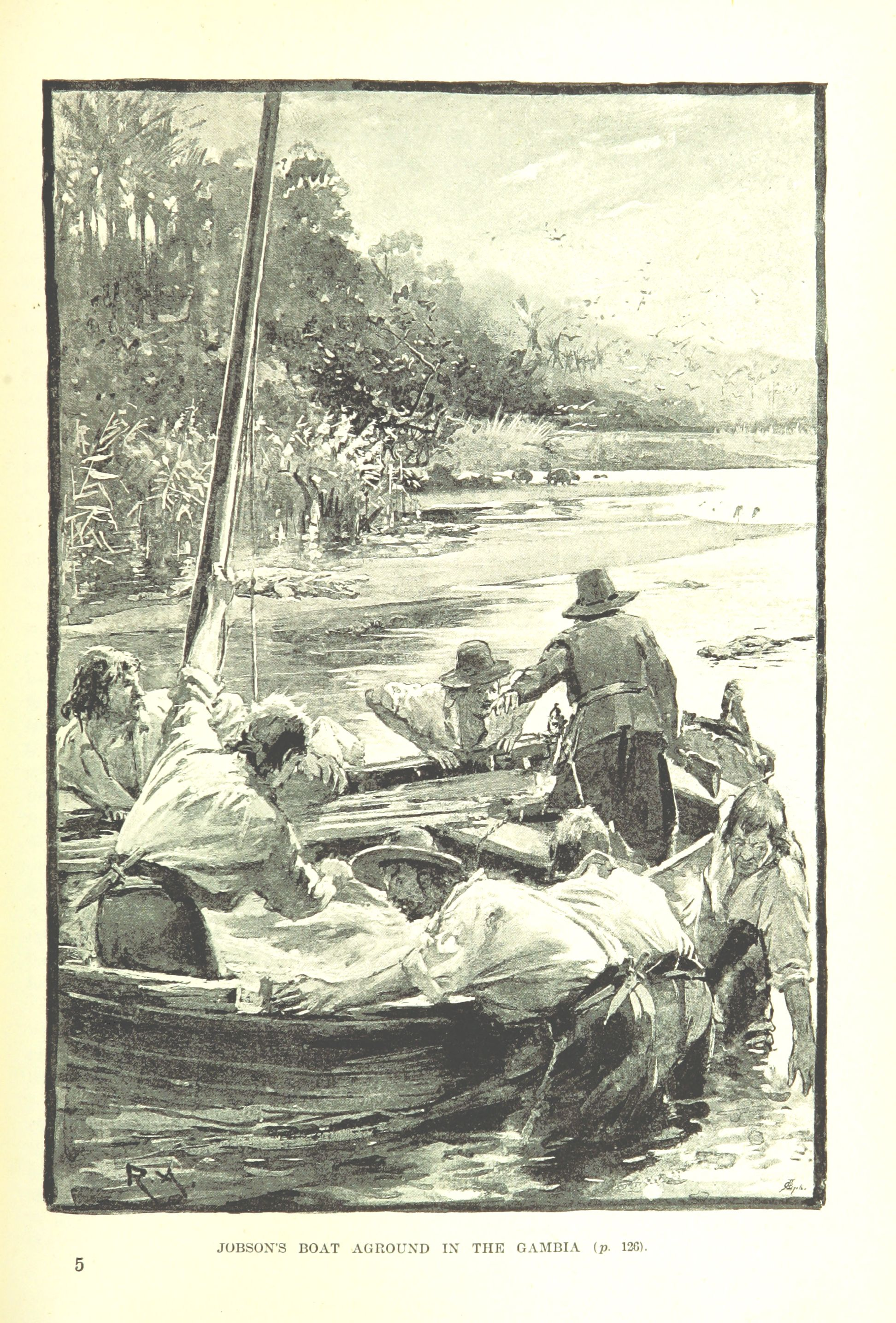
Jobson in the Gambia, 1892

== Life ==
He was appointed in 1620 to command an expedition to explore the River Gambia, for a group of adventurers. Former attempts in 1618 and 1619 had been failure, because of consequence of the hostility of the Portuguese and health problems.

Jobson, sailing from England on 25 October 1620, and arriving at the mouth of the Gambia on 17 November 1620, went up the river beyond the Barrakunda Falls, to an area he called Tenda, meaning river crossing in Mandinka. Jobson visited several places recognizable in modern places names including Wuli, Kantora, and Sutukoba. He did not find the gold he sought.

Somewhere in Gambia, Jobson refused to purchase some female slaves, stating that "We were a people, who did not deal in any such commodities, neither did wee buy or sell one another, or any that had our owne shapes;"

== Works ==
After his return to England in 1621, Jobson published The Golden Trade. He gives accounts of the Africans, then largely unknown to the English, though they had overland trade to the north coast.
