= The Abandoned Baobab =

Book by Ken Bugul

The Abandoned Baobab is a book written by Ken Bugul, the pen name of Senagelese novelist Mariètou Mbaye Biléoma. The book was originally published in French in 1982 as Le Baobab Fou and was translated in English in 1991, published by Lawrence Hill Books.

The book is written from the perspective of a Senegalese woman living in diaspora, and is largely biographical, using a blend of fiction and biography to explore the effects of post-colonialism on the lives of Senegalese women.

The review in Publishers Weekly characterised The Abandoned Baobab as "a wise, stirring, fresh and lyrical account, superbly translated," that "describes the pain and confusion of growing up in a West African country where residual French colonial influences disrupt her family life and make her feel a stranger among her own people."

The novel begins and ends with the baobab tree, which is of great symbolic importance in the novel. Of Bugul's use of the baobab tree, Shirin Edwin writes:

"The baobab tree, born from the seed planted long ago by a little boy, symbolizes nature, growth, and prosperity as it sustains life and as its protective shade nourishes this small village of Ndoucoumane. This relatively short account in "Ken's Prehistory" puts in perspective the main theme in the form of the baobab tree that does not perish in the fire and whose roots stand for tradition and custom that run deep and strong in this small African village."
