= Gassang Forest Park =

Park in the Gambia

- IUCN category IV (habitat/species management area)
- Interactive map of Gassang Forest Park
- Location: Central River Division Gambia
- Nearest city: Kuntaur
- Coordinates: 13°42′12″N 14°53′58″W
- Area: 53 ha (130 acres)
- Established: January 1, 1954

Gassang Forest Park is a forest park in the Gambia. Established on January 1, 1954, it covers 53 hectares.

The estimate terrain elevation above sea level is 2 metres.
