= Kaolack department =

Coordinates: 14.183°N 16.250°W

Kaolack
- Département
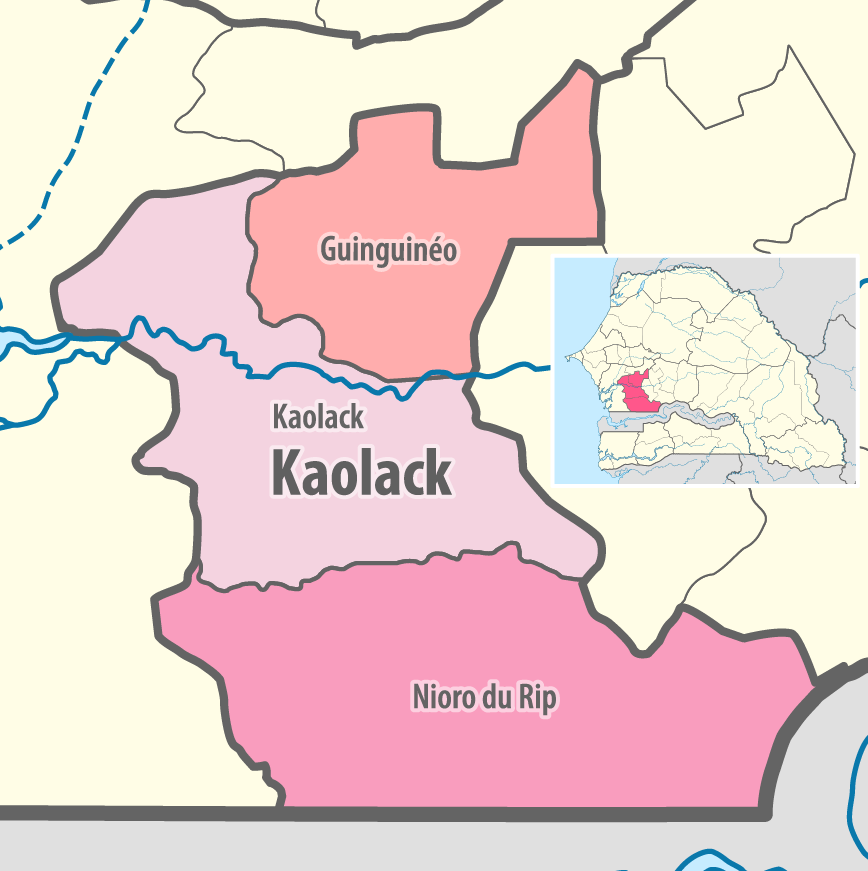
- Country: Senegal
- Region: Kaolack region
- Capital: Kaolack

Area
  - Total: 1,880 km^{2} (730 sq mi)

Population (2023 census)
  - Total: 665,008
  - Density: 354/km^{2} (916/sq mi)
- Time zone: UTC+0 (GMT)

Kaolack département is one of the 46 departments of Senegal, located in the Kaolack region.

It contains five communes: Gandiaye, Kahone, Kaolack, Ndoffane, and Sibassor.

Rural districts (communautés rurales) comprise:

- Arrondissement of Koumbal:
  - Keur Baka
  - Latmingué
  - Thiaré
- Arrondissement of Ndiédieng:
  - Keur Socé
  - Ndiaffate
  - Ndiédieng
- Arrondissement of Ngothie:
  - Dya
  - Ndiébel
  - Thiomby

== Historic sites ==
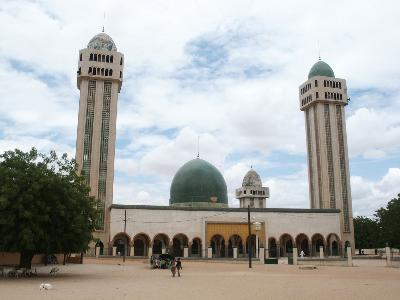
Médina Baye mosque

- Building housing the Government of Kaolack, Kaolack
- Grand Mosque of Médina Baye, Kaolack
- Ex-Palais de Justice of Kaolack
- Mosque of Diabel Ka
- Mosque Kanène, Léona
- Mosque Serigne Samba Fall, Kasnack
- Tumulus of Ndalane, Gandiaye
