= Mame Diarra Bousso =

- Born: 1833; Mbusôbé, now Podor, Senegal
- Died: 1866
- Resting place: Grand Magal of Touba
- Occupation: Sufi saint
- Children: Amadou Bamba

Mame Diarra Bousso (1833–1866) was a Sufi saint from Senegal. The annual pilgrimage to the site of her death and mausoleum is the only pilgrimage dedicated to a woman in Senegal. She was the mother of Amadou Bamba.

== Biography ==
Bousso was born to Serigne Mouhamadou Bousso and Sokhna Asta Wâlo Mbackein 1833 in Mbusôbé, a town in northeast Senegal today attached to Podor.

She died at age 33 in 1866 and was buried in Porokhane.

== Legacy and sainthood ==
Today, thousands take the annual pilgrimage to the site of her death and mausoleum in Porokhane, Senegal, the only Muslim pilgrimage dedicated to a woman in Senegal. The site also includes a mosque as well as a vocational complex for girl to receive education and training.

Bousso is also celebrated in the African diaspora among some immigrant communities. In Harlem, men and women gather to recount what they believe were her miracles, and her son Amadou Bamba, recites her poetry, and listen to musicians singing about her life.
