= Lower Saloum =

District of the Central River Division of the Gambia

Coordinates: 13°43′N 15°22′W

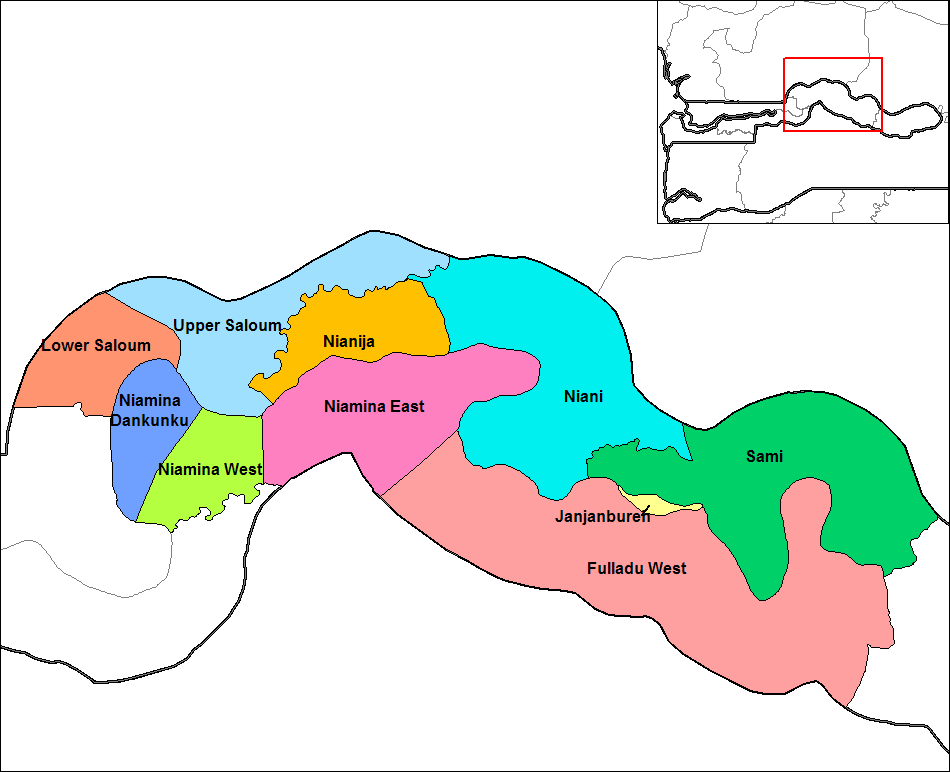
Districts of Central River Division

Lower Saloum is one of the ten districts of the Central River Division of the Gambia. Its population in the 2013 census was 15,881.
