= Mbegane Ndour =

First Maad Saloum

Mbegane Ndour (Serer: Mbegaan Nduur)

Maad Saloum & Maad a Sinig
- Reign: c. 1493 - 1513 (as Maad Saloum) c.1506 (or c. 1510 - as Maad a Sinig)
- Predecessor: Maad a Sinig Diessanou Faye (in Sine)
- Successor: Maad Saloum Giran O Ngap (in Saloum)
- Born: Diakhao, Kingdom of Sine, present-day Senegal
- House: House of Maari & of Guelowar matrilineage
- Father: Maari Nduur
- Mother: Nyillane Faye
- Religion: Serer religion

Maad Saloum Mbegane Ndour (Serer: Mbegaan Nduur or Mbeggaan Nduur), was the founder and first king of Saloum in present-day Senegal. He ruled using the Serer title Maad Saloum (king of Saloum in Serer, Bour Saloum in Wolof) from c. 1493 - 1513, and as Maad a Sinig (king of Sine) from c. 1506 or 1510 - presumably as regent. Born to a Serer father from Saloum, and a Serer princess of Sine, he belonged to the reigning Guelowar maternal dynasty of Sine and Saloum that ruled for over six-hundred years.

== Legend, family and early life ==
According to the legend of Saloum (where his father was from), Mbegane Ndour was the nephew of Maad a Sinig Maissa Wali, although this is likely a later invention to legitimate him, as the timelines do not match up. His mother was injured, and sent by the Bour Sine to the village of Mboudaye, south of the Saloum River, to heal. There, she was impregnated by the warrior Maari Nduur, commonly known as Marga Tiatj. After Ndour was born, his father came to Sine to claim his bride, although the baby was raised in Sine. Certainly, he was a part of the royal Guelowar clan.

The legend of Sine agrees pretty much with that of Saloum, except that in Sine (where his mother was from and were Serer tradition is deeply preserved), he's regarded as the maternal nephew of the King of Sine (Maad a Sinig) Diessanou Faye. In Sine, he was the son of the famous Serer hunter and healer still renowned in Sine, Saloum, and The Gambia, Maari Nduur of Mboudaye in Laghem (variation: Mary Ndour or Mari Ndour, nicknamed Marga Tiatj or Marga Tiatj) and the Serer Princess of Sine, Nyillane Faye (sister of Diessanou) of Guelowar mateilineage.

Through his mother, he trace descent to the patriarch of the Faye family, Boukar Djillakh Faye and the Guelowar Princess of Sine, Lingeer Tening Jom - who was a niece of Maissa Wali and an early maternal ancestor of the Guelowars. Maari first asked the King of Sine for his blessing to marry his younger sister after curing her wound which was difficult to cure (possibly a leg ailment according to some versions), but the King refused because of his low social status (he was a badolo - a lower class). As lingeer (who were also powerful in their own right in Serer and Wolof country), the Princess insisted and decided to go ahead with the marriage without the blessing of her brother, which resulted in a constitutional crisis in Sine. During the naming ceremony of Mbegane, his father, accompanied by his relatives, travelled from Mboudaye (what was then part of Mbey, later renamed Saloum) to Sine, and brought gifts with him. The King of Sine refused to accept the gifts, refused to host them, and refused to have the naming ceremony conducted in the palace. Instead, it was conducted in the local square without the presence of the King - who refused to attend the ceremony. Serer custom dictates that, a maternal uncle pays for almost everything during the naming ceremony of their sister's children - usually by sacrificing a bull, etc. However, since the King refused to acknowledge the child and his father (Maari), and regarded his sister's actions as disobeying his orders, he refused to front the bill for the ceremony. The tradition of Sine went on to state that, during the naming ceremony, there was a heavy rain and no bull to be sacrificed. However, Maari Nduur, using his magical powers rooted in his Serer spiritual beliefs, was able to telepathically attract an animal called 'njamla' in Serer (or elephant in other versions) for the sacrifice, and drew a circle where he ordered the guests to stay within thereby preventing them from getting wet from the heavy rainfall. Effectively, acting as a Saltigi, the Serer hereditary rain priests. Upon seeing that, some of the notables of Sine or servants of the King reported what they saw to the King, and persuaded the King to accept the marriage and child. From that marriage, they had Mbegane Ndour; his sisters Mengeh Ndour (French: Mingué NDour) who was given in marriage to the Prince of Jolof Gnoule Njie (one of the many sons of the Emperor of Jolof, Biram Njemeh Kumba Njie), and is the mother of the later King of Saloum Maad Saloum Lat Mengeh Gnilane Njie); and Khadioune Ndour. In all versions, despite the King's initial refusal to the marriage, would later accept the marriage before the impregnation and birth of Mbegane - suggesting that Mbegane was not born out of wedlock - which would have been outside the norm of Senegambian society at the time, especially in ultra-conservative Sine (where he would later rule as Maad a Sinig succeeding Diessanou Faye). The disputed claim that Mbegane's mother was first impregnated by Maari before their marriage originated from Bourgeau (1933), pp. 7-9. Bourgeau also claimed that the Guelowars invaded the Serers of Sine and conquered them, an account which has now been debunked and refuted. The Serer-Guelowar relationship was through a marriage alliance. For more on that, see Guelowar (and the Serer maternal clans article where alliances between matriclans form an important feature).

Mbegane is the ancestor of King of Saloum Fode N'Gouye Joof via his mother N'Gouye Ndour of Selik.

== Early career ==
His early career is subject of numerous, sometimes contradictory, oral traditions. Most likely he participated in wars in both Cayor and Baol, won a reputation as a brilliant general, and may have ruled as Teigne of Baol for a period. He allied himself with the Buurba Jolof Biram Njeme Kumba, and the support of the Ndiaye dynasty would be important in the founding of Saloum. A potential rival for power, Mbegane was not particularly welcome at the royal court of Sine, and so was sent to his paternal homeland to carve out a kingdom for himself.

== Kingship ==
Serer royal and religious titles
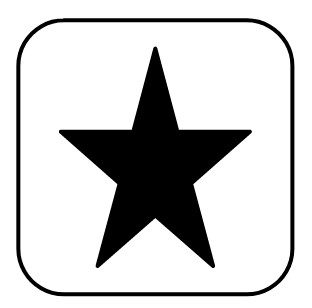
- Royal titles
- Lamane (also religious)
- Maad
- Maad a Sinig
- Maad Saloum
- Teigne
- Lingeer
- Line of succession
- Buumi
- Thilas
- Loul Religious titles
- Saltigue

The chiefdom called Mbey was under the influence of a Toucouleur marabout named Elibana. Ndour asked for permission to settle in the village of Coofak, near modern-day Kaolack, and was refused. The marabout's attempts to convert the local Serer to Islam had created friction, and so they joined Mbegane's forces, also strengthened by the purchase of horses and guns from European merchants on the coast. In the legend, after proving unable to overcome him on the battlefield, Ndour transformed into a snake and hid outside Elibana's mosque; when the marabout emerged from his prayers, the snake bit him, and he died. He then fought and defeated Diattara Tambedou, who was either Elibana's successor or a former ally of Ndour's. Tambedou, a Muslim Soninke, was likely a salt merchant. Control over this vital resource underpinned the conflict as much or more than religious differences.

Ndour renamed Njop Kahone and made it the capital of a kingdom modeled on his homeland, Sine. He built up his power by allying with the various smaller powers of the region, including Serer Lamanes, Soninke or Toucouleur marabouts, and local village chiefs, but he only directly controlled Mbey.

About 10 years after taking the throne, he may have served as regent in Sine to the underage Maad a Sinig. Legend that he founded the village of Ngaye Mekhe in Baol, where he died, after 20 years of rule.

In Saloum, he resided in Selik, the village of his male descendants.

Preceded by none	Maad Saloum c. 1493–1513	Succeeded by Giran O Ngap
