= Kaolack region =

Region of Senegal

Kaolack region Région de Kaolack (French) Diiwaanu Kawlax (Wolof)
- Region
- Location of Kaolack in Senegal

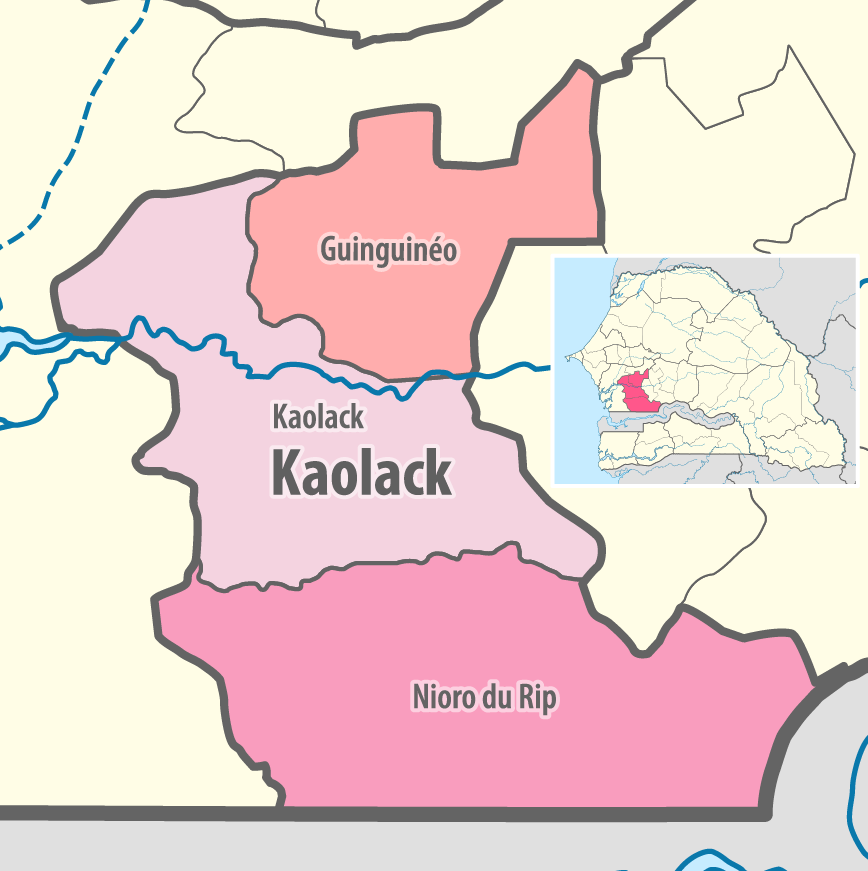
- Kaolack région, divided into 3 départements
- Coordinates: 14°09′N 14°30′W
- Country: Senegal
- Capital: Kaolack
- Départements: List: Guinguinéo; Kaolack; Nioro du Rip

Area
  - Total: 5,357 km^{2} (2,068 sq mi)

Population (2023 census)
  - Total: 1,338,671
  - Density: 249.9/km^{2} (647.2/sq mi)
- Time zone: UTC+0 (GMT)
- HDI (2017): 0.444 low · 6th

The Kaolack region is a region in Senegal. It borders Gambia and is a common stopping point for travel between Dakar and Banjul. Its borders correspond roughly to the Saalum Kingdom of precolonial days, and the area is still spoken of as the Saalum in Wolof, and its inhabitants are called Saalum-Saalum.

Kaolack city is the administrative centre for the region. It is a port on the Saloum River. Lying in a farm area, Kaolack is a major peanut marketing and exporting center and has a large peanut oil factory. Brewing, leather tanning, cotton ginning, and fish processing are also important industries. Salt is produced from salines near the Saloum River. The city is on the railroad from Dakar to the Niger River in Mali. Kaolack is the international centre of the Ibrahimiyyah branch of the Tijaniyyah Sufi order, whose mosque is on the city's outskirts.

== Departments ==
The Kaolack Region is subdivided into three departments:

- Guinguinéo département
- Kaolack département
- Nioro du Rip département
